= List of songs recorded by Fugazi =

Below is a list of songs that have been recorded by the Washington, DC-based post-hardcore band Fugazi.

== List ==
Title	Release	Release Year	Length	Lead vocalist	# of times played live (Note: This is an incomplete list - there are still many unrecorded Fugazi sets, so this is just how many have been recorded.)	Notes
"23 Beats Off"	In on the Kill Taker	1993	6:41	Ian MacKaye	27	
"23 Beats Off (Albini Session)	Albini Sessions	2026	3:52	Ian MacKaye	27	Previously unreleased demo.
"Afterthought"	Instrument Soundtrack	1999	1:28			Track from the film Instrument.
"And the Same"	Margin Walker	1989	3:27	MacKaye	387	Later released on the compilation album 13 Songs.
"And the Same (Demo)"	First Demo	2014	5:08	MacKaye	387	
"Argument"	The Argument	2001	4:27	MacKaye	73	Jerry Busher plays percussion on this track.
"Arpeggiator"	End Hits	1998	4:28		160	
"Arpeggiator (Demo)"	Instrument Soundtrack	1999	2:54		160	Track from the film Instrument.
"Back to Base"	Red Medicine	1995	1:45	MacKaye	139	
"Bad Mouth"	Fugazi	1988	2:35	MacKaye	300	Later released on the compilation album 13 Songs.
"Bad Mouth (Demo)"	First Demo	2014	2:54	MacKaye	300	
"Bed for the Scraping"	Red Medicine	1995	2:50	MacKaye	310	
"Birthday Pony"	Red Medicine	1995	3:08	MacKaye	202	
"Blueprint"	Repeater	1990	3:52	Guy Picciotto	594	Later released on the compilation album Repeater + 3 Songs.
"Break"	End Hits	1998	2:12	MacKaye	181	
"Break-In"	3 Songs	1989	1:32	Picciotto	146	Later released on the compilation album Repeater + 3 Songs.
"Break-In (Demo)"	First Demo	2014	1:36	Picciotto	146	
"Brendan #1"	Repeater	1990	2:32		163	Later released on the compilation album Repeater + 3 Songs.
"Bulldog Front"	Fugazi	1988	2:53	Picciotto	241	Later released on the compilation album 13 Songs.
"Burning"	Fugazi	1988	2:39	Picciotto	240	Later released on the compilation album 13 Songs.
"Burning Too"	Margin Walker	1989	2:50	MacKaye	227	Later released on the compilation album 13 Songs.
"By You"	Red Medicine	1995		Joe Lally	233	
"Cashout"	The Argument	2001	4:24	MacKaye	68	Jerry Busher plays percussion, and Amy Domingues plays cello on this track.
"Cassavettes"	In on the Kill Taker	1993	2:30	Picciotto	175	
"Cassavettes (Albini Sessions)"	Albini Sessions	2026	2:33	Picciotto	175	Previously unreleased demo.
"Caustic Acrostic"	End Hits	1998	2:01	Picciotto	51	
"Closed Captioned"	End Hits	1998	4:52	MacKaye	167	
"Closed Captioned (Demo)"	Instrument Soundtrack	1999	5:50		167	Track from the film Instrument.
"Combination Lock"	Red Medicine	1995	3:06		21	
"Dear Justice Letter"	Steady Diet of Nothing	1991	3:27	Picciotto	150	
"Downed City"	Red Medicine	1995	2:53	Picciotto	114	
"Do You Like Me"	Red Medicine	1995	3:16	Picciotto	282	
"Epic Problem"	The Argument	2001	3:59	MacKaye	36	Jerry Busher plays second drums on this track.
"Exit Only"	Steady Diet of Nothing	1991	3:11	Picciotto	277	
"Ex-Spectator"	The Argument	2001	4:18	MacKaye	50	Jerry Busher plays second drums on this track.
"F/D"	End Hits	1998	3:42	MacKaye, Picciotto	120	
"Facet Squared"	In on the Kill Taker	1993	2:42	MacKaye	303	
"Facet Squared (Albini Session)"	Albini Sessions	2026	2:40	MacKaye	303	Previously unreleased demo.
"Fell, Destroyed"	Red Medicine	1995	3:45	Picciotto	136	
"Five Corporations"	End Hits	1998	2:29	MacKaye	110	
"Floating Boy"	End Hits	1998	5:45	Picciotto	106	
"Floating Boy (Demo)"	Instrument Soundtrack	1999	3:35		106	Track from the film Instrument.
"Foreman's Dog"	End Hits	1998	4:21	MacKaye, Picciotto	36	
"Forensic Scene"	Red Medicine	1995	3:05	Picciotto	201	
"Full Disclosure"	The Argument	2001	3:53	Picciotto	31	Bridget Cross and Kathi Wilcox sing backing vocals on this track.
"Furniture"	Furniture	2001	3:35	MacKaye	105	
"Furniture (Demo)"	First Demo	2014	4:07	MacKaye	105	
"Give Me the Cure"	Fugazi	1988	2:58	Picciotto	392	Later released on the compilation album 13 Songs.
"Glue Man"	Fugazi	1988	4:23	Picciotto	148	Later released on the compilation album 13 Songs.
"Great Cop"	In on the Kill Taker	1993	1:52	MacKaye	273	
"Great Cop (Albini Sessions)"	Albini Sessions	2026	1:50	MacKaye	273	Previously unreleased demo.
"Greed"	Repeater	1990	1:47	MacKaye, Picciotto	192	Later released on the compilation album Repeater + 3 Songs.
"Guilford Fall"	End Hits	1998	2:57	Picciotto	32	
"Guilford Fall (Demo)"	Instrument Soundtrack	1999	3:29		32	Track from the film Instrument.
"H.B."	Instrument Soundtrack	1999	1:19			Track from the film Instrument.
"Heart on My Chest"	Fugazi Live Series: FLS0065	1988			1	Only played once live on October 31 of 1988
"Hello Morning"	Furniture	2001	2:06	Picciotto	4	
"I'm So Tired"	Instrument Soundtrack	1999	1:59	MacKaye		Track from the film Instrument.
"In Defense of Humans"	State of the Union	1989	2:40	MacKaye	31	
"In Defense of Humans (Demo)"	First Demo	2014	2:47	MacKaye	31	
"Instrument"	In on the Kill Taker	1993	3:43	MacKaye	277	
"Instrument (Albini Session)"	Albini Sessions	2026	3:23	MacKaye	277	Previously unreleased demo.
"Intro"	The Argument	2001	0:52			
"Joe #1"	3 Songs	1989	3:01		132	Later released on the compilation album Repeater + 3 Songs.
"Joe #1 (Demo)"	First Demo	2014	1:41		132	
"The Kill"	The Argument	2001	5:27	Lally	37	Chad Clark plays piano and Jerry Busher plays percussion on this track.
"KYEO"	Steady Diet of Nothing	1991	2:58	MacKaye	182	
"Last Chance for a Slow Dance"	In on the Kill Taker	1993	4:38	Picciotto	138	
"Last Chance for a Slow Dance (Albini Session)"	Albini Sessions	2026	4:19	Picciotto	138	Previously unreleased demo.
"Latest Disgrace"	Red Medicine	1995	3:34	Picciotto	39	
"Latin Roots"	Steady Diet of Nothing	1991	3:13	Picciotto	187	
"Life and Limb"	The Argument	2001	3:09	Picciotto	24	Bridget Cross sings backing vocals on this track.
"Link Track"	Instrument Soundtrack	1999	1:26		3	Track from the film Instrument.
"Little Debbie"	Instrument Soundtrack	1999	1:49	MacKaye		Track from the film Instrument.
"Lockdown"	Margin Walker	1989	2:10	Picciotto	175	Later released on the compilation album 13 Songs.
"Lock Dug"	Fugazi Live Series: FLS0010	1987			1	Jam played on December 5, 1987.
"Long Distance Runner"	Red Medicine	1995	4:17	MacKaye	114	
"Long Division"	Steady Diet of Nothing	1991	2:12	MacKaye	508	
"Lusty Scripps"	Instrument Soundtrack	1999	3:42		1	Track from the film Instrument.
"Margin Walker"	Margin Walker	1989			451	Later released on the compilation album 13 Songs.
"Me and Thumbelina"	Instrument Soundtrack	1999	0:45	MacKaye		Track from the film Instrument.
"Merchandise"	Repeater	1990	2:59	MacKaye	491	Later released on the compilation album Repeater + 3 Songs.
"Merchandise (Demo)"	First Demo	2014	3:07	MacKaye	491	
"Nedcars"	Fugazi Live Series: FLS0446	1992			1	Song only ever played once on May 21 of 1992.
"Nice New Outfit"	Steady Diet of Nothing	1991	3:26	Picciotto	117	
"Nightshop"	The Argument	2001	4:02	Picciotto	46	Jerry Busher plays percussion on this track.
"Noisy Dub"	Fugazi Live Series: FLS1007	2001			1	Instrumental jam only ever played live once on July 1, 2001.
"No Surprise"	End Hits	1998	4:12	MacKaye, Picciotto	94	
"N.S.A."	Fugazi Live Series: FLS0103	1989			1	Only ever played once on May 1, 1989.
"Number Five"	Furniture	2001	3:09		118	Jerry Busher plays drums on this track instead of Canty.
"Oh"	The Argument	2001	4:29	Picciotto	88	Jerry Busher plays second drums on this track.
"Pink Frosty"	End Hits	1998	4:09	MacKaye	68	
"Pink Frosty (Demo)"	Instrument Soundtrack	1999	3:47		68	Track from the film Instrument.
"Place Position"	End Hits	1998	2:45	Picciotto	138	
"Polish"	Steady Diet of Nothing	1991	3:38	MacKaye	5	
"Preprovisional"	Fugazi Live Series: FLS0065-86	1988		Picciotto		Early live version of Provisional.
"Promises"	Margin Walker	1989	4:02	MacKaye	387	Later released on the compilation album 13 Songs.
"Provisional"	Margin Walker	1989	2:17	Picciotto	18	Later released on the compilation album 13 Songs.
"Public Witness Program"	In on the Kill Taker	1993	2:04	Picciotto	271	
"Public Witness Program (Albini Session)"	Albini Sessions	2026	3:13	Picciotto	271	Previously unreleased demo.
"Recap Modotti"	End Hits	1998	3:50	Lally	149	
"Reclamation"	Steady Diet of Nothing	1991	3:21	MacKaye	606	
"Rend It"	In on the Kill Taker	1993	3:48	Picciotto	353	
"Rend It (Albini Session)"	Albini Sessions	2026	3:50	Picciotto	353	Previously unreleased demo.
"Rend It (Demo)"	Instrument Soundtrack	1999	3:32	Picciotto	353	Track from the film Instrument.
"Repeater"	Repeater	1990	3:01	MacKaye	416	Later released on the compilation album Repeater + 3 Songs.
"Reprovisional"	Repeater	1990	2:18	Picciotto	279	Later released on the compilation album Repeater + 3 Songs. Re-recording of "Provisional" off of Margin Walker.
"Returning the Screw"	In on the Kill Taker	1993	3:13	MacKaye	135	
"Returning the Screw (Albini Session)"	Albini Sessions	2026	3:14	MacKaye	135	Previously unreleased demo.
"Runaway Return"	Steady Diet of Nothing	1991	3:58	Picciotto	266	
"Set the Charges"	Fugazi Live Series: FLS0368	1991			1	Only ever played live once on July 28, 1991.
"Shaken All Over"	Instrument Soundtrack	1999	0:58			Track from the film Instrument.
"She Is Blind"	Fugazi Live Series: FLS0216	1990			1	Only ever played live once on May 25, 1990.
"Shut the Door"	Repeater	1990	4:49	MacKaye	330	Later released on the compilation album Repeater + 3 Songs.
"Sieve-Fisted Find"	Repeater	1990	3:24	Picciotto	422	Later released on the compilation album Repeater + 3 Songs.
"Slo Crostic"	Instrument Soundtrack	1999	2:41			Track from the film Instrument. Early version of Caustic Acrostic.
"Smallpox Champion"	In on the Kill Taker	1993	4:01	Picciotto	260	
"Smallpox Champion (Albini Session)"	Albini Sessions	2026	3:44	Picciotto	260	Previously unreleased demo.
"Song #1"	3 Songs	1989	2:54	MacKaye	338	Later released on the compilation album Repeater + 3 Songs.
"Song #1 (Demo)"	First Demo	2014	3:00	MacKaye	338	
"Stacks"	Steady Diet of Nothing	1991	3:08	MacKaye	156	
"Steady Diet"	Steady Diet of Nothing	1991	3:42		46	
"Strangelight"	The Argument	2001	5:53	Picciotto	19	Chad Clark plays piano, Jerry Busher plays percussion, and Amy Domingues plays cello on this track.
"Styrofoam"	Repeater	1990	2:34	MacKaye	293	Later released on the compilation album Repeater + 3 Songs.
"Suggestion"	Fugazi	1988	4:44	MacKaye	372	Later released on the compilation album 13 Songs.
"Surf Tune 1"	Fugazi Live Series: FLS0484	1992		7' tall drunk Dane with a giant mohawk	1	Improvised surf tune only played live once on July 4, 1992.
"Surf Tune 2"	Fugazi Live Series: FLS0484	1992		7' tall drunk Dane with a giant mohawk	1	Improvised surf tune only played live once on July 4, 1992.
"Surf Tune 3"	Fugazi Live Series: FLS0598	1993			1	Improvised surf tune played once live on September 29, 1993.
"Sweet and Low"	In on the Kill Taker	1993	3:36		251	
"Sweet and Low (Albini Session)"	Albini Sessions	2026	3:20		251	Previously unreleased demo.
"Swingset"	Instrument Soundtrack	1999	1:37			Track from the film Instrument.
"Target"	Red Medicine	1995	3:32	Picciotto	266	
"Trio's"	Instrument Soundtrack	1999	2:15			Track from the film Instrument.
"Turkish Disco"	Instrument Soundtrack	1999	2:34			Track from the film Instrument.
"Turn Off Your Guns (Demo)"	First Demo	2014	3:43	MacKaye	17	Previously unreleased song.
"Turnover"	Repeater	1990	4:16	Picciotto	409	Later released on the compilation album Repeater + 3 Songs.
"Two Beats Off"	Repeater	1990	3:28	Picciotto	382	Later released on the compilation album Repeater + 3 Songs.
"Version"	Red Medicine	1995	3:20		35	
"Waiting Room"	Fugazi	1988	2:53	MacKaye	660	Later released on the compilation album 13 Songs.
"Waiting Room (Demo)"	First Demo	2014	3:10	MacKaye	660	
"Walken's Syndrome"	In on the Kill Taker	1993	3:18	Picciotto	144	
"Walken's Syndrome (Albini Session)"	Albini Sessions	2026	2:54	Picciotto	144	Previously unreleased demo.
"The Word"	20 Years of Dischord	2002	4:19	MacKaye	36	Previously unreleased track.
"The Word (Demo)"	First Demo	2014	4:38	MacKaye	36	
"World Beat"	Fugazi Live Series: FLS0764 and 0765	1996			2	Song only played twice on January 30th and 31st of 1996.

== Personnel ==
=== Main band ===
- Ian MacKaye – guitar, lead/backing vocals
- Guy Picciotto – guitar (starting in 1989), lead/backing vocals
- Joe Lally – bass
- Brendan Canty – drums

=== Misc. performers ===
- Jerry Busher – second drums, percussion
- Amy Domingues – cello
- Bridget Cross, Kathi Wilcox – backing vocals
- Chad Clark – piano

== See also ==
- Fugazi discography
