= Fugazi discography =

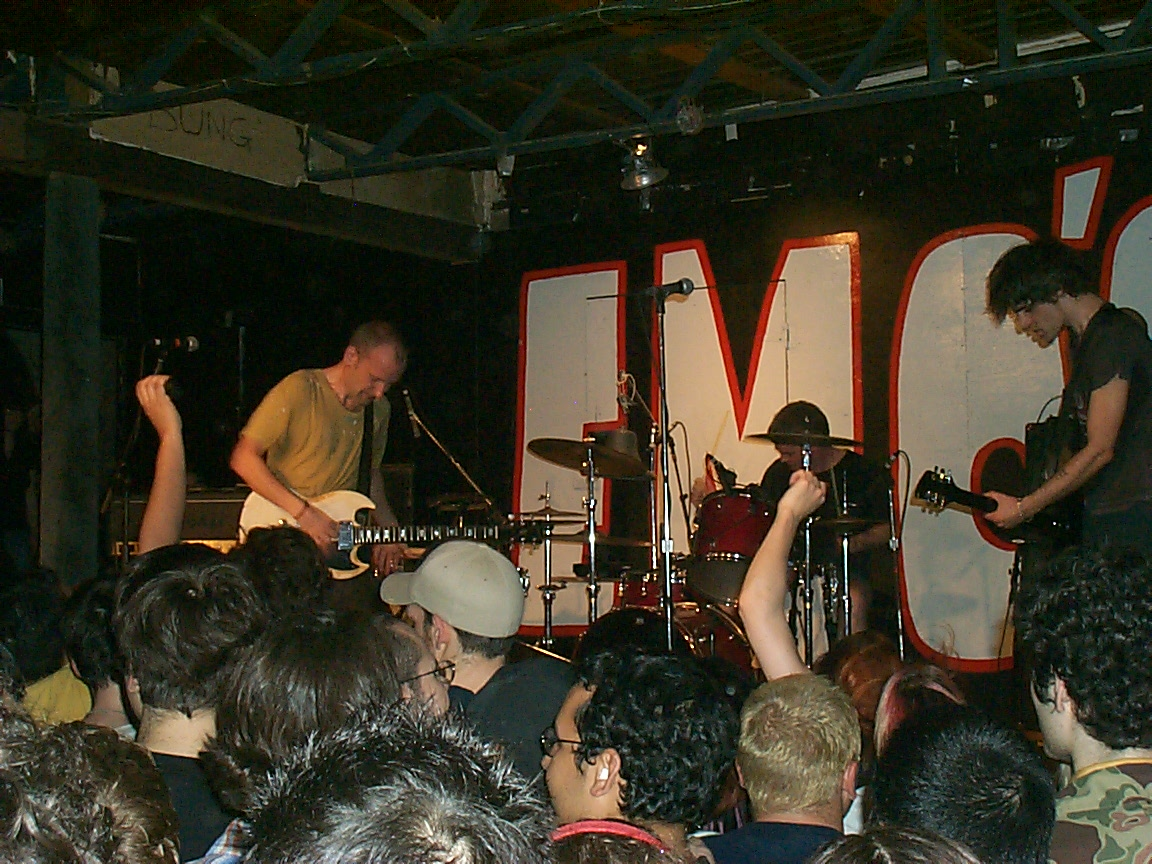
- Fugazi in 2002
- Studio albums: 6
- Extended plays: 4
- Soundtrack albums: 1
- Live albums: 896
- Compilation albums: 2
- Demos: 2
- Other appearances: 4

The discography of Fugazi, an American post-hardcore band, consists of six studio albums, four EPs, a compilation album, a soundtrack album, two demo albums and a series of hundreds of live recordings. All of the band's releases have been published by Dischord Records, the independent record label co-owned and operated by Fugazi singer and guitarist Ian MacKaye.

Fugazi formed in Washington, D.C., in 1986 with a lineup of MacKaye, bassist Joe Lally, and drummer Brendan Canty. Guy Picciotto soon joined as a second singer, and the band released an eponymously titled EP in 1988. By the following year's Margin Walker EP, Picciotto was also playing guitar. The two EPs were compiled together as 13 Songs (1989). A third EP, 3 Songs, was released in a collectors edition by Sub Pop Records in 1989 and more widely with different artwork by Dischord in 1990. Later that year came Fugazi's first full-length studio album, Repeater, which was coupled with the 3 Songs EP for its CD release. 1991's Steady Diet of Nothing was their first album to chart, reaching no. 63 on the UK Albums Chart. In on the Kill Taker (1993) was their first album to chart on the Billboard 200, reaching no. 153.

1995's Red Medicine became the highest-charting album of Fugazi's career, reaching no. 126 in the United States and no. 18 in the United Kingdom. End Hits followed in 1998. In conjunction with Instrument, director Jem Cohen's 1999 documentary film about the band, Fugazi released the Instrument Soundtrack, consisting of instrumental music and previously unreleased studio outtakes and demos. The band's sixth studio album, The Argument, was released in 2001 along with the Furniture EP.

Fugazi has been on an indefinite hiatus since 2002. Between 2002 and 2008, Dischord remastered and re-released 13 Songs, Repeater, Steady Diet of Nothing, In on the Kill Taker, Red Medicine, and End Hits. The Fugazi Live Series, an ongoing effort by Dischord to release recordings of over 800 Fugazi concerts, began in 2004. Initially releasing the shows on CD, the series switched to a digital distribution system in 2011.

On November 18, 2014, Dischord released First Demo, 11 tracks the band recorded in January 1988.

== Studio albums ==
Title	Album details	Peak chart positions			Sales
Title	Album details	US	US Heat.	UK	Sales
Repeater	Released: April 19, 1990; Label: Dischord (044); Formats: LP, CD, cassette	—	—	—	US: 500,000
Steady Diet of Nothing	Released: July 1, 1991; Label: Dischord (060); Formats: LP, CD, cassette	—	—	63	US: 215,000
In on the Kill Taker	Released: June 30, 1993; Label: Dischord (070); Formats: LP, CD, cassette	153	4	24	US: 180,000
Red Medicine	Released: June 12, 1995; Label: Dischord (090); Formats: LP, CD, cassette	126	2	18	
End Hits	Released: April 28, 1998; Label: Dischord (110); Formats: LP, CD	138	4	47	US: 81,000
The Argument	Released: October 16, 2001; Label: Dischord (130); Formats: LP, CD	151	1	63	US: 57,000

== Live albums ==
The Fugazi Live Series is an ongoing project by Dischord Records to release recordings of over 800 Fugazi concerts performed between 1987 and 2003. From early in their career, Fugazi had their sound engineers record most of their live performances. In 2004 Dischord released 20 of these recordings on compact disc, burning them to CD-Rs on a per-order basis. 10 more recordings were released in the same manner the following year. In December 2011 Dischord began releasing the entire archive of recordings as music downloads, using a "pay what you want" pricing system.

== Compilation albums ==
Title	Album details	Sales
13 Songs	Released: September, 1989; Label: Dischord (036); Formats: LP, CD	US: 750,000
Repeater + 3 Songs	Released: March 1, 1990; Label: Dischord (045); Formats: CD	—

== Soundtracks ==
Title	Album details	Peak chart positions
Title	Album details	US Heat.
Instrument Soundtrack	Released: March 23, 1999; Label: Dischord (120); Formats: LP, CD	43

== Demos ==
Title	Album details	Peak chart positions	
Title	Album details	US	US Heat.
First Demo	Released: November 18, 2014; Label: Dischord (181); Formats: LP, CD	—	8
Albini Sessions (Benefit for Letters Charity)	Released: March 6, 2026; Label: Dischord; Formats: Digital	197	*

== EPs ==
Title	Album details	Peak chart positions	
Title	Album details	CAN	UK
Fugazi	Released: 1988; Label: Dischord (030); Formats: 12-inch EP, cassette	—	—
Margin Walker	Released: June 1989; Label: Dischord (035); Formats: 12-inch EP, cassette	—	—
3 Songs	Released: 1989, 1990; Labels: Sub Pop (052), Dischord (043); Formats: 7-inch EP	—	—
Furniture	Released: October 8, 2001; Label: Dischord (129); Formats: 7-inch EP, CD	18	61

== Other appearances ==
The following Fugazi songs were released on compilation albums. This is not an exhaustive list; songs that were first released on the band's albums and EPs are not included.

Title	Album details	Track(s)
State of the Union	Released: April 1989; Label: Dischord (032); Format: LP, CD	"In Defense of Humans"
International Pop Underground Convention	Released: August 1991; Label: K (KLP011); Format: LP, CD	"Reprovisional" (live)
20 Years of Dischord	Released: September 23, 2002; Label: Dischord (125); Format: CD	"The Word"; "Burning" (live)
Short. Fast. Loud.	Released: September 11, 2006; Label: ABC; Format: CD	"KYEO" (live)

== See also ==
- List of songs recorded by Fugazi
- Fugazi track listing
