= FLS0001 =

Live album by Fugazi
- Released: September 3, 1987
- Recorded: September 3, 1987
- Venue: Wilson Center
- Genres: post-hardcore, punk rock
- Length: 32:41
- Language: English
- Labels: Dischord, Fugazi Live Series
- Producer: Fugazi
- Compiler: Fugazi

Fugazi Live Series chronology
FLS0001 (1987)	FLS0002 (1987)

FLS0001 refers to the catalog number of the first entry in the Fugazi Live Series. This show was played at the Wilson Center in Washington, D.C. on September 3, 1987, at 7:30 PM, and was the first show played by the post-hardcore band Fugazi. The door price was 5 USD, and about 300 attendees showed up. Fugazi played with local bands Marginal Man, Ignition, and Fire Party. This show was recorded by Joey Picuri, was mastered by the band, and according to the Fugazi Live Series website, has a quality rating of "good." This show was played as a three-piece (Canty, Lally, MacKaye) and was a benefit for the State of the Union compilation album. Fugazi was introduced by a Positive Force activist Mark Anderson. Fugazi also had handouts of a lyric sheet for their setlist available, listing the lyrics for some of the songs they played that night.

== Track listing ==
All tracks are written by Fugazi.

FLS0001 track listing
No.	Title	Length
1.	"Joe #1" (Live)	01:23
2.	"Interlude 1"	00:54
3.	"Song #1" (Live)	02:51
4.	"Furniture" (Live)	05:34
5.	"Interlude 2"	01:02
6.	"Merchandise" (Live)	03:12
7.	"Interlude 3"	00:28
8.	"Turn Off Your Guns" (Live)	04:02
9.	"Interlude 4"	00:44
10.	"In Defense of Humans" (Live)	02:50
11.	"Interlude 5"	00:31
12.	"Waiting Room" (Live)	03:10
13.	"Interlude 6"	00:45
14.	"The Word" (Live)	04:53
15.	"Outro"	00:22
Total length:		32:41

== See also ==
- Fugazi discography
- Fugazi Live Series
- List of songs recorded by Fugazi
