= First Demo =

2014 demo album by Fugazi

Demo album by Fugazi
- Released: November 18, 2014
- Recorded: January 1988
- Studios: Inner Ear Studios, Dischord House, Arlington, Virginia
- Genre: Post-hardcore
- Length: 35:41
- Label: Dischord
- Producers: Fugazi, Don Zientara

Fugazi chronology
Fugazi Live Series (2004–present)	First Demo (2014)	Albini Sessions (2026)

Professional ratings
Aggregate scores
Source	Rating
Metacritic	79/100
Review scores
Source	Rating
The 405	8/10
AllMusic	4/5 stars
Clash	8/10
Consequence of Sound	B+
Exclaim!	7/10
The Line of Best Fit	7.5/10
MusicOMH	4/5 stars
NME	7/10
OndaRock	6.5/10
Pitchfork	7.6/10

First Demo is a demo album from the post-hardcore band Fugazi released on November 18, 2014, through Dischord Records. It was recorded at Don Zientara's Inner Ear Studios in Arlington, VA and the Dischord House in 1988. It was the band's first studio release in over thirteen years since the release of The Argument in October 2001. First Demo was released on LP, CD and as a digital download.

== Writing and recording ==
First Demo was recorded in January 1988 with the band having only performed 10 shows together. The album features the 10 tracks from the original demo tape, including "In Defense of Humans", which was released on 1989's State of the Union compilation, "The Word", originally released on 20 Years of Dischord, as well as an additional track from the session, "Turn Off Your Guns", a song previously never released in its studio form and only available through the Fugazi Live Series.

Some songs recorded during these sessions would later be re-recorded and put out on later releases; all but "Furniture", "The Word", "In Defense of Humans", and "Turn Off Your Guns" would be released on future albums within the following five years. Tracks 1, 6, and 9 would be released on the band's first EP and later 13 Songs, "Merchandise" would be released on Repeater, "Break-In", "Song #1", and "Joe #1" on 3 Songs (later released with Repeater as Repeater + 3 Songs). "Furniture" would take the longest to be released, released on the Furniture EP in 2001.

== Track listing ==
All tracks are written by Fugazi.

No.	Title	Lead vocals	Length
1.	"Waiting Room" (Demo)	MacKaye	3:10
2.	"Merchandise" (Demo)	MacKaye	3:07
3.	"Furniture" (Demo)	MacKaye	4:07
4.	"Song #1" (Demo)	MacKaye	3:00
5.	"The Word" (Demo)	MacKaye	4:38
6.	"Bad Mouth" (Demo)	MacKaye	2:54
7.	"Break-In" (Demo)	Picciotto	1:36
8.	"Turn Off Your Guns" (Demo)	MacKaye	3:43
9.	"And the Same" (Demo)	MacKaye	5:08
10.	"In Defense of Humans" (Demo)	MacKaye	2:47
11.	"Joe #1" (Demo)		1:41
Total length:			35:41

== Personnel ==
- Ian MacKaye – vocals, guitar
- Guy Picciotto – backing vocals, vocals (track 7)
- Joe Lally – bass
- Brendan Canty – drums

Production

- Fugazi – producer, recording, engineer, mixing
- Don Zientara – producer, recording, engineer, mixing
