= Rain (American band) =

American rock band

- Origin: Washington, D.C., US
- Genres: Emo; post-hardcore; punk rock
- Years active: 1986–1990
- Labels: Dischord; Peterbilt
- Members: Eli Janney; Jon Kirschten; Scott McCloud; Bert Queiroz
- Website: dischord.com/band/rain

Rain was an American band, considered a key part of the second wave of Washington, D.C.'s Revolution Summer movement, which is regarded as the original wave of emotional hardcore punk. They followed acts like Embrace and Rites of Spring.

The band was notable for comprising members of other influential hardcore/punk acts; Bert Queiroz spent time in Youth Brigade and Jon Kirschten had a stint with Gray Matter prior to forming Rain, while Eli Janney later formed noted post-hardcore act Girls Against Boys with Scott McCloud after Rain's dissolution.

The band formed as a three-piece in 1986. After playing several shows, the band recorded twice in 1987. The first session resulted in the band's demo tape, which surfaced shortly thereafter. For the second session, second guitarist Scott McCloud joined the band. "Worlds at War," from this second session, appeared on Dischord's 1989 compilation State of the Union. However, the full session was not released until 1990, when Guy Picciotto (Fugazi, Rites of Spring) put it out as a 12" EP on his Peterbilt label with the title La Vache Qui Rit. They broke up shortly thereafter.

La Vache Qui Rit was remastered and reissued on compact disc by Dischord/Peterbilt in late 2007.

== Final lineup ==
- Eli Janney – drums
- Jon Kirschten – guitar, vocals
- Bert Queiroz – bass
- Scott McCloud – guitar, vocals

== Discography ==
=== EPs ===
- Demo Tape (1987) self-released
- La Vache Qui Rit (1990; LP/2007; CD) Dischord Records/Peterbilt

=== Compilation appearances ===
- State of the Union (1989) Dischord Records - "Worlds at War"
