= Instrument (film) =

- Directed by: Jem Cohen
- Starring: Fugazi (Brendan Canty, Joe Lally, Ian MacKaye, Guy Picciotto)
- Release dates: March 29, 1999 (VHS); November 13, 2001 (DVD)
- Running time: 115 minutes
- Country: United States
- Language: English

Instrument is a documentary film directed by Jem Cohen about the band Fugazi. The film takes its title from the Fugazi song of the same name, from their 1993 album, In on the Kill Taker.

== Content ==
Instrument was shot from 1987 through 1998 on super 8, 16mm and video and is composed mainly of footage of concerts, interviews with the band members, practices, tours and time spent in the studio recording their 1995 album, Red Medicine. The film also includes portraits of fans as well as interviews with them at various Fugazi shows around the United States throughout the years.

Notable scenes in the film include Fugazi performing for inmates at Lorton Correctional Facility; singer/guitarist Guy Picciotto's performance in a Philadelphia college gym in 1988, where he stuffs himself through a basketball hoop and performs hanging upside down by his legs (filmed by Todd Crespi); and an interview of Guy Picciotto and Ian MacKaye by an 8th grade girl for a Public-access television cable TV show.

== Background ==
Cohen's relationship with band member Ian MacKaye extends back to the 1970s when the two met in high school in Washington, D.C. When asked what the goal was in making Instrument, Cohen responded:

I did feel that there were a lot of people that either didn't have access to the band or had something of a misconception of what they were like. I wanted to address those issues to some degree, but what I really wanted to do was just capture music-making and try to make something that felt, visually, like music, and something where the music was inextricably tied in with the moving pictures.

One such misconception is shared in a scene where drummer Brendan Canty tells his bandmates how his sister's boyfriend believes that Fugazi lives in a house together without heat and subsisting on a steady diet of nothing but rice. Cohen has also said that "[o]ne of the reasons why I work with Fugazi and they work with me is that we enjoy traveling through this madness. It's what they write songs about and it's what I try to document in my films."

== Production ==
Editing of the film was done by both Cohen and the members of the band over the course of five years.

== Soundtrack ==
The Instrument Soundtrack by Fugazi was released in conjunction with the film. It consisted primarily of instrumental and unreleased songs (including many demo cuts from End Hits, their previous album).

== Critical reception ==
Time Out and Variety's reviews for Instrument were generally positive, although they found it to be a bit lengthy, especially for those who do not find themselves to be fans of the band. However, The AV Club pointed out, "if Instrument is purely self-indulgent, Fugazi is one band that has truly earned that luxury." According to DVD Talk, the film "is like a lot of the band's music; straight-ahead, consistently creative and down-to-earth." In an article by The Washington Post discussing both Instrument and Grant Gee's similar contemporaneous documentary Meeting People Is Easy (on Radiohead), the former was found to be "much more fragmented than the Radiohead film. Then again, it's not meant to be a career overview. [...] And while Radiohead seems to take itself a tad too seriously, Fugazi takes itself just seriously enough, even addressing its hardcore-bred penchant for uncompromising ethical stands on everything from merchandising to community commitment (half the concerts in the film seem to be benefits or demonstrations). While they're thoughtful, they're not particularly self-absorbed and seem to actually enjoy what there is to be enjoyed on the road. And the release in Fugazi's music seems as emotionally cathartic for them as it is for their fans."

== DVD extras ==
The DVD release in 2001 included 30 minutes of extra footage not released on VHS in 1999: three full songs - "Waiting Room", "Turnover" and "Long Division" - from various shows and two short films entitled "Glueman" and "Little Flags".
