= The Argument (Fugazi album) =

2001 studio album by Fugazi

Studio album by Fugazi
- Released: October 16, 2001
- Recorded: January–April 2001
- Studios: Inner Ear, Dischord House, Arlington, Virginia
- Genres: Post-hardcore; indie rock; post-punk; art punk
- Length: 44:53
- Label: Dischord
- Producers: Fugazi; Don Zientara

Fugazi chronology
Furniture (2001)	The Argument (2001)	Fugazi Live Series (2004)

The Argument is the sixth and final studio album by American post-hardcore band Fugazi, released on October 16, 2001, by Dischord Records. It was recorded at Don Zientara's Inner Ear Studios in Arlington, Virginia, and the Dischord House between January and April 2001. It was the band's last release (simultaneously with Furniture) before going on hiatus in 2003, until the release of First Demo over thirteen years later.

Upon release, The Argument was met with critical and commercial success. Many critics have called it the band's best album as well as one of the most important releases in the post-hardcore genre.

== Background and meaning ==
The Argument saw Fugazi continue to expand upon the more experimental art punk leanings of Red Medicine and End Hits while also heavily incorporating other instruments, such as piano and cello into their sound. The album also featured the first extensive contributions from outside musicians, most notably longtime stage-tech Jerry Busher, who added percussion on a second drum set to several of the album's songs as well as Kathi Wilcox of Bikini Kill and Bridget Cross of Unrest who provided additional backing vocals.

When asked about the meaning of the album's title by Guitar World in a 2001 interview, singer/guitarist Ian MacKaye described it (and the song title from which the album name comes), as "an anti-war manifesto." MacKaye expanded upon this by stating, "A main point of the song is that I will not agree with war across the board. It also talks about a greater argument: that these giant airplanes are dropping tons of homicidal weaponry, blowing the shit out of everybody, and guys are running around with guns. And that is an argument of colossal scale."

== Writing and recording ==
The band began work on The Argument in 1999, after touring in support of End Hits. This process saw the group taking more time than usual to write and demo material. Each member brought their own individual riffs and ideas to the band, jam on them, and then begin piecing the songs together into various configurations before deciding on what became the final versions.

In some cases, the group picked apart songs that were already written to form completely new works. When asked about this process, and the track "Epic Problem" in particular, singer/guitarist Guy Picciotto explained to Pitchfork Media in 2002: "This time, for some reason, we just came up with a new idea for it. The whole verse for that song is different from what we had before, and then suddenly, the chorus. It's like Lego's. [sic] I mean, that's really the way that we work. We assemble stockpiles of parts and ideas and then we just kind of just keep clicking them together until something works. There's a song, "Full Disclosure," and there's a song, "Strangelight"; for a long time, they were the same song. But if you listen to the record, they don't sound anything alike. It's hard to imagine that they could ever have been linked, but for a long time they were." Other tracks, such as "The Kill" were arranged entirely in the studio.

According to Picciotto, the lyrics to "Oh" are about corporate globalization.

The album's recording sessions took place between January and April 2001 at Inner Ear Studios and Dischord House in Arlington, Virginia, west of Washington D.C. The band once again worked with producer/engineer Don Zientara. During the recording process a considerable amount of time was spent finalizing each song's production, in particular the album's drum tracks, in an effort to give the album a unique feel. Drummer Brendan Canty explained to Modern Drummer that "We recorded them all very differently in terms of the drum sounds. We used a lot of different drum kits, cymbals, snares, and miking techniques.

== Packaging ==
The album's cover features a photographic illustration composed of two tightly cropped images of the bronze relief plaque on the Heald Square Monument in Chicago, Illinois: both arms of Lady Liberty extended in opposite directions, one with a torch in-hand and the other empty. The CD insert has two silver folds that open to reveal a booklet which includes a picture of a plaque memorializing Kent State shooting victim Sandra Lee Scheuer, with her name and the date of her death; May 4, 1970 engraved upon it. When asked about the meaning of the cover in a 2001 interview, Picciotto offered the following: "You'll understand the meaning in time. It's like a chemical—you put it out there and the reaction that it creates is what art is."

== Release and reception ==
Professional ratings
Aggregate scores
Source	Rating
Metacritic	87/100
Review scores
Source	Rating
AllMusic	5/5 stars
Alternative Press	8/10
Entertainment Weekly	B
NME	8/10
Pitchfork	8.5/10
Q	4/5 stars
Rolling Stone	4/5 stars
The Rolling Stone Album Guide	4.5/5 stars
Spin	9/10
The Village Voice	B+

In April 2001, the band toured the US. The Argument was released by Dischord Records on October 16, 2001, along with their EP, Furniture, almost four years after the release of End Hits. Arion Berger of Rolling Stone called it "bracing" and "intellectual", while Chris True of AllMusic referred to the album as "ear-shattering and spine-tingling at once" and stated that "the band has raised the bar for themselves and others once again." He also noted that the album had "touched on strange new territory." Overall critical response to The Argument was very positive. At Metacritic, which assigns a normalized rating out of 100 to reviews from mainstream critics, the album has received an average score of 87, based on 20 reviews.

=== Legacy and accolades ===
The Argument continued to receive acclaim, appearing on a number of year-end lists including those of Pitchfork, Kerrang!, NME, and The A.V. Club. The following year, Spin wrote that with the album, "Fugazi accomplished the rare feat of producing their best album almost 15 years into their career." In 2008, Turner Prize-nominated artist Mark Titchner ranked "The Kill" #1 on his list of the top 10 songs about liberty. The end of the decade saw many (predominantly US) publications including the album on their lists of the best albums of the decade.

Publication	Country	Accolade	Rank
Pitchfork	US	Top 200 Albums of the 2000s	45
Cokemachineglow	Canada	Top 100 Albums of the 2000s	29
Decibel	US	Top 100 Greatest Metal Albums Of The Decade	23
Michigan Daily	US	Top 50 Albums of the New Millennium	40
One Thirty BPM	US	Top 100 Albums of the 2000s	80
PopMatters	US	The 100 Best Albums of the 2000s	66
The A.V. Club	US	The best music of the decade	32
eMusic	US	eMusic's 100 albums of the decade	12

In 2012, Stereogum ranked it the band's best album, writing: "If "post-punk" were a descriptive term rather than a genre invented by journalists, The Argument might be one of the only albums worthy of such a distinction. [...] Only after repeat listens does the album emerge as a definitive statement alongside Daydream Nation, Zen Arcade, or Kid A. Weird, wonky and wonderful, The Argument is Fugazi's masterpiece." The album was positively re-evaluated by many sources prior to the release of First Demo in 2014. The band was included on Consequence of Sound's list of "10 Artists Who Went Out on Their Best Album", with the website writing that The Argument "opens up and reveals itself as a blossoming of the band’s entire career output, shot through with piano, cello, and (yes) acoustic guitar driving some of the fiercest songs Guy Picciotto or MacKaye have wrought together or apart." In an op-ed on the band, Alternative Press wrote that "[t]heir last (not final; remember they’re on hiatus) album [...] found Fugazi as vital, relevant and tuneful than ever. And then that was it: The screen went blank, without build-up or forewarning, as quiet as that album’s title track." "[I]f their first two EPs and Repeater were propaganda to some — releases that commanded the listener to do or not do certain things —" observed Tiny Mix Tapes, "then The Argument was a question mark to all, inviting listeners to hear the band’s point of view and get them to think for themselves."

In 2020, BrooklynVegan included it on their list of "15 albums that defined the 2000s post-hardcore boom", writing that the album "didn't sound like Repeater or "Waiting Room" or like any of the new post-hardcore in 2001, but it sounded fresh and it fit right in with the younger bands who owed their careers to Fugazi." Las Vegas Weekly ranked the album as one of their favorites from the past 20 years.

== Track listing ==
All tracks are written by Fugazi.

No.	Title	Lead vocals	Length
1.	Untitled (Intro)		0:52
2.	"Cashout"	MacKaye	4:24
3.	"Full Disclosure"	Picciotto	3:53
4.	"Epic Problem"	MacKaye	3:59
5.	"Life and Limb"	Picciotto	3:09
6.	"The Kill"	Lally	5:27
7.	"Strangelight"	Picciotto	5:53
8.	"Oh"	Picciotto	4:29
9.	"Ex-Spectator"	MacKaye	4:18
10.	"Nightshop"	Picciotto	4:02
11.	"Argument"	MacKaye	4:27
Total length:			44:53

== Personnel ==
Fugazi

- Guy Picciotto – vocals, guitar
- Ian MacKaye – vocals, guitar, piano
- Joe Lally – bass, vocals
- Brendan Canty – drums, piano

Additional musicians

- Jerry Busher – second drums on "Epic Problem", "Oh", and "Ex-Spectator", percussion on "Cashout", "The Kill", "Strangelight", "Nightshop", and "Argument"
- Bridget Cross – backing vocals on "Life and Limb", and "Full Disclosure"
- Kathi Wilcox – backing vocals on "Full Disclosure"
- Amy Domingues – cello on Intro, "Cashout", and "Strangelight"

Production

- Fugazi – producers, engineer, mixing
- Don Zientara – producer, engineer, mixing
- Chad Clark – CD mastering
- John Loder – vinyl mastering
- Jem Cohen – cover design, photography
- David Bryant – photography
- Steven Skovensky – photography

== Charts ==
=== Album ===
Year	Chart	Position
2001	Billboard 200	151
2001	Independent Albums	1
2001	UK Albums Chart	63

== Awards ==
The Argument won the A2IM (American Association of Independent Music) award for Best Rock Album.

Year	Nominee / work	Award	Result
2002	"The Argument"	Best Rock Album	Won
