= Fugazi Live Series =

Series of live albums by Fugazi

- Set 1, release 1

Live album by Fugazi
- Released: April 2004–present
- Recorded: 1987–2002
- Genre: Post-hardcore
- Length: various
- Label: Fugazi Live Series
- Producer: Fugazi

Fugazi chronology
| The Argument (2001) | Fugazi Live Series (2004) | First Demo (2014) |

Alternative cover
- Set 2, release 1

The Fugazi Live Series is a series of live recordings by American post-hardcore band Fugazi, released on CD in 2004 and 2005 and also on the official Dischord Records Fugazi Live Series website for download beginning on December 1, 2011. As of May 2025, 898 concert recordings have been released for download.

== Background ==
Between 1987 and 2003, Fugazi played about 1,048 concerts in all 50 US states and all over the world. Approximately 952 of these shows were recorded by the band's sound engineers. Beginning in 2004 and continuing into 2005, Fugazi launched a 30 CD Live Series that featured concerts from various points in their career, which were made available for sale via Dischord Records. Continuing with the live series concept and after several years of development on December 1, 2011, Fugazi launched a comprehensive Live Series website through Dischord Records that features 130 of the band's concerts available for download at the suggested price of $5 each or a "pay what you want" sliding scale option for each download between $1 – $100 with the goal of eventually making all recorded shows available for purchase. As of May 2025, all but 54 of the recorded shows are available. For $500 fans can also purchase an "All Access" privilege, which will include access to any future concerts and downloads added to the site.

While each concert was professionally mastered, the recordings capture everything that happened onstage and for preservation's sake the band chose not to edit anything out, singer/guitarist Guy Picciotto explained to the New York Times "We liked this idea of, 'Let's just let it be everything,' " Mr. Picciotto said. "There doesn't have to be the idea that this is the great, golden document. It's all there, and it's not cleaned up. You get what you get." The sound quality also varies as the earliest recordings were made to cassettes, then eventually digital formats such as DAT, CD-R, and ultimately hard drives were used. Each concert page also includes fliers, photographs, and ticket stubs. As a career-spanning archival project, the Fugazi Live Series has few equals, putting the band in the company of acts like the Grateful Dead, Phish, and Pearl Jam, some of the only other artists with such a large volume of concerts available for purchase.

== See also ==
- Fugazi discography
