= Steady Diet of Nothing =

Studio album by Fugazi
- Released: July 1, 1991
- Recorded: January–February 1991
- Studio: Inner Ear (Arlington, Virginia)
- Genre: Post-hardcore
- Length: 36:20
- Label: Dischord
- Producer: Fugazi

Fugazi chronology
| Repeater (1990) | Steady Diet of Nothing (1991) | In on the Kill Taker (1993) |

Steady Diet of Nothing is the second studio album by American post-hardcore band Fugazi, released in July 1991 by Dischord Records. Although a persistent rumor alleges that the title is an allusion to a quote by the late American stand-up comedian Bill Hicks, the album title predates the Hicks quote by several years and was actually thought up by bassist Joe Lally.

Although well received and popular at the time of its release, Steady Diet is often overlooked by many music journalists when writing about Fugazi's career, but remains a favorite among fans of the band.

== Recording ==
Steady Diet of Nothing was recorded during January and February 1991 at Inner Ear Studios and is notable for being the group's first self-produced release. As a result of not having an outside producer besides engineer Don Zientara, the album's recording and mixing sessions were tough on the band. Guy Picciotto said of making the record, "[it] was a tough record for us to make. It was our first attempt at producing and mixing by ourselves, and we didn’t feel like we had a really good handle, technically, on what we wanted to do. And we were also pretty fried from a shitload of back-to-back touring. I appreciate Steady Diet for a lot of things, but there was a flatness to both the performances and the sound that was weird to us." Singer/guitarist Ian MacKaye explained, "It was like we were walking on eggshells, trying not to offend each other. No one would say, "Turn your guitar down," or, "Turn the drums down." So we ended up getting a democratic mix, and a lot of times democratic mixes equal bad mixes. And I feel Steady Diet is a classic example of us being very conservative, although a lot of people think it's our best record."

== Music and lyrics ==
Musically, Steady Diet of Nothing has been described as "the Fugazi album on which the band discover[ed] the art of heaviness." The album is sonically far more sparse than the band's other works, with the conservative, dry production serving to highlight the rhythm section of bassist Joe Lally and drummer Brendan Canty. "Although you could probably trace their influences to numerous sources," wrote Steve Park of The Boston Phoenix, "Fugazi's music is about the natural fusion of two genres: hardcore and reggae. But unlike Bad Brains, they blend genres into a true hybrid rather than two easily distinguishable parts." The band's entry in Trouser Press writes that the album "sets up a dichotomy between razorblade ferocity and methodical determination; pulling firmly with one hand and jabbing angrily with the other, Fugazi opens the door to a world of mixed emotions and conflicting impulses. The pressure instilled by the band’s ability to hold itself to an economical beat and escaping shards of tense guitar is barely relieved by the stormy whorls of flat-out aggression into which they typically feed. (The instrumental “Steady Diet” whips the latter into a dangerous froth.)" It also notes the band's guitar sound ("a loose-stringed jangle like an electrified fence being plucked") and the "urgent" vocals of MacKaye and Picciotto. The guitar tone on "Long Division" has been described as being "so dry, they could have been recorded direct." "Latin Roots" recalled the band's earlier dub-influenced stylings, with Canty laying down a Stewart Copeland-influenced drum beat.

Trouser Press praised the band's avoidance of "obvious" lyrical themes for the most part, noting that: "Unlike most punk anthems, the haiku-like lyrics of “Exit Only” will probably still convey the same meaning 20 years from now." A retrospective write-up on the album by Stylus Magazine's Cosmo Lee similarly writes that: "Unlike, say, Rage Against the Machine's "Killing in the Name," a closed system of slogans, Steady Diet leaves space for interpretation, sonically, lyrically, and visually (the figure on the cover will forever remain inscrutable). In this way, it's Fugazi at their best: ditching the easy answers of Minor Threat, and asking hard questions." The song "Long Division", for example, "examines the slow, no-fault disintegration of a friendship" whereas "Latin Roots" - a song about a "sexual encounter" - sees Picciotto coming to terms with his own Italian ancestry. (AllMusic's Andy Kellman additionally notes that his idiosyncratic vocals on the song result in many of the lyrics being commonly misheard.) The song "Runaway Return" even "recasts the age-old prodigal son story in a modern context." However, much of Steady Diet's lyrics are still political, with Guy Picciotto recalling that the band at the time were affected negatively by the then-ongoing Gulf War: “I think we all started to feel that America was just becoming a madhouse, [...] and it depressed us a lot.” An anti-war theme was noted in the lyrics to "Nice New Outfit" in addition to the band's usual anti-consumerist stance. "Dear Justice Letter" was inspired by Supreme Court liberal stalwart William J. Brennan, who had recently retired. The band addressed the subject of personal freedom on the pro-choice anthem "Reclamation" and "KYEO" ("keep your eyes open") was dedicated by MacKaye to Rodney King during the 'Steady Diet' tour.

== Release ==
Professional ratings
Review scores
| Source | Rating |
|---|---|
| AllMusic | 4/5 stars |
| The Boston Phoenix | 3/4 stars |
| Christgau's Consumer Guide | (neither) |
| The Encyclopedia of Popular Music | 3/5 stars |
| The Great Rock Discography | 7/10 |
| MusicHound Rock | 3/5 stars |
| OndaRock | 8/10 |
| The New Rolling Stone Album Guide | 3.5/5 stars |
| Spin Alternative Record Guide | 9/10 |

Six months before the release, Dischord had pre-orders of over 160,000 for the album. In August 1993, more than two years after the album's release, MacKaye told Billboard magazine that Steady Diet of Nothing had sold 215,000 units. Both MacKaye and Picciotto would later attribute the album's relatively-mild response to the alternative rock boom heralded by the release of Nirvana's Nevermind two months after Steady Diet. According to Picciotto (who was on tour with the band in Australia at the time): “It was like our record could have been a hobo pissing in the forest for the amount of impact it had, [...] Nevermind was so huge, and people were so fucking blown away. We were just like, ‘What the fuck is going on here?’ It was so crazy. On one hand, the shows were bigger, but on the other hand, it felt like we were playing ukuleles all of a sudden because of the disparity of the impact of what they did.” Despite this, Steady Diet of Nothing was the band's first album to chart in the UK, where it peaked at No. 63.

=== Critical reception ===
Steady Diet of Nothing received mostly positive reviews upon release. Steve Park of The Boston Phoenix wrote that the band pulled off "a double triumph by mixing music and politics without diluting the entertainment and adrenaline." He noted, however, that the album failed to capture the "immediate intensity" of their live performances. Andy Kellman wrote that while the album was "not nearly as neck-gnawing as Repeater, Steady Diet still packs a sizable wallop, but with slower tempos and less deliberate instrumentation." He took issue, however, with the vagueness of the lyrics which "border[s] on equivocality at times -- which has its advantages and disadvantages."

A mixed review came from Robert Christgau, who simply awarded the album a "Neither" score, indicating a release that "may impress once or twice with consistent craft or an arresting track or two. Then it won't."

=== Legacy ===
Lost At Sea ranked it the 84th greatest album of the nineties. Gavin Rossdale of Bush included Steady Diet among the 10 albums that changed his life. Both Suuns and Buke and Gase covered the track "Long Division" live. The 2021 Fugazi tribute album Silence Is a Dangerous Sound: A Tribute to Fugazi - featuring bands such as La Dispute, Failure, Shai Hulud, Big Ups, Zao and 38 others - takes its name from a lyric in "KYEO".

== Track listing ==
All tracks are written by Fugazi.

| No. | Title | Lead vocalist | Length |
|---|---|---|---|
| 1. | "Exit Only" | Picciotto | 3:11 |
| 2. | "Reclamation" | MacKaye | 3:21 |
| 3. | "Nice New Outfit" | Picciotto | 3:26 |
| 4. | "Stacks" | MacKaye | 3:08 |
| 5. | "Latin Roots" | Picciotto | 3:13 |
| 6. | "Steady Diet" | | 3:42 |
| 7. | "Long Division" | MacKaye | 2:12 |
| 8. | "Runaway Return" | Picciotto | 3:58 |
| 9. | "Polish" | MacKaye | 3:38 |
| 10. | "Dear Justice Letter" | Picciotto | 3:27 |
| 11. | "KYEO" | MacKaye | 2:58 |
| Total length: | | | 36:20 |

== Personnel ==
Fugazi

- Joe Lally – bass
- Ian MacKaye – guitar, vocals
- Guy Picciotto – guitar, vocals
- Brendan Canty – drums

Technical

- Don Zientara – engineer
- Lucy Capehart – photography
- Adam Cohen – photography
- John Falls – photography
