= In on the Kill Taker =

1993 album by Fugazi

Studio album by Fugazi
- Released: June 1993
- Recorded: December 1992
- Studios: Inner Ear (Arlington, Virginia)
- Genre: Post-hardcore
- Length: 42:13
- Label: Dischord
- Producers: Ted Niceley; Fugazi

Fugazi chronology
Steady Diet of Nothing (1991)	In on the Kill Taker (1993)	Red Medicine (1995)

In on the Kill Taker is the third studio album by the American post-hardcore band Fugazi, released in June 1993 through Dischord Records. It was recorded at Inner Ear Studios and produced by the band and Ted Niceley. In on the Kill Taker captured the aggressiveness of the band's earlier releases while displaying a more diverse range of influences.

Due in part to the popularity of alternative rock in the early 1990s, In on the Kill Taker became the group's first album to debut on the Billboard charts and subsequently became the band's breakthrough album.

== Recording ==
The recording process for the album started in the fall of 1992, when Fugazi began working with producer Steve Albini: the band initially planned to release an EP, including songs they had already been working on for a couple of years in previous practice recordings, before accepting Albini's standing invitation to do a free recording at his Electrical Audio studio, which at the time was located in the basement of his house in Chicago. The sessions ended up strengthening the friendship between the engineer and the members of Fugazi, while producing twelve songs that would eventually make the entirety of In on the Kill Taker; however, the band was unhappy with the result after hearing the rough mixes, and decided to scrap the recordings with the consent of Albini. Less than a month after those sessions, Fugazi decided to re-record the same songs at Inner Ear Studio in Washington D.C., this time with producers Don Zientara and Ted Niceley.

The Chicago sessions meant that Fugazi arrived well-prepared for the second recording. According to singer/guitarist Guy Picciotto, “I think we really worked much harder on getting the songs together. We did a lot more pre-session demos, not just with Albini, but also using an 8-track reel-to-reel that we had bought to record our practices. It really changed the way we were able to work out the songs. It also helped us school ourselves a bit on how to engineer a basic recording.” The slightly more "polished" sound of the record was an intentional result of Niceley "reacting to what he [had] heard from the popular bands with the same DNA as Fugazi that were getting heavy airplay" at the time.

Some of the tapes from the original album sessions with Albini were previously only available through bootleg recordings or on filesharing networks; however, on March 6, 2026, Fugazi made the masters available in an official release, titled Albini Sessions (Benefit for Letters Charity), as a name-your-own-price download exclusive on Bandcamp, with all of the proceeds going to Letters Charity, a non-profit organization Albini volunteered with for decades.

== Music and lyrics ==
Andy Kellman of AllMusic made note of what he considered to be "skinned-knee production values" present on In on the Kill Taker. The material on the album retained the band's aggressive and rhythmic style, but displayed more diversity as well. Fugazi downplayed any conscious efforts to make Kill Taker more experimental or diverse. According to Picciotto “I don’t really think of any of the records as being any more experimental than any of the others, because to us they were all experiments,” he said. “We were just trying to figure stuff out and push ourselves further each time. So to my ear every record sounds like a step forward, or sideways, or at least somewhere else from the one before it.” Matt Diehl of Rolling Stone labelled the album "a virtual encyclopedia of punk-derived musical styles" and recognized a large number of influences from bands such as The Ruts, U.K. Subs (for "Facet Squared" and "Public Witness Program"), Sonic Youth (for "Smallpox Champion"), Gang of Four (for "Cassavetes"), Pylon, "early" R.E.M. (for "Sweet and Low"), and even "the speedy hardcore sound" of MacKaye's former band Minor Threat (for "Great Cop"). "23 Beats Off" earned comparisons to an early Wire track "literally stretched and pulled out to nearly seven minutes, [as] MacKaye goes from singing (as best he can) to screaming about a man who was once “at the center of some ticker tape parade,” who turns into “a household name with HIV.”"

Jason Diamond writing for Pitchfork noted that "[l]yrically, it’s also one of the more ambitious albums from the era. While burying any meaning beneath a pile of words like Cobain or bands like Pavement were so fond of doing was certainly du jour, Fugazi liked to mix things up. Picciotto flexed that English degree he got from Georgetown, while MacKaye’s muses were Marx and issues of The Nation." The open-ended lyrics to the opening track "Facet Squared" "could either be about nationalism or the facades people wear when they go out in public [...]". The Picciotto-written "Smallpox Champion" references the genocides perpetrated by the United States' founding fathers against native Americans. The album's lyrics frequently reference films, in particular the song "Cassavetes" which is a tribute to actor/filmmaker John Cassavetes, as well as a critique of Hollywood culture. The song "Walken's Syndrome" references Woody Allen's film Annie Hall, where Christopher Walken's character feels an urge to crash into oncoming traffic at night.

== Artwork ==
Filmmaker Jem Cohen, a long-time friend and collaborator of the band, was responsible for some of the album's art design and packaging. Found pieces of text and photographs were used to make up the overall layout. The cover image, showing a burned-out gold Polaroid of the Washington Monument, was found by Cohen in the street. The inner sleeve was a piece that Jeremy Blake, a friend of the band, found tacked to a light post in Chicago. The text on the cover side margin and back cover were also found on the ground in New York City by Cohen and contained the phrase "...so I could have tried to put a stop to the hater, the adversary workers, iniquity evildoers. This is big because people in high places are in on the kill taker".

== Release ==
Released in June 1993, In on the Kill Taker was the band's first album to enter the Billboard 200, eventually peaking at No. 153. The album also topped the independent charts of both NME and Melody Maker in the United Kingdom.

=== Tour & popularity ===
By the time the In on the Kill Taker tour was underway, the group began to sell-out large auditoriums and arenas, as well as receive more lucrative major label offers. During the band's sold-out 3-night stint at New York City's Roseland Ballroom in September 1993, music mogul and Atlantic Records president Ahmet Ertegün met with the band backstage in an attempt to sign them. Ertegün offered the band "anything you want," their own subsidiary label and more than $10 million just to sign with Atlantic. Fugazi declined the offer. The organizers of Lollapalooza also attempted to recruit the band for a headlining slot on its 1993 tour, which the band considered but ultimately turned down due to its tickets being priced at $33. An article by The Washington Post published in August that year noted that Kurt Cobain and Courtney Love – "rock's couple of the moment" – had attended a show of theirs in Seattle and even met the band afterwards. It also recounted a similar level of interest from Michael Stipe (who "dance[d] the hokey-pokey in the street in front of the Capitol Theatre with Fugazi drummer Brendan Canty") and Eddie Vedder (who wanted to know where MacKaye and Picciotto lived during a tour of Washington D.C.) as well. A retrospective Pitchfork review from 2018 noted that in the article, "In on the Kill Taker isn’t brought up until somewhere near the bottom of the piece. It was almost like saying that you liked or knew them was like a badge of honor, it absolved you of your own sins. The music was eclipsed by the message."

== Reception ==
Professional ratings
Review scores
Source	Rating
AllMusic	4/5 stars
The Great Rock Discography	7/10
Los Angeles Times	3/4 stars
MusicHound	2.5/5 stars
Pitchfork	8.6/10
Q	2/5 stars
Rolling Stone	4/5 stars
The Rolling Stone Album Guide	4/5 stars
Spin Alternative Record Guide	8/10
Uncut	9/10

The record garnered rave reviews from many publications including TIME and Rolling Stone. Rolling Stone writer Matt Diehl wrote that Fugazi had reclaimed the "only band that matters" label from The Clash. In a year-end round-up of the best albums of the year, Brad Tyer of The Houston Press included the album and called the band "[t]he beating heart of punk rock."

However, the album received mixed reviews as well. In an otherwise positive review, Jonathan Gold of Los Angeles Times thought that on the album, "Fugazi works in more or less the same meta-pop ballpark as Sonic Youth," and further stated: "Fugazi hasn't a whimsical bone in its collective body, and the lyrics dance around the gloomiest topics in oblique college-poetry metaphor." Spin was even more dismissive, calling it "Fugazi's most rigid and predictable album yet" despite its "spunky moments", and criticizing their politics as being didactic.

== Legacy ==
=== Retrospective reviews ===
In on the Kill Taker is now widely seen as the band's breakthrough album. Joe Gross, an independent scholar, authored a book about the album as a part of the 33⅓ series of books dedicated to classic & influential albums, published by Continuum in 2018. In its foreword, critic Rob Sheffield called it "a widely misunderstood album from a widely misunderstood band, and yet it's an album that lies right at the heart of their story." Similarly, AllMusic critic Andy Kellman wrote: "It's probably Fugazi's least digestible record from front to back, but each track has its own attractive qualities, even if not immediately perceptible." Writing for The A.V. Club in 2011, Kyle Ryan ranked it the best album of 1993, writing that it "showed Fugazi finding its equilibrium; it wasn’t that the band had outgrown its punk-rock foundation (and the community its members treasured); Fugazi had expanded punk’s palette." In a very positive retrospective review, Jason Diamond writing for Pitchfork compared the impact of the album to Brian Eno's statement regarding The Velvet Underground's first album: "the hundreds of thousands of people who bought In on the Kill Taker or saw the band as they trekked across America, Canada, Japan, Australia, and New Zealand, that year and beyond, were impacted in some way." In 2021, Uncut wrote that the album "remains one of the finest records of the alternative-rock boom."

=== Accolades ===
Publication	Country	Accolade	Rank
LAS Magazine	US	90 Albums of the 90s	1
Pitchfork	US	Top 100 Favorite Records of the 1990s (original)	24
Magnet	US	10th Anniversary Issue, Top 60 Albums 1993-2003	35
LA Weekly	US	Top Five Best Post-Hardcore Records	4
Kerrang!	UK	100 Albums You Must Hear Before You Die	81
Terrorizer	UK	100 Most Important Albums Of The Nineties	-
Rockdelux	Spain	300 Best Albums, 1984–2014	191

=== Influence, covers and tributes ===
Thursday singer Geoff Rickly has stated that In on the Kill Taker is his favorite Fugazi album. "Public Witness Program" has been covered by Screw 32. It is also the name of a band from Norway. The band Cassavetes took its name from the song of the same name on this album, as did the band Great Cop. Plunderphonics musician Chris Lawhorn used 11 tracks from this album for his album Fugazi Edits. Greg Saunier and André de Ridder along with Stargaze "re-composed" the album in its entirety under the title Instruments, which was released on Record Store Day, 2019. Daniel P. Carter, Laura Pleasants (Kylesa) and Amen Dunes have all called the album one of their favorites.

== Track listing ==
All songs by Guy Picciotto, Ian MacKaye, Joe Lally, and Brendan Canty.

No.	Title	Lead vocals	Length
1.	"Facet Squared"	MacKaye	2:42
2.	"Public Witness Program"	Picciotto	2:04
3.	"Returning the Screw"	MacKaye	3:13
4.	"Smallpox Champion"	Picciotto	4:01
5.	"Rend It"	Picciotto	3:48
6.	"23 Beats Off"	MacKaye	6:41
7.	"Sweet and Low"		3:36
8.	"Cassavetes"	Picciotto	2:30
9.	"Great Cop"	MacKaye	1:52
10.	"Walken's Syndrome"	Picciotto	3:18
11.	"Instrument"	MacKaye	3:43
12.	"Last Chance for a Slow Dance"	Picciotto	4:38

Albini Sessions

Demo album by Fugazi
- Released: March 6, 2026
- Recorded: November 1992
- Studios: Electrical Audio (Chicago, Illinois)
- Genre: Post-hardcore
- Length: 38:52
- Label: Dischord
- Producers: Steve Albini; T.J. Lipple

Fugazi chronology
First Demo (2014)	Albini Sessions (2026)

=== Albini Sessions (Benefit for Letters Charity) ===
All songs by Guy Picciotto, Ian MacKaye, Joe Lally, and Brendan Canty. It was recorded and mixed by Steve Albini in November 1992 and mastered by T.J. Lipple in 2025.

No.	Title	Lead vocals	Length
1.	"Cassavetes (Albini Session)"	Picciotto	2:33
2.	"Facet Squared (Albini Session)"	MacKaye	2:40
3.	"Public Witness Program (Albini Session)"	Picciotto	3:13
4.	"Instrument (Albini Session)"	MacKaye	3:23
5.	"Walken's Syndrome (Albini Session)"	Picciotto	2:54
6.	"Returning the Screw (Albini Session)"	MacKaye	3:14
7.	"Rend It (Albini Session)"	Picciotto	3:50
8.	"Great Cop (Albini Session)"	MacKaye	1:50
9.	"23 Beats Off (Albini Session)"	MacKaye	3:52
10.	"Smallpox Champion (Albini Session)"	Picciotto	3:44
11.	"Last Chance for a Slow Dance (Albini Session)"	Picciotto	4:19
12.	"Sweet and Low (Albini Session)"		3:20

== Personnel ==
Fugazi

- Ian Mackaye – vocals, guitar
- Guy Picciotto – vocals, guitar
- Joe Lally – bass
- Brendan Canty – drums

Technical

- Ted Niceley and Fugazi – production
- Don Zientara – engineering
- Chad Clark – 2004 remastering
- Jem Cohen – graphic concept, assemblage
- Jason Farrell – cover mechanic
- Cynthia Connolly – carry out photo
- The Spectra System – band photo
- Jem Cohen, Jeremy Blake – texts

== Charts ==
=== Original album ===
Chart (1993)	Peak position
UK Albums Chart	24
US Billboard 200	153

=== Albini Sessions ===
Chart (2026)	Peak position
US Billboard 200	197

== Bibliography ==
- Freidman, Glen E. (2007). Keep Your Eyes Open. New York: Burning Flags Press. ISBN 978-0-9641916-8-6.
- Gross, Joe (2018), In on the Kill Taker, New York/London: Bloomsbury Academic, ISBN 978-1-5013-2139-9
- Norman, Tony (1993). "The band that won't sell out: Fugazi still plays by its own rules". Pittsburgh Post-Gazette.
- Wolk, Douglas (2004). "Fugazi". In Brackett, Nathan; Hoard, Christian (eds.). The New Rolling Stone Album Guide (4th ed.). New York: Simon & Schuster. ISBN 0-7432-0169-8.
