= Furniture (EP) =

EP by Fugazi
- Released: October 8, 2001
- Recorded: January–February 2001
- Studio: Inner Ear Studios, Arlington, Virginia
- Genre: Post-hardcore
- Length: 8:51
- Label: Dischord
- Producer: Ian MacKaye, Don Zientara, Fugazi

Fugazi chronology
Instrument Soundtrack (1999)	Furniture (2001)	The Argument (2001)

Professional ratings
Review scores
Source	Rating
Allmusic	4.5/5 stars

Furniture is the fourth and most recent EP released by American post-hardcore band Fugazi. It was recorded in January and February 2001, the same time that the band was recording their last studio album, The Argument. Furniture was released in October 2001 on 7" vinyl and on CD formats.

According to Guy Picciotto, Fugazi opted to release the three songs as a single because including them in The Argument would force them to make it a double album, and they felt there was no point in releasing a double album with only thirteen songs total.

The single’s title track is one of the band's earliest songs, dating back to 1986. It had been performed at the band's first show in 1987 and was recorded as a demo the following year, later released on First Demo. The music for "Hello Morning" was written in 1988, with Picciotto writing the lyrics at a later date.

Portions of "Number 5" originated in "Turkish Disco", a song recorded as a demo in 1997 and released on the Instrument Soundtrack in 1999.

== Track listing ==
All tracks are written by Fugazi.

No.	Title	Lead vocals	Length
1.	"Furniture"	MacKaye	3:35
2.	"Number 5"		3:09
3.	"Hello Morning"	Picciotto	2:06
Total length:			8:51

== Personnel ==
- Ian MacKaye – vocals, guitar
- Guy Picciotto – vocals, guitar
- Joe Lally – bass
- Brendan Canty – drums
- Jerry Busher – second drums on "Number 5"
- Don Zientara, Fugazi – recording at Inner Ear Studios, mixing
