= Name your own price =

Pricing strategy

Name your own price (NYOP) is a pricing strategy under which buyers make a suggestion for a product’s price (unlike the traditional way where sellers quote a certain price) and the transaction occurs only if a seller accepts this quoted price. What happens is that the seller waits for a potential buyer's offer and can then either accept or reject that 'named price' that the user had offered. As the Internet is continuously being developed and online marketplaces are becoming increasingly more popular, consumers have more choices in terms of product pricing. Popularized by the reverse auction pioneer, Priceline.com, such pricing strategy asks consumers to 'name their own price' for various products and services like air tickets, hotels, rental cars, etc. The first bid a consumer places and the subsequent bid increments express the consumer's willingness or unwillingness to haggle. "The economic argument is that the number of bids a consumer submits to win a product in a NYOP auction is determined by the bidder’s intention to trade off higher expected savings from haggling against the associated frictional costs". NYOP retailers do not post a price for their products, and the final price of the transaction is only determined via a "reverse auction process", and these are key features that distinguish hotels and travel intermediaries from NYOP retailers. Similarly, LetYouKnow, Inc. pioneered the application of its own patented matching method within confines of the reverse auction process, whereby consumers name their own price for new vehicles.

Originally, name-your-own-price sales are considered "opaque" by marketers because buyers "don't know the name of the supplier (airline, hotel or car rental company) or the schedule (with air tickets) until after" they make a nonrefundable purchase. Suppliers benefit because they can sell to the most price-conscious buyers/travelers without publicly disclosing those low rates.

== Priceline.com ==
Priceline.com logo

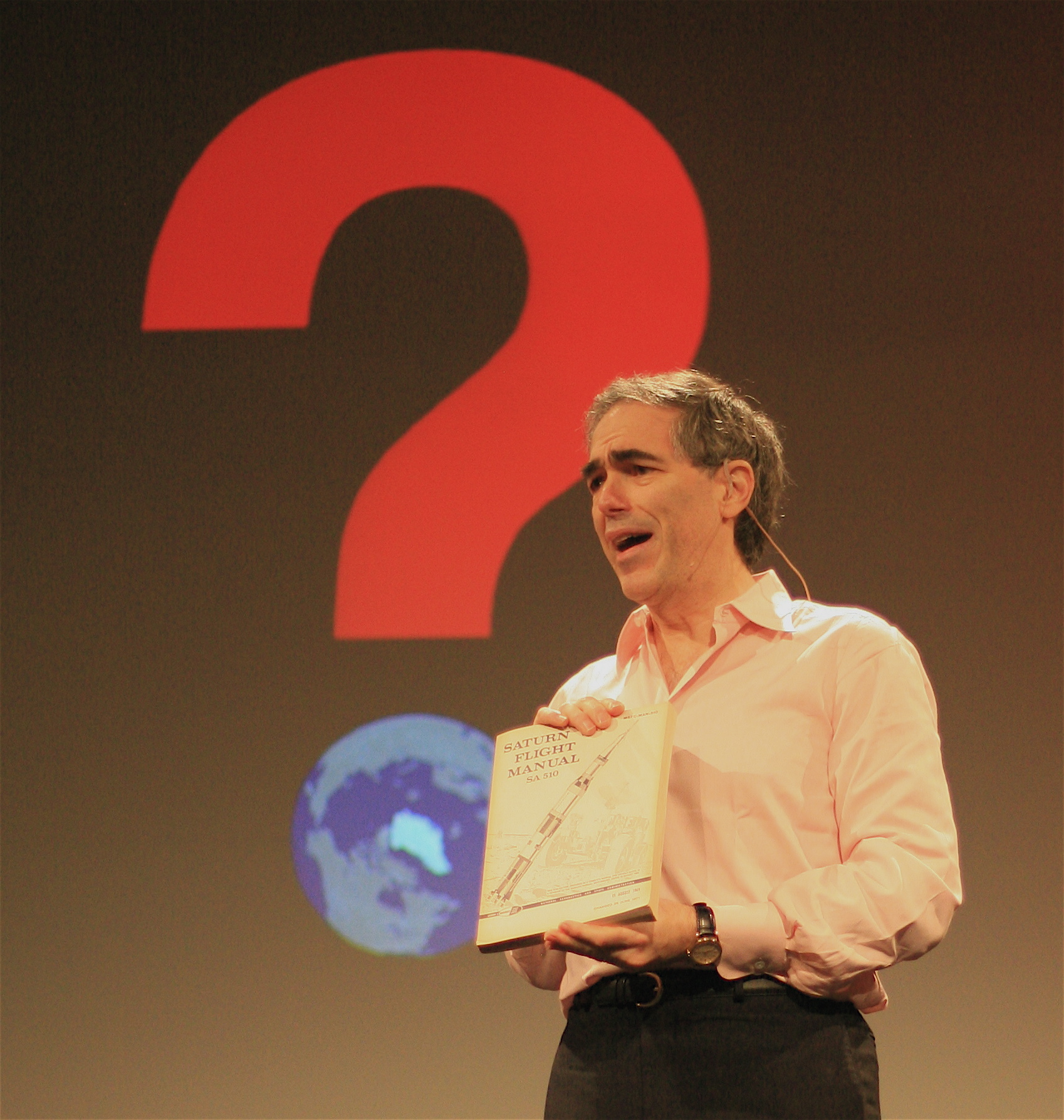
Jay Walker, founder of Priceline.com, shows one of the many artifacts from his library… an Apollo in-flight instruction manual

Priceline.com, an online travel agency offered a name your own price option. However, by 2005, Priceline began to de-emphasize this system, and added published price options on its websites.

A 2014 academic study showed that posted prices can guarantee higher profitability to service providers than the name-your-own-price mechanism.

=== Priceline's price discrimination methods ===
Priceline.com has two different methods of price discrimination according to the product categories offered. For example, for multi-attributable products that are fairly close substitutes, such as hotel accommodation or air travel, Priceline uses a certain price discrimination method where potential buyers place offers on such products, uncertain about some of the attributes of the product. For instance, customers placing offers for air travel are uncertain about the travel schedule in details and do not know which carriers will place their orders, thus allowing Priceline to screen consumers according to their type, and this in turn allows airlines to serve customers that they were not able to distinguish from less price-sensitive customers before.

Priceline used a different price discrimination method for selling undifferentiated goods. Using this method, Priceline used haggling effort—representing consumer effort and time loss from the online haggling process—as a way of discriminating between different customers. For example, a consumer placing an offer for calling capacity can start with a low offer and then—after waiting for a 60-second time period and then getting rejected—the offer is incremented. Before barring customers from submitting additional offers for 24 hours (except when customers used the Priceline app where customer wait times were further reduced to two hours) when Priceline used NYOP, Priceline also previously allowed customers to submit three offers consecutively for the same phone number and the same capacity.

== Consumer interaction with NYOP retailer ==
=== Consumer and wholesaler's perspective ===
Firstly, the consumer is asked to provide certain identification if he/she is an existing user, or to register as a new user. This is followed by the consumer setting an offer for the desired product. Afterwards, the retailer compares the consumer's offered price with an internal threshold price. If the consumer's offer exceeds the threshold, the transaction then occurs at the consumer's named price. If the named price is below the threshold, the NYOP retailer informs the user that his/her offer was too low and then the user is given the opportunity to submit an incremented offer after a certain pre-set delay period (When Priceline had the NYOP feature, it was usually a 24-hour period, unless the customer used the Priceline app, which further reduced the wait time by two hours), and comparison with the internal threshold price is done again.

=== NYOP retailer's perspective ===
The NYOP retailer "acts as an intermediary between the consumer and the wholesaler." The intermediary needs to determine a threshold price above which they are willing to accept the offer from the consumer. As the consumer's offer succeeds, this leads to two sources of profit. The first source is the information rent the intermediary receives, which is the difference between the consumer's submitted offer price and the threshold price. The second source is the difference between the threshold price and the wholesale price, if the NYOP retailer chooses a threshold price that is above the wholesale price. The NYOP retailer also has control over the user interface design. Therefore, the retailer may influence the consumer's haggling effort via the amount of information the consumer has to key in for every offer. In addition, the NYOP retailer is in charge of choosing the time delay between receiving an offer from the consumer and informing him/her about the offer's outcome (whether it is accepted or rejected) and this impacts the consumer's haggling effort directly.

== See also ==
- Pay what you want
