= 3 Songs (Fugazi EP) =

EP by Fugazi
- Released: December 1989/January 1990
- Recorded: July 1989 at Inner Ear Studios
- Genre: Post-hardcore
- Length: 7:27
- Labels: Sub Pop, Dischord
- Producer: Ted Niceley

Fugazi chronology
| 13 Songs (1989) | 3 Songs (1989) | Repeater (1990) |

Professional ratings
Review scores
| Source | Rating |
|---|---|
| AllMusic | 3/5 stars |

3 Songs is a 7-inch EP by Washington, D.C., post-hardcore band Fugazi, and is It was originally released in a collectors edition of 2,000 copies (800 on black vinyl, 1,200 in green vinyl) by Sub Pop Records as the December 1989 issue of their Singles Club. Dischord Records gave the record wider release one month later with different cover and label art. Later that year Dischord coupled the 3 Songs EP with the LP Repeater to make up the Repeater + 3 Songs CD.

"Song #1" was covered by Magnapop on their single "Slowly, Slowly".

== Critical reception ==
New Musical Express gave 3 Songs a positive review, writing that "the Washington serious hardcore giants bring us a tiny slab of life. 'Song #1' is the best thing here, a sexy metal riff with brains under the fine line, 'song number one is not a fuck you song,' and a rock tune, reminiscent, indeed, of the better days of punk rock."

Sounds named 3 Songs its "single of the week" for January 13, 1990. Its critic remarked that "'Song #1' finds Washington's finest in a wonderfully lurching mood, the MacKaye/Picciotto guitar team exploring a riff that lunges in a style not unlike "Wild Thing," while the vocal lashes out at youth culture and blind worship of rock 'n rollers."

A positive review in the punk fanzine Flipside referred to "Song #1" as a "great song" with an "infectious chorus," before declaring "you already know that [3 Songs] is a must have." Ernest Drudge of Alternative Press also reviewed the EP positively, noting that "Song #1" is "the rare kind of song that keeps rock music from choking on its own tail. [...] The music is an indescribable mix of punk, funk, and the Beastie Boys."

A review in Melody Maker was more mixed, with its critic describing the single as "a clipped noise, no sprawl in sight. Fugazi stay buttoned-up. It's a punky rant on somewhat addled themes. [...] It may be drivel, but at least they're urgent, up on their nerves and the balls of their feet."

A retrospective review from AllMusic was favorable, noting:

"Song #1" actually sounds like a Minor Threat song in its directness, doing what it can to make things like records, haircuts, and the thoughts of others seem meaningless in the grand scheme of things -- "Life is what you want it to be." "Joe #1" is an instrumental showcase for bassist Joe Lally, also notable for what seems to be the band's first use of piano. "Break In" is a brief slice of anxious hardcore, thanks to Guy Picciotto's hyper vocalizing and the blazing instrumentation from the usual suspects.

== Track listing ==
All tracks are written by Fugazi.

| No. | Title | Lead vocals | Length |
|---|---|---|---|
| 1. | "Song #1" | MacKaye | 2:54 |
| 2. | "Joe #1" | | 3:01 |
| 3. | "Break-In" | Picciotto | 1:32 |
| Total length: | | | 7:27 |

== Personnel ==
- Ian MacKaye – vocals, guitar & piano
- Guy Picciotto – vocals
- Joe Lally – bass
- Brendan Canty – drums
