= State of the Union (album) =

Compilation album by Various artists
- Released: April 1989 (Remastered 2002)
- Recorded: 1985–1989
- Studio: Inner Ear Studios, Arlington, Virginia
- Genre: Hardcore punk, post-hardcore
- Length: 47:52
- Language: English
- Label: Dischord Records
- Producer: Mark Andersen
- Compiler: Mark Andersen

Professional ratings
Review scores
| Source | Rating |
|---|---|
| AllMusic | 4.5/5 stars |

State of the Union: D.C. Benefit Compilation is a compilation album, compiled by Mark Andersen, that was released on Dischord Records. It consisted of songs from bands active in the Washington, D.C. punk scene during the second half of the 1980s and was a benefit for the American Civil Liberties Union and Community for Creative Non-Violence. All proceeds from the album's sales were donated to these two groups.

Part of the funding for pressing the compilation was derived from a benefit show held on September 3, 1987, at the Wilson Center in Washington, D.C. The concert's lineup featured Marginal Man, Ignition, Fire Party, and the debut performance from Fugazi. The concert raised nearly $1000, which enabled the project to proceed.

== Reception ==
Upon the album's release, Sounds declared "for once, a compilation with music to match its cause."

Option, in a positive review, noted that, although the D.C. scene represented on the compilation had seemingly "mellowed a bit and is somewhat more diverse than before, the drive and caring remain and have intensified. [...] Most of it has a thrashy, hardcore sound and politically-oriented lyrics with roots all the way back to '60s folk/protest singers. No metal, speedcore, or boneheaded attitudes to be seen, but plenty of energy and rock 'n' roll drive. There's lots of power and righteous anger, but it's fueled more by love than by hate, Satan, narcotics, cars, or TV."

No Answers, a punk fanzine published by Kent McClard, wrote that State of the Union and the booklet of liner notes and political information that it included "offers a critique of American society, along with suggestions on how to live an alternative lifestyle that will help to change the destructive nature of our consumerist society. At the very least, the album is an inspiration to those who are searching for a better way of life."

In a contemporary review, Patrick Foster of the punk fanzine Sweet Portable You described State of the Union as:

A thick and searing aggregation of statements that teem with anger and emotional bitterness, drawn directly from the strain of living Washington, D.C.'s daily hardening-of-the-arteries barrage of murder and moralistic neglect. It's anger, captured and collated. Anger turned in the right direction, not blown out through a revolver or funneled backwards into the bloodstream but held over your head as evidence, invoked to suggest and alter. As such, it deserves not only your open-minded and sober consideration, but your complete and undivided attention.

A retrospective review from AllMusic dubbed State of the Union "a significant record and essential to the collection of anyone interested in the history of the D.C. punk scene."

The Washington Post's review was mixed, with critic Mark Jenkins writing "like most compilation albums, this one doesn't hang together that well, despite being an overview of a scene that's both musically and politically linked." Jenkins did note positively that, despite many of the bands on the compilation already being defunct by the time of the record's release, "there's plentiful reason for hope in just one track by a band that's still on-line, Fugazi's magnificently raging "In Defense of Humans."

== Track listing ==
| No. | Title | Writer(s) | Length |
|---|---|---|---|
| 1. | "Ameri-dub" | Scream | 3:19 |
| 2. | "Anger Means" | Ignition | 2:41 |
| 3. | "Name In Mind" | Soulside | 4:13 |
| 4. | "No You Cannot Go" | Broken Siren | 1:44 |
| 5. | "Off Target" | Christ on a Crutch | 3:17 |
| 6. | "Dirty Wings" | King Face | 3:25 |
| 7. | "Worlds at War" | Rain | 2:36 |
| 8. | "Swann Street" | Three | 3:38 |
| 9. | "Stones of a Wall" | Marginal Man | 3:57 |
| 10. | "Burning in the Undertow" | One Last Wish | 2:07 |
| 11. | "In Defense of Humans" | Fugazi | 2:40 |
| 12. | "Responsibility" | Thorns (band) | 1:26 |
| 13. | "Pilate" | Fire Party | 1:38 |
| 14. | "Blood Stone" | Fidelity Jones | 4:16 |
| 15. | "Candle" | Red Emma | 3:45 |
| 16. | "Let It Ring" | Shudder to Think | 3:10 |
| Total length: | | | 47:52 |
