= Fugazi =

American post-hardcore band

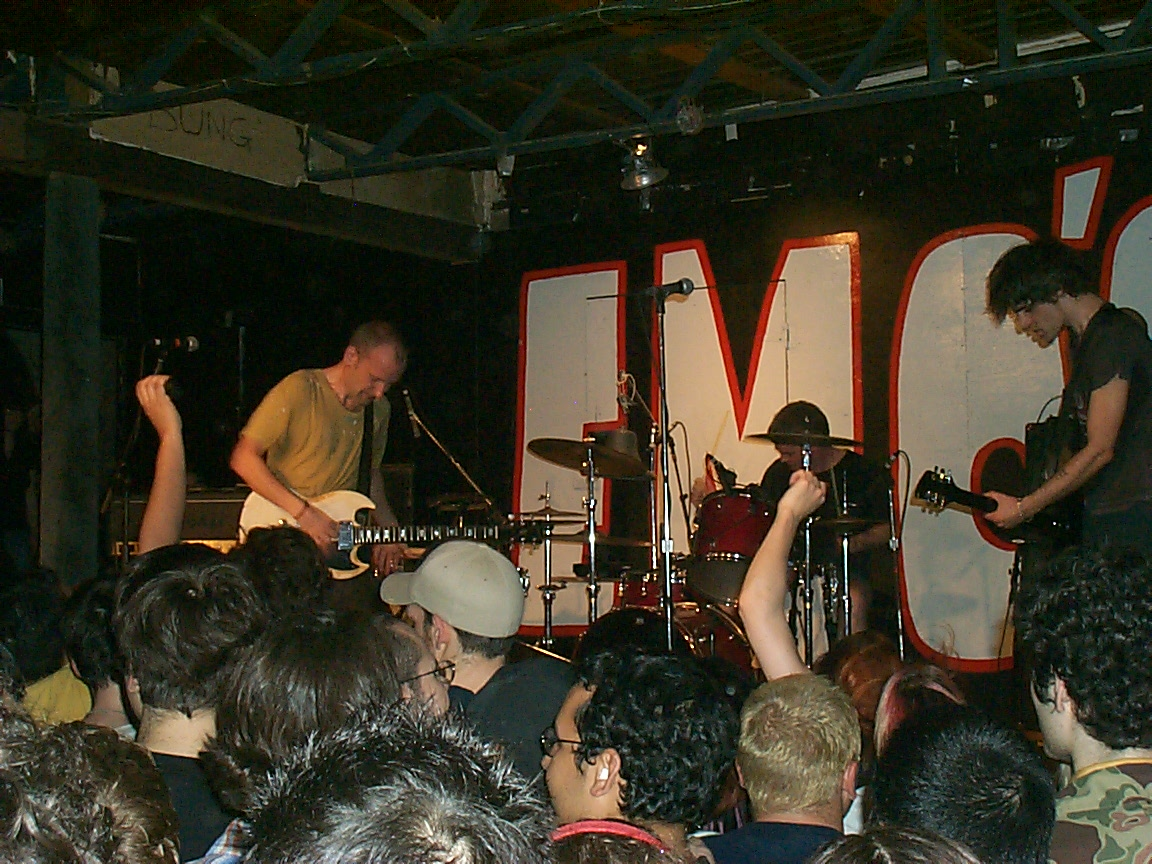
- Fugazi performing at Emo's in 2002; left to right: Ian MacKaye, Brendan Canty and Guy Picciotto (not pictured: Joe Lally)

Background information
- Origin: Washington, D.C., U.S.
- Genres: Post-hardcore; art punk; alternative rock; punk rock; post-punk; experimental rock
- Works: Discography
- Years active: 1986–2003 (Note: Fugazi has been on an indefinite hiatus since 2003, but the group's members have frequently said that the band has not broken up. For more information, refer to § Indefinite hiatus and reunion rumours (2003–present).)
- Label: Dischord
- Spinoffs: The Evens; Coriky; Deathfix; The Messthetics
- Spinoff of: The Teen Idles; Minor Threat; Rites of Spring; Embrace; Egg Hunt; Dag Nasty
- Members: Ian MacKaye; Joe Lally; Brendan Canty; Guy Picciotto
- Past members: Colin Sears
- Website: www.dischord.com/band/fugazi

Fugazi (/fuˈɡɑːzi/; foo-GAH-zee) is (Note: Fugazi has been on an indefinite hiatus since 2003, but the group's members have frequently said that the band has not broken up. For more information, refer to § Indefinite hiatus and reunion rumours (2003–present).) an American post-hardcore band formed in Washington, D.C., in 1986. The band consists of guitarists and vocalists Ian MacKaye and Guy Picciotto, bassist Joe Lally, and drummer Brendan Canty. They were noted for their style-transcending music, DIY ethical stance, manner of business practice, and contempt for the music industry.

Fugazi performed numerous worldwide tours and produced six studio albums, a film, and a comprehensive live series, gaining the band critical acclaim and success around the world. Highly influential on punk and alternative music, the band has been on an indefinite hiatus since 2003, only releasing live compilations and recordings.

== History ==
=== Formation and early years (1986–1989) ===
After the hardcore punk group Minor Threat dissolved, Ian MacKaye (vocals) was active with a few short-lived groups, most notably Embrace. MacKaye realized that he wanted to prioritize making music over being in a band, "because sometimes bands get in the way of music, because you're so focussed on making a band that you forget that it should be about music first." MacKaye had gotten to know Joe Lally, who was working as a roadie for the band Beefeater. After learning Lally played bass, MacKaye asked him if he would be interested in playing together. They soon recruited Dag Nasty drummer Colin Sears, and the trio began practicing around August or September of 1986. MacKaye's original concept for Fugazi was akin to "MC5 plus reggae".

In January 1987, Sears returned to Dag Nasty and was replaced by Brendan Canty, formerly of Rites of Spring. One day, Picciotto, Canty's Rites of Spring bandmate, dropped by during a practice session to see how his friend was getting along; he later admitted he secretly harbored the idea of joining the group. Picciotto was disappointed that there seemed to be no place for him.

After some uncertainty from Canty about what he wanted to do with his future, the trio regrouped and booked their first show at the Wilson Center in early September 1987. The group still needed a name, so MacKaye chose the word "fugazi" (which means "false or inauthentic") from Mark Baker's Nam, a compilation of stories of Vietnam War veterans, in which it is a backronym for "Fucked Up, Got Ambushed, Zipped In [a body bag]".

The band began inviting Picciotto to practices. Inspired by the use of a foil in hip-hop, Picciotto sang backup vocals. After his band Happy Go Licky broke up, he became more involved with Fugazi. MacKaye eventually asked Picciotto to become a full member, and he accepted.

=== Fugazi EP & Margin Walker – 13 Songs (1988–1989) ===
Fugazi embarked on its first tour in January 1988. In June 1988 the band recorded its debut EP Fugazi with producer Ted Niceley and producer/engineer Don Zientara (who became a longtime collaborator), and shortly afterward embarked on an arduous tour of Europe.

At the tour's conclusion in December, the band recorded songs for its intended debut album, but the band was exhausted from touring and found the resulting sessions were unsatisfactory. The track list was cut down to an EP and released as Margin Walker the next year. Both EPs were eventually combined into the 13 Songs, released in late 1989. Upon the band's return from Europe, Picciotto, unsatisfied with singing, began playing guitar too.

=== Repeater and Steady Diet of Nothing (1990–1992) ===
"Repeater"
Sample of "Repeater", from Repeater (1990)

With Picciotto playing guitar full-time, Fugazi made the transition into jamming and writing new material as a band as opposed to performing songs composed solely by MacKaye. In addition to working on new material, songs they had been performing live were refined, such as "Merchandise" and "Turnover", for inclusion on their first official full-length studio album.

Released on April 19, 1990, through Dischord Records, Repeater did not initially reach the Billboard 200 charts or become a commercial success. But the band spent most of 1990 and 1991 touring heavily behind Repeater, performing 250 concerts between March 1990 and June 1991, routinely selling out 1,000-plus capacity venues throughout the world. By summer 1991, the album sold more than 300,000 copies, a large number for a label that relied on minimal promotion. Major labels began to court Fugazi, but the band stayed with Dischord. It was critically well received and featured an alternative rock sound that predated significant releases such as Nirvana's Nevermind and Pearl Jam's Ten, which unexpectedly broke the genre into the mainstream.

For Fugazi's second studio album, Steady Diet of Nothing, released in July 1991, the band again asked Ted Niceley to produce. Niceley had become a chef and had to reluctantly turn down the job, so the band decided to produce the record themselves. After the success of Repeater and its subsequent world tour, Steady Diet was highly anticipated. Six months before its release Dischord had more than 160,000 pre-orders for the album.

=== In on the Kill Taker and Red Medicine (1993–1996) ===
Fugazi recorded its third album, In on the Kill Taker, in the fall of 1992 with Steve Albini in Chicago, but the results were deemed unsatisfactory and the band rerecorded the album with Niceley and Don Zientara. With the breakthrough of alternative rock in the early 1990s, In on the Kill Taker; released on June 30, 1993, became the group's first record to enter the Billboard album charts, receiving critical praise from Spin, Time and Rolling Stone, and becoming the band's breakthrough album.

By the In on the Kill Taker tour, the group began to sell out large auditoriums and arenas and receive more lucrative major label offers. During its sold-out 3-night stint at New York City's Roseland Ballroom in September 1993, music mogul and Atlantic Records president Ahmet Ertegun met with the band backstage in an attempt to sign them. Ertegun offered the band "anything you want", their own subsidiary label and more than $10 million just to sign with Atlantic. Fugazi declined. The organizers of Lollapalooza also attempted to recruit the band for a headlining slot on its 1993 tour, which the band considered but ultimately turned down.

"Combination Lock"
Sample of "Combination Lock", from Red Medicine (1995)

Fugazi began writing the material for Red Medicine in late 1994, after touring in support of In on the Kill Taker. The band worked with Zientara but chose not to work with Niceley again. Fugazi opted to retreat from the in-your-face production values of In on the Kill Taker and instead worked to create an ambient sound that displayed greater range and depth. To achieve this, the band handled production duties itself, and in doing so, became more confident with in-studio experimentation. Red Medicine has been seen as an introduction to the art rock aesthetic that would continue in the band's next two studio albums. The band began an extensive worldwide tour in support of the album, playing 172 shows between March 1995 and November 1996.

=== End Hits and The Argument (1997–2002) ===
After the grueling worldwide tour the band completed in support of Red Medicine, Fugazi took an extended break and also began writing material for a follow-up release. By March 1997 Fugazi had once again returned to Inner Ear Studios with Zientara to begin recording what became End Hits, with the intention of taking a more relaxed approach to recording and a longer amount of time to experiment with different songs and techniques in the studio. The group ultimately spent seven months recording the album. Due to the title, rumors began circulating at the time that it was to be their last release.

Released on April 28, 1998, the album was commercially successful and marked one of the band's highest debuts yet on Billboard's charts. Critical reaction to End Hits was mixed. Many critics praised its heavier tracks, while others questioned the inclusion of the group's longer, more experimental songs. Fugazi elected to bring in their former roadie Jerry Busher as a second drummer in order to replicate the drum overdub-heavy sound of the album live.

"Full Disclosure"
Sample of "Full Disclosure", from The Argument (2001)

Fugazi began work on The Argument in 1999. This process saw the group taking more time than usual to write and demo material. Each member brought his own riffs and ideas to the band, jammed on them, and then began piecing the songs together into various configurations before deciding on the final versions. The album's recording sessions took place between January and April 2001 at Inner Ear Studios and Dischord House in Arlington, Virginia. The band once again worked with Zientara. During the recording process a considerable amount of time was spent finalizing each song's production, in particular the album's drum tracks, in an effort to give it a unique feel. Canty told Modern Drummer, "We recorded them all very differently in terms of the drum sounds. We used a lot of different drum kits, cymbals, snares, and ways of miking."

The Argument was released by Dischord Records on October 16, 2001, along with the EP Furniture. Arion Berger of Rolling Stone called the album "bracing" and "intellectual" and Chris True of AllMusic "spine-tingling and ear-shattering all at once", writing, "the band has raised the bar for themselves and others once again." He also wrote that the album had "touched on strange new territory". By this point Fugazi was on tour less, due in large part to other professional and personal commitments. It performed only 32 shows in 2001 and 2002. Even though the number of performances dwindled, during Fugazi's last tour they performed in front of over roughly 70,000 people.

=== Indefinite hiatus and reunion rumours (2003–present) ===
Fugazi went on what it has called an "indefinite hiatus" after concluding its 2002 UK tour with three sold-out nights at the London Forum on November 2–4. The hiatus was brought on by the band members' insistence on spending more time with their families and pursuing other projects.

Since Fugazi went on hiatus in 2003, rumors began circulating about a reunion, with some insinuating that the band might get back together to headline the Coachella Festival. The band has confirmed that it has been offered large sums of money to reunite and headline festivals, such as Coachella, but it has so far declined the offers.

In March 2011, MacKaye reiterated that Fugazi has "been offered insane amounts of money to play reunions, but it's not going to be money that brings us back together; we would only play music together if we wanted to play music together and time allowed it".

In November 2011, when asked by The A.V. Club about the possibility of a reunion and a followup to The Argument, Lally said: "The Argument was a great record that we should try and top. It'll take some time to come together and everything. To do that, we'd have to—the way the four of us are, we would take quite some time, I think, reassociating ourselves musically, and then just letting it come about naturally, because it would have to be a natural thing. So we'll just see."

In August 2014, Dischord announced the official release of First Demo, an album featuring 11 demo songs recorded in January 1988. The announcement included a preview of the demo for the Fugazi track "Merchandise". The album was released on November 18, 2014.

MacKaye insisted in a 2017 interview that Fugazi is not, in fact, broken up. While he admits any future public performance will have to contend with various confounding factors, the members have occasionally played together privately since their 2003 hiatus. In a March 2018 interview, Lally confirmed the band's irregular practice of casual get-togethers: "Yeah, when we're all in D.C., we totally hang out together and talk and spend a lot of time laughing. We have a great time together, go out to dinner, and we'll play some music together." He also said that additional public performances or tours were unlikely: "There's so much to try to look after to allow Fugazi to do anything that we do not have the time to give it the respect that it deserves. So unfortunately, it is where it is."

On February 13, 2019, Louder Sound asked Lally and Canty about the possibility of Fugazi returning. Lally responded: "You never want to say never about anything, because how can you say that about the future? But there does seem to be a lack of time to allow it to happen, because the four of us would have to spend a lot of time together to figure out, 'Should we play old songs?' 'Who are we now?' 'What is it now?' We are not the kind of band to get together and just rehearse two hours of old songs to go out and play it, rake in the dough and come home." Canty added, "If we got back together it would have to be from the spirit of creativity. It would be different if we got back together."

On March 6, 2026, Fugazi released the band's original In on the Kill Taker sessions, recorded with Steve Albini, as a digital-only, name-your-own-price download album on Bandcamp titled Albini Sessions (Benefit for Letters Charity), with all the proceeds going to Letters Charity, a nonprofit organization with which Albini and his wife, Heather Whinna, worked extensively.

== Side projects and related work ==
In the hiatus, the members undertook side projects, with MacKaye forming the duo The Evens with his wife, drummer and singer Amy Farina (formerly of the Warmers).

In 2004, MacKaye produced the DC EP for Red Hot Chili Peppers guitarist John Frusciante, which also featured Jerry Busher.

Canty has been doing a variety of soundtrack scores and playing bass in the trio Garland Of Hours alongside frequent Fugazi guest contributors Jerry Busher and Amy Domingues, and has played bass live with Mary Timony. Canty also appears on Bob Mould's 2005 album, Body of Song, and on Mould's 2008 album, District Line, and has toured with Mould, appearing in the live DVD, Circle of Friends. He is currently working in the Burn to Shine DVD series which is being released by Trixie DVD. Now, he is playing in Deathfix alongside Devin Ocampo (Medications, Faraquet, Smart Went Crazy, Beauty Pill), Rich Morel (Bob Mould, Blow Off), and Mark Cisneros (Medications, the Make-Up). They released their album in February 2013 on Dischord Records.

Lally has released three solo albums, There to Here (2006), Nothing Is Underrated (2007), and Why Should I Get Used to It (2011). He has also appeared on fellow DC post-punkers Decahedron's debut album, Disconnection_Imminent, as well as on a project with Red Hot Chili Peppers guitarists John Frusciante and Josh Klinghoffer, known as Ataxia. The group has recorded two albums, Automatic Writing (2004) and AW II (2007).

Picciotto currently works as a record producer most notably with Blonde Redhead and the Blood Brothers, and he has performed alongside members of The Ex at the Jazz festival in Wels, Austria. Picciotto also contributed guitar on two Vic Chesnutt albums, 2007's North Star Deserter and 2009's At the Cut (co-producing the latter), for Constellation Records, and performed live with Chesnutt and members of Thee Silver Mount Zion Memorial Orchestra and the Quavers in Jem Cohen's program entitled "Evening's Civil Twilight in Empires of Tin at the Vienna International Film Festival (Viennale) in 2007 (a DVD of the program was released in 2009). Picciotto played guitar on Chesnutt's Fall/Winter 2009 North American Tour. He's also worked as a producer for the project Xylouris White, and is considered by the members to be a "non-performing" member.

In July 2011, Minneapolis based record label Doomtree released an album of mash-ups between Fugazi and east coast veteran rap crew the Wu-Tang Clan. The album is titled 13 Chambers and the group's name is Wugazi. However, Fugazi itself did not have any involvement with the release. Bassist Joe Lally was asked about his thoughts on the Wugazi release, and stated "I think they could've found better Fugazi pieces to sample with Wu-Tang guys rapping on it. I mean, it's enjoyable, and I do appreciate it for the fact that somebody enjoys our music enough to bring it into that. But, you know, I don't know. I guess I should shut up, because I suppose I'm about to run into these people at the Fun Fun Fun Fest festival and talk to them. But I'm afraid that is my opinion on it. It's like, get better samples of our stuff, do better work."

In October 2012, Chris Lawhorn released Fugazi Edits. The album includes 22 instrumental tracks, which sample 100 songs from Fugazi's discography. As in other cases, the band had no involvement in the album's production, but it was authorized for release by MacKaye, with the proceeds going to charity.

In 2013, Brendan Canty released a collaborative album along Rich Morel under the name Deathfix and toured briefly from 2012 to 2014. In 2016, Canty and Lally joined with guitarist Anthony Pirog to form the Messthetics, Canty and Lally's first project together since Fugazi's hiatus. In March 2018, the Messthetics released their self-titled debut album and embarked upon a tour in the US and Japan. The band toured further and released a second album entitled Anthropocosmic Nest in 2019.

In 2018, Ian MacKaye, Amy Farina and Joe Lally debuted a new band. In February 2020, it was announced that the band, now called Coriky, would release their first album on March 27, 2020. The debut single, "Clean Kill", was released on February 11, 2020. The band previewed their album at a free show in D.C.'s St. Stephen and the Incarnation Episcopal Church on February 22, 2020. Due to the COVID-19 pandemic, the release of Coriky's self-titled album was delayed to June 12, 2020, in part to accommodate independent record stores closed due to the pandemic. Upon release the record was favorably reviewed in a few publications; often drawing comparisons and contrasts with MacKaye and Farina's other band the Evens, as well as Fugazi.

== Live performances ==
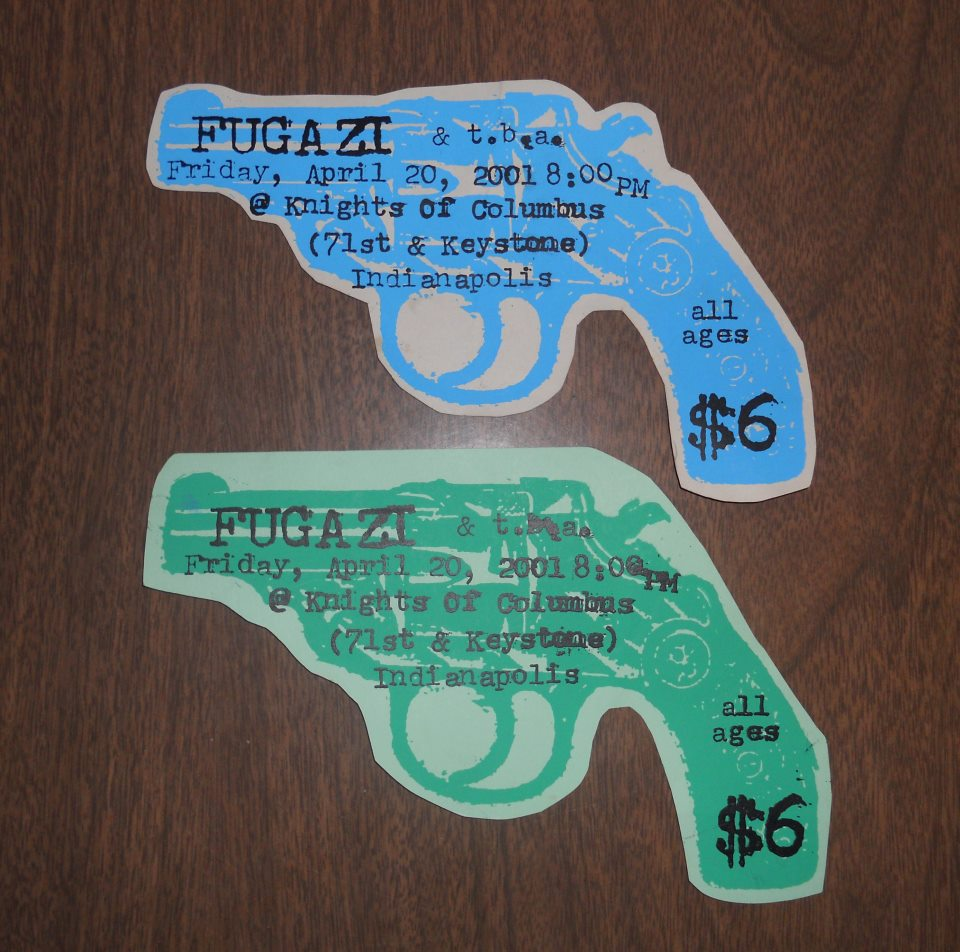
Handmade tickets for a Fugazi concert from 2001 in Indianapolis, Indiana

Between 1987 and 2003, Fugazi played at least 1,055 documented concerts in all 50 US states and all over the world. Over 800 of these shows were recorded by the band's sound engineers. Beginning in 2004 and continuing into 2005, Fugazi launched a 30 CD Live Series that featured concerts from various points in their career, which were made available for sale via Dischord Records. Continuing with the live series concept and after several years of development on December 1, 2011, Fugazi launched a comprehensive Live Series website through Dischord Records that features 750 recordings available for download at the suggested price of $5 each or a "pay what you want" sliding scale option for each download between $1–100 with the goal of eventually making all 800 of the shows that have been recorded available for purchase. For $500 fans can also purchase an "All Access" privilege which will include access to any future concerts and downloads added to the site.

While each concert was professionally mastered, the recordings capture everything that happened onstage and for preservation's sake the band chose not to edit anything out, singer/guitarist Guy Picciotto explained to the New York Times, "We liked this idea of, 'Let's just let it be everything,' ... There doesn't have to be the idea that this is the great, golden document. It's all there, and it's not cleaned up. You get what you get." The sound quality also varies as the earliest recordings were made to cassettes, then eventually digital formats such as Digital Audio Tape, CD-R, and ultimately hard-drives were used. Each concert page also includes flyers, photographs and ticket stubs. As a career-spanning archival project, the Fugazi Live Series has few equals, putting the band in the company of acts like the Grateful Dead, Phish and Pearl Jam, three notable examples of other artists with such a large volume of concerts available for purchase.

For the first time, in May 2025, Fugazi began to release complete live shows on streaming services and Bandcamp. On May 1st, the bands first show (September 3, 1987 at Wilson Center in Washington, DC) and the band's to-date final performance (November 4, 2002 at The Forum in London, UK) were posted, and it was announced that select shows will be released every month for the rest of 2025.

== Musical style and influences ==
Fugazi's style has been described as post-hardcore, art punk, alternative rock, experimental rock, punk rock and hardcore punk. According to Alternative Press, Fugazi is not an emo band, despite being closely "linked to its story." Fugazi's music was an intentional departure from that of the hardcore punk bands the members had played in previously. Fugazi combined punk with funk and reggae beats, irregular stop-start song structures, and heavy riffs inspired by popular rock bands such as Led Zeppelin and Queen, bands that the punk community of the time largely disdained. When questioned by Guitar World in 2002 about the band's influences, singer/guitarist Ian MacKaye responded, "Too many to mention. And not just from the last few years. Some of them predate us by decades, and most of them wouldn't be punk. I would hope any musician would be inspired by a lot of different kinds of music." Fugazi's influences include Bad Brains, the Faith, Void, Minutemen, Black Flag, Sonic Youth, the Ex, the Beatles, and the Obsessed.

Picciotto became the group's second guitarist when he realized MacKaye's typically chunky, low-end riffs and Lally's dub-influenced basslines allowed him to focus on high-pitched parts. In both vocal and guitar roles, Picciotto assumed the role of a foil to MacKaye; employing a Rickenbacker guitar for its scratchy single-coil sound in order to "cut through MacKaye's chunky chording like a laser beam." Their inventive, interlocking guitarwork often defies the traditional notion of "lead" and "rhythm" guitars and features unusual and dissonant chords and progressions filtered through a hardcore punk lens. Later, Fugazi more fully integrated elements of punk rock, hardcore, soul and noise with an inventively syncopated rhythm section.

Picciotto's assumption of guitar duties allowed all four members of the band to jam together and write songs that way, where previously they had played songs largely as MacKaye had arranged them. When writing songs, the band often rearranges them with different structures and different singers. Spin has listed MacKaye and Picciotto together at No. 86 on their list of the 100 Greatest Guitarists of All Time for their unique and interlocking guitar style in Fugazi.

Generally, MacKaye's lyrics and singing are more direct and anthemic (MacKaye admits that he loves audience sing-alongs and writes songs with shout-able slogans), while Picciotto usually favors a more abstract, oblique approach. Lally has contributed vocals to a few songs as well, in which he sings in a more relaxed, quiet style as opposed to MacKaye and Picciotto, whose lyrics and vocals often feature strong emotional intensity.

Each of Fugazi's albums since Repeater have featured an instrumental. By the time of 1995's Red Medicine bassist Joe Lally also began contributing vocals to the band and the group was implementing many of their broader influences into the overall sound. Critics Ian McCaleb and Ira Robbins declared that Fugazi's music combined an "unprecedented dynamic range ... and previously unimagined elements" such as "clattering musique concrète ... pian] and sound effects ... murky dub and lancing clarinet" and "loose-limbed jammy funk ... into an ambitious, experimental format that raises more stylistic questions than it answers."

== Ideology and views ==
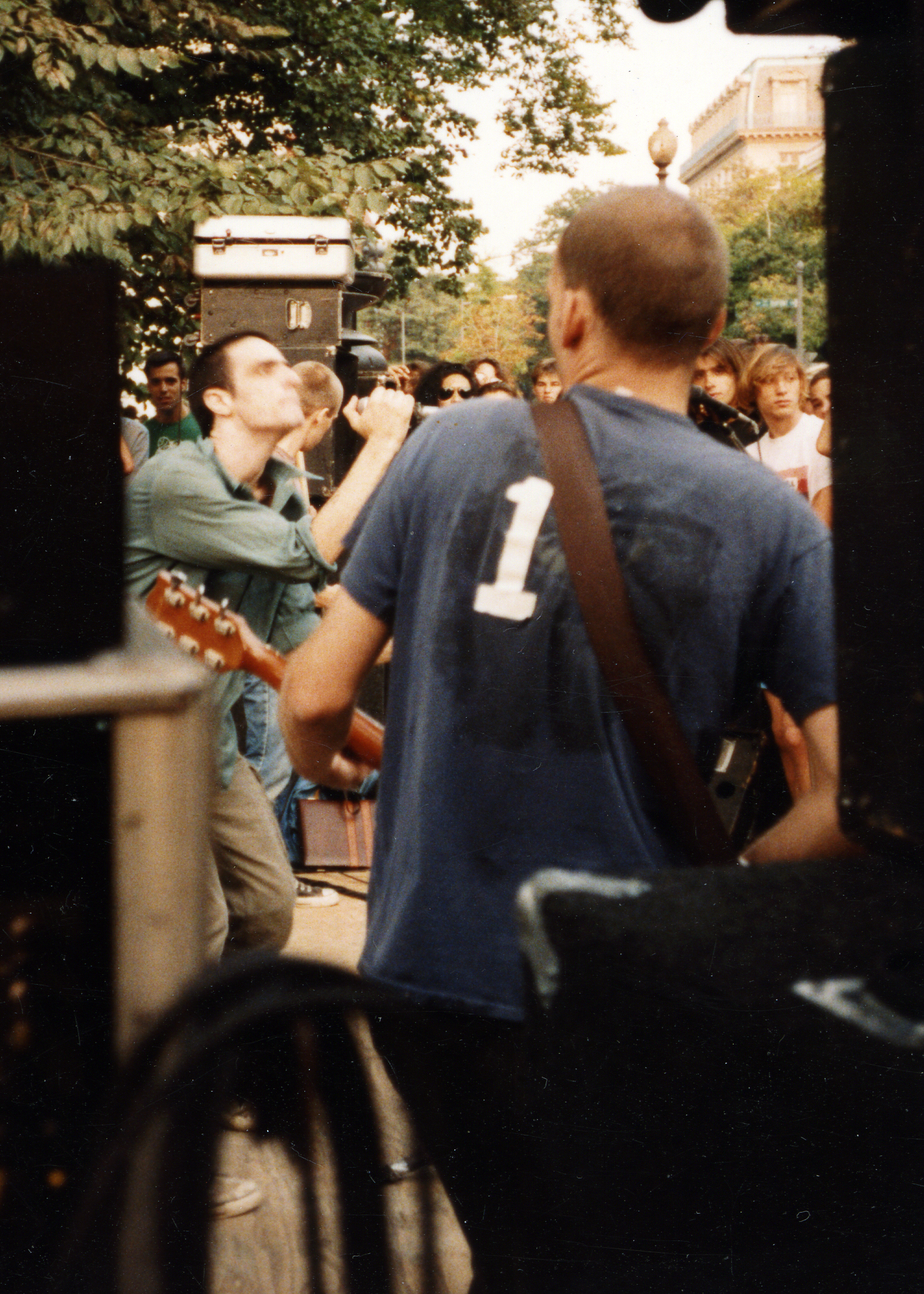
Fugazi performing at the 1988 Alternatives Festival in Washington D.C.

Fugazi is well known for their members' refusal to sign to or work with corporate record labels, instead choosing to release their albums through Dischord. Despite receiving offers from major labels like Atlantic Records, the band were adamant about retaining their independence. MacKaye has stated that "no amount of money is worth losing control of our music."

On their first tours, Fugazi worked out its DIY ethic by trial and error. Their decisions were partly motivated by pragmatic considerations that were essentially a punk rock version of simple living: for example, selling merchandise on tour would require a full-time merchandise salesperson who would require lodging, food, and other costs, so Fugazi decided to simplify their touring by not selling merchandise. The band was also motivated by moral or ethical considerations: for example, Fugazi's members regarded pricey admission for rock concerts as tantamount to price gouging a performer's most loyal fans. Fugazi's inexpensive target goal of $5 admission was spawned during a conversation on an early tour when the band's members were debating the lowest profitable admission price. Everett True has said that MacKaye and Fugazi "had a mind-set that believed that any involvement with the system was corrupting and that you should create completely alternative structures outside".

In later years, Fugazi was unable to negotiate ticket prices below about $10–$15 total. However, it never saw the $5 rule as inviolable, instead aiming to charge a price that was both affordable and profitable. Unlike some similar, independent rock contemporaries, Fugazi's performances and tours were always profitable, due to the group's popularity, low business overhead costs, and MacKaye's keen sense of audience response in given regions. Many times the band performed sold-out shows multiple consecutive nights at the same venue.

Fugazi's early tours earned it a strong word of mouth reputation, both for its powerful performances, and also for the band's eagerness to play in unusual venues. The group sought out alternatives to traditional rock clubs partly to relieve the boredom of touring, but also hoping to show fans that there are other options to traditional ways of doing things. As Picciotto said, "You find the Elks Lodge, you find the guy who's got a space in the back of his pizzeria, you find the guy who has a gallery. Kids will do that stuff because they want to make stuff happen."

The group, and MacKaye in particular, also made a point of discouraging violent, unwanted slam dancing and fist fights. This was not only due to them seeing violence as a relic of the early 1980s hardcore punk era, but also due to financial concerns; moshing often denoted the installation of costly barricades to prevent injuries in the crowd. MacKaye recounted in an interview: "We played one show to 4000 people one night and the barricade made more money than we did: the barricade cost more than we made. And that's not even factoring in the 30 security staff you have to hire to man that barricade."

Michael Azerrad quotes Mackaye, "See, [slam dancers] have one form of communication: violence ... So to disorient them, you don't give them violence. I'd say, 'Excuse me, sir ...'- I mean, it freaks them out – 'Excuse me, sir, would you please cut that crap out?'" Azerrad writes: "[MacKaye's] admonitions seemed preachy to some. And by and large, people would obey – it wasn't cool to disrespect Ian MacKaye." Occasionally, Fugazi would have an unrepentant slam-dancer escorted from the concert, and give them an envelope containing a $5 refund (the group kept a stock of such envelopes in their tour van for these occasions).

During the summer of 1990, MacKaye formed the corporation Lunar Atrocities Ltd. in order to shield his own and his bandmates' personal assets from the threat of lawsuits. As MacKaye's financial advisor, Seth Martin, explained to The Washington Post in a 1993 interview: "protection from liability is the main reason to form a corporation, and for these guys it makes sense. If someone got hurt stage-diving and decided to sue, it would be harder to go after their personal assets."

== Influence and legacy ==
I just think of it as part of the reciprocal process inherent in the way music works. Ideas and inspiration are just handed down the line from band to band from generation to generation. For us, we came up completely in awe of bands like the Bad Brains – they lit a fire in us and we just did our best to pass that feeling on to other people in our own way.

— Guy Picciotto on the band's influence.

Fugazi's music and ethics have been immensely influential on punk and alternative music throughout the years, and has earned the band praise from many notable musicians as well. Sublime "thanked" the band by namedropping them on their debut album. At the Drive-In called the band an influence on their own music, as did other notable post-hardcore bands such as Refused, Quicksand, Thrice, Thursday, Cursive, Cap'n Jazz, Braid, and Mclusky. Former At the Drive-In guitarist Jim Ward has also noted Fugazi as a major influence of his during the recording process for his band Sparta's first album Wiretap Scars. John Frusciante named them an influence on Red Hot Chili Peppers' Californication and on his solo album, The Will to Death. Nirvana cited the band as an influence, and Kurt Cobain—who was a friend of the members of Fugazi—was even spotted in a popular photo of the band with the word "Fugazi" misspelt on both shoes. Eddie Vedder of Pearl Jam remarked that witnessing the band live "was a life-changing experience" for him. Jimmy Eat World have also named Fugazi as an influence, and frontman Jim Adkins has noted that both MacKaye and Picciotto's playing styles made him "more open to the ideas behind guitar playing, as opposed to the technical difficulty of it.". Reportedly a huge fan, Elliott Smith was "super-obsessed" with the band and later admitted that his former band Heatmiser was "trying to be Fugazi". The Smiths guitarist Johnny Marr offered the band praise, and called MacKaye one of his favorite guitarists.

Towards the end of his life, Joe Strummer, lead vocalist of the Clash, recognized Fugazi as the band that best exemplified "the spirit of punk" in a 2000 Rolling Stone interview, besides offering them accolades on several other occasions. In 1993, Joey Ramone of the Ramones picked the band as a favorite, labeling them a "great social conscience". Graham Coxon of Blur recalls his introduction to bands such as Fugazi (and the Picciotto-led Rites of Spring) in the mid 1990s as being one of the most musically significant moments of his life: "They used the guitar in an incredible way; making quite restrained noisy music, which I'd never heard English bands doing." Daniel Kessler of Interpol has also cited the band as an influence on his guitar-playing, as has Colin Frangicetto of Circa Survive, and Gareth Liddiard of the Drones and Tropical Fuck Storm. Tim Commerford of Rage Against the Machine found the band's music on Repeater revelatory, as did Steve Holmes of American Football. Tom DeLonge of Blink-182 called the band a big influence as they "stood for something and never varied from that path." "Fugazi was probably my biggest influence as far as wanting to start a band", Modest Mouse founding member Jeremiah Green admitted, "It was really great music and just sounded like something I could possibly do." When asked to name some of his favorite records or discographies, Brian Cook of Botch (and later Russian Circles) included the band's entire discography amongst others. Gogol Bordello's Eugene Hutz called the band's debut EP "probably the best I ever heard. It's so together and everything sits in the right place." Jeff Rosenstock not only called the band a big influence on his music, but also on his strict DIY business practices & ethics. Sunny Day Real Estate cited the band as an influence for similar reasons.

The band has been cited as an influence by Tool bassist Justin Chancellor, Jack White, Sepultura vocalist Derrick Green, Carrie Brownstein of Sleater-Kinney, Chester Bennington of Linkin Park, Dashboard Confessional, the Kills, Face to Face, the Futureheads, the Get Up Kids, ...And You Will Know Us by the Trail of Dead, Dillinger Escape Plan guitarist Ben Weinman, OK Go frontman Damian Kulash, Rise Against frontman Tim McIlrath, Daniel Johns of Silverchair, Biffy Clyro frontman Simon Neil, Justin Pierre of Motion City Soundtrack, Prong frontman Tommy Victor, Efrim Menuck of Godspeed You! Black Emperor, Dylan Baldi of Cloud Nothings, Arcade Fire lead singer Win Butler, Paul Dempsey of Something for Kate, Travis Morrison of the Dismemberment Plan, Brand New guitarist Jesse Lacey, Converge singer Jacob Bannon, Coalesce, Ben Lee, Patterson Hood of Drive-By Truckers, Pretty Girls Make Graves guitarist J. Clark, Explosions in the Sky, Kele Okereke of Bloc Party, Trevor de Brauw of Pelican, Matty Healy of the 1975, Mary Timony, Hayley Williams of Paramore, Justin Vernon of Bon Iver, and Lorde.

== Members ==
=== Final lineup ===
- Brendan Canty – drums (1987–2003)
- Joe Lally – bass, vocals (1986–2003)
- Ian MacKaye – vocals, guitar, piano (1986–2003)
- Guy Picciotto – vocals, guitar, clarinet (1988–2003)

=== Former members ===
- Colin Sears – drums (1986)

=== Touring musicians ===
- Jerry Busher – additional drums, percussion, trumpet (1998–2002)

== Discography ==
- Fugazi (1988)
- Margin Walker (1989)
- 3 Songs (1989)
- 13 Songs (1989) (Note: Released as a compilation of the band's prior two EPs and is commonly referred to as their debut release.)
- Repeater (1990)
- Repeater + 3 Songs (1990)
- Steady Diet of Nothing (1991)
- In on the Kill Taker (1993)
- Red Medicine (1995)
- End Hits (1998)
- Instrument Soundtrack (1999) (Note: Released as a soundtrack album of then-new material.)
- Furniture (2001)
- The Argument (2001)

== See also ==
- Fugazi discography
- Fugazi Live Series
- List of songs recorded by Fugazi

== Sources ==
- Andersen, Mark; Jenkins, Mark (2001). Dance of Days: Two Decades of Punk in the Nation's Capital. New York: Akashic Books. ISBN 1-888451-44-0.
- Azerrad, Michael (2001). Our Band Could Be Your Life: Scenes from the American Indie Underground, 1981–1991. Boston: Little, Brown. ISBN 0-316-78753-1.
- Brace, Eric (August 1, 1993). "Punk Lives! Washington's Fugazi Claims It's Just a Band. So Why Do So Many Kids Think It's God?". The Washington Post. Washington DC. p. G1.
- Baker, Mark (1983). Nam. Berkley. ISBN 0-425-06000-4.
- Freidman, Glen E. (1994). Fuck You Heroes: Glen E. Friedman Photographs, 1976-1991. New York: Burning Flags Press. ISBN 978-0964191600.
- Freidman, Glen E. (2007). Keep Your Eyes Open: Fugazi. New York: Burning Flags Press. ISBN 978-0-9641916-8-6.
