= Guy Picciotto =

Musical artist (born 1965)

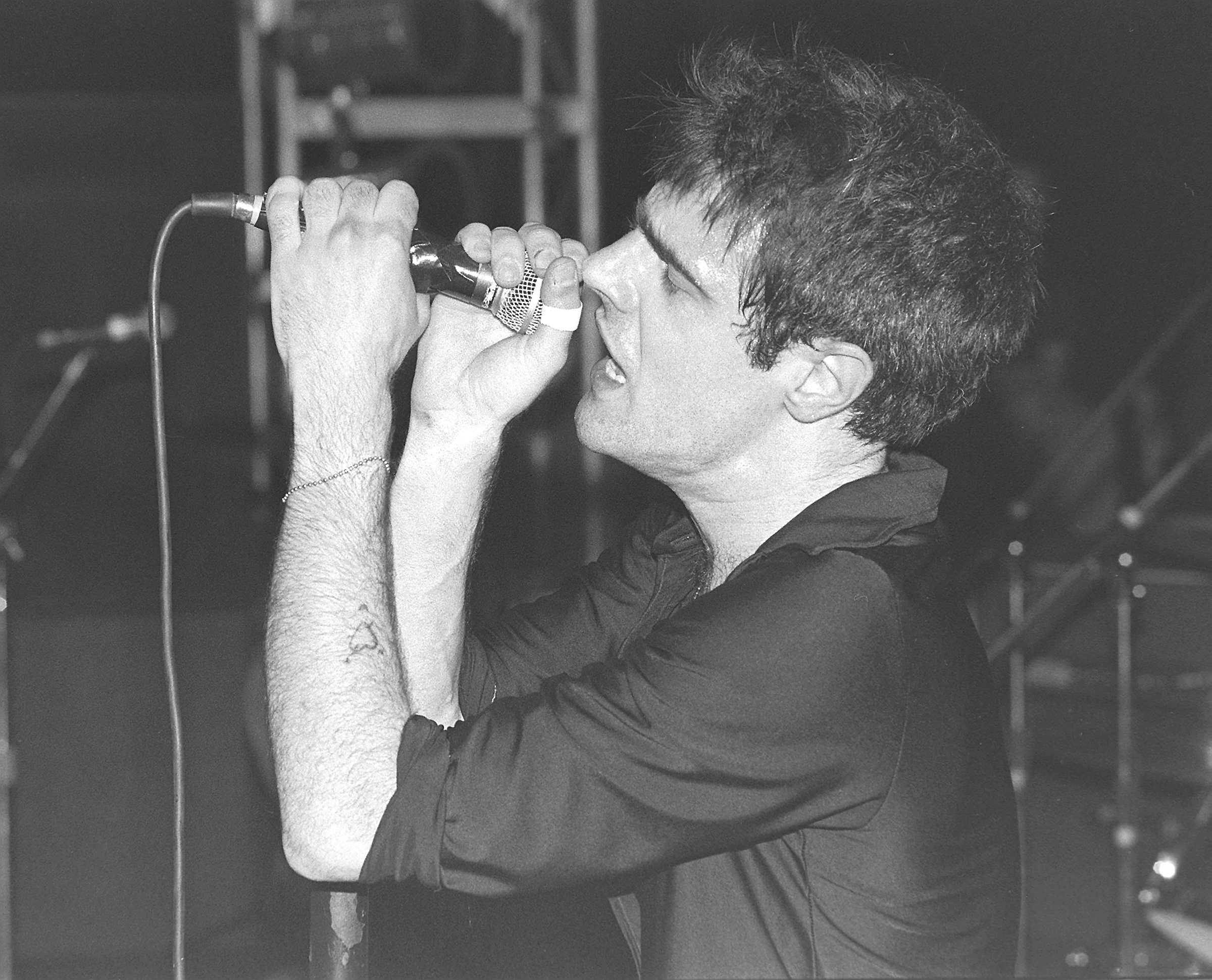
- Picciotto performing with Fugazi in 1996

Background information
- Born: September 17, 1965 (age 61); Washington D.C., U.S.
- Genres: Post-hardcore; noise rock; emocore; hardcore punk
- Occupations: Songwriter; musician; producer; engineer
- Instruments: Vocals; guitar; clarinet
- Years active: 1982–present
- Labels: Dischord; Peterbilt
- Formerly of: Fugazi; Rites of Spring; Happy Go Licky; One Last Wish

Guy Picciotto (/ˈɡiː pɪˈtʃoʊtoʊ/ GHEE pih-CHOH-toh; born September 17, 1965) is an American songwriter, musician, and record producer from Washington, D.C. He is best known as the guitarist and co-lead vocalist in Fugazi and as lead vocalist of Rites of Spring.

== Career ==
=== Rites of Spring and early projects ===
Picciotto's career as a guitarist and vocalist began in 1984, with the group Rites of Spring. A part of the D.C. post-hardcore scene, Rites of Spring increased the frenetic violence and visceral passion of hardcore while simultaneously experimenting with its compositional rules. Picciotto, as the band's lyricist, as well as singer and guitarist, shifted hardcore into intensely personal realms and, in doing so, is generally credited with creating emo.

Picciotto's early musical resume includes the bands Insurrection (1982-83) where he only played guitar, One Last Wish (1986), Happy Go Licky (1987–88), Brief Weeds (EPs released circa 1991–92), and The Black Light Panthers (ongoing sporadic project since 1982). Every band Guy has been a member of has been alongside drummer Brendan Canty. He created a record label called Peterbilt Records, which released limited-quantity vinyl record albums for the bands Rain, Happy Go Licky, and Deadline, then years later was involved in releasing the album 1986 by One Last Wish, along with Dischord Records.

=== Fugazi ===
Though not in the original lineup of Fugazi, Picciotto joined very early in the group's career, singing with them by their second show and appearing on all the band's studio recordings. From the Repeater album on, he took up second guitar duties, playing characteristically trebly Rickenbacker guitars. After six albums, 4 EP's, and over 1000 live performances, Fugazi went on "indefinite hiatus" in 2003.

=== Side projects and production work ===
Picciotto has collaborated and performed with Mats Gustafsson, Vic Chesnutt, and members of the Ex among others. He has produced numerous albums including the Gossip's breakthrough record Standing in the Way of Control as well as Blonde Redhead's Melody of Certain Damaged Lemons (2000) and Misery Is a Butterfly (2004), The Blood Brothers final album, Young Machetes, and Downtown Boys' Cost of Living (2017) as well as two records for The Casual Dots, their self-titled debut album and the follow-up Sanguine Truth (2022). Additionally, Picciotto has produced all five albums by duo Xylouris White. His role is so valued by the band that they consider him a "non-performing" third member. Picciotto also co-produced the drummer Jim White's first solo album All Hits : Memories (2024).

Picciotto played on the Vic Chesnutt albums North Star Deserter (2007) and At the Cut (2009), and accompanied him on tours of Europe and North America. He co-produced the films Chain and Museum Hours with Jem Cohen (who made the Fugazi film Instrument).

In 2012, Picciotto was interviewed on stage at the Pop Montreal festival by Howard Bilerman about his experiences in the music industry. On January 24, 2020, Guy appeared on an episode of Live From the Barrage for a wide-ranging discussion that was his first long form interview in quite some time.

== Personal life ==
Picciotto was born to an American mother and an Italian father. He holds a BA degree in English from Georgetown University and is a graduate of the Washington, D.C. private school, the Georgetown Day School.

Picciotto married musician Kathi Wilcox from the bands Bikini Kill and the Frumpies; in 2013 the two were reported living in Brooklyn with their child.

== Equipment ==
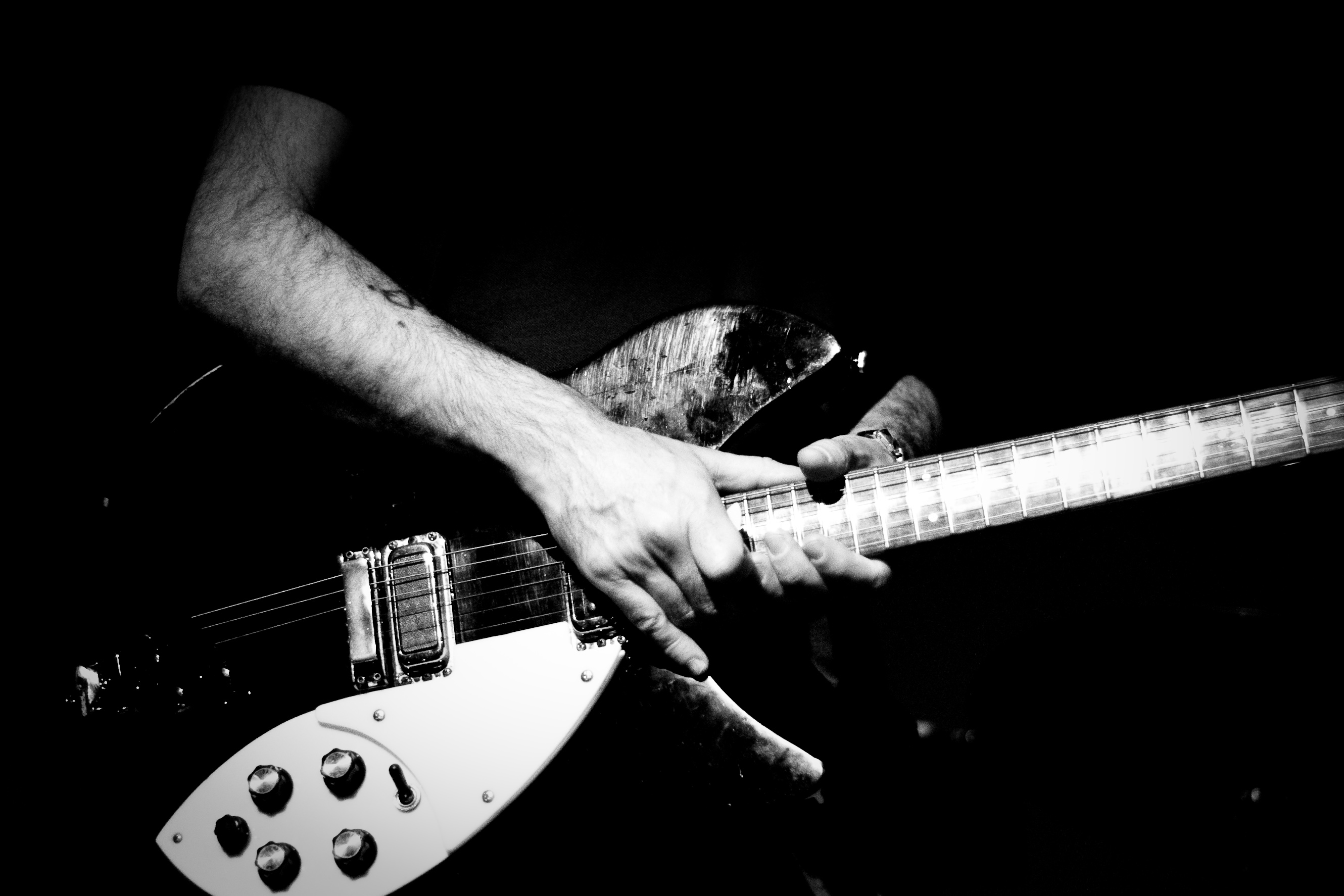
Picciotto holding his guitar immediately before performing with Vic Chesnutt in 2009

=== Guitars ===
- Rickenbacker 330 – Picciotto's main guitars are a sunburst Rickenbacker 330 and 2 identical black Rickenbacker 330's all equipped with RIC HB1 humbuckers. He has occasionally been seen playing a natural-finish 330. The characteristically trebly Rickenbackers allowed Picciotto to make use of sonic space not taken by MacKaye's chunkier, rhythmic guitar playing in Fugazi.
- Rickenbacker 370 – Picciotto's main guitar when he fronted Rites of Spring, One Last Wish and in the first few years with Fugazi was a Mapleglo Rickenbacker 370. It eventually ended up in a state too fragile for live use, but he still used it in the studio right up to The Argument.
- Gibson Les Paul Jr. – During Picciotto's time with Rites of Spring and during the early days of Fugazi (photos show until at least as late as 1993), he could also be seen playing a white Gibson Les Paul Doublecut Jr. with a single P90 pickup. In an interview done in 2011, Picciotto is quoted as having had a Gibson SG Jr. stolen in New York City. The NPR article may be incorrect about it being an SG and it was likely the same Les Paul Jr. guitar.

=== Amplification ===
- Park 100 Watt heads
- Marshall JCM 800 2203 heads
- Red or Black Marshall JCM 800 4x12 cabinets fitted with 75-watt celestion speakers
- Fender Twin reverb (studio)

== Discography ==
=== Fugazi ===
- Fugazi (November 1988)
- Margin Walker (June 1989)
- 3 Songs (December 1989)
- Repeater (March 1990)
- Steady Diet of Nothing (August 1991)
- In on the Kill Taker (May 1993)
- Red Medicine (June 1995)
- End Hits (April 1998)
- Instrument Soundtrack (1999)
- Furniture (October 8, 2001)
- The Argument (October 16, 2001)

=== Rites of Spring ===
- Rites of Spring (1985)
- All Through a Life (1987)
- End on End (1991)
- Six Song Demo (2012)

=== One Last Wish ===
- 1986 (1999)

=== Happy Go Licky ===
- 12" (1988)
- Will Play (1997)

=== Vic Chesnutt ===
- North Star Deserter (2007)
- At The Cut (2009)

=== Black Light Panthers ===
- Peterbilt 12" 82-97 (1997)

=== Brief Weeds ===
- A Very Generous Portrait (1990)
- Songs of Innocence and Experience (1992)
