= Repeater (album) =

Studio album by Fugazi
- Released: April 19, 1990
- Recorded: July–September 1989
- Studio: Inner Ear (Arlington, Virginia)
- Genres: Post-hardcore; alternative rock
- Length: 35:01; 42:29 (Repeater + 3 Songs)
- Label: Dischord
- Producers: Fugazi; Ted Niceley

Fugazi chronology
3 Songs (1989)	Repeater (1990)	Steady Diet of Nothing (1991)

Repeater is the debut studio album by the American post-hardcore band Fugazi. It was released on April 19, 1990, as Repeater on LP, and in May 1990 on CD bundled with the 3 Songs EP as Repeater + 3 Songs. It was recorded at Inner Ear Studios in Arlington, Virginia, and produced and engineered by Don Zientara and Ted Niceley. The album cover was based on a photo by Jim Saah.

Repeater is often regarded as a definitive album for the band and a landmark of rock music. It has been described as an "angrier American update of Gang of Four's Solid Gold." It has also been noted for its complex interplay of guitar and rhythm section. It is included in the book 1000 Recordings to Hear Before You Die.

== Background and recording ==
By 1989, Fugazi had made the transition into jamming on and writing new material as a band as opposed to playing songs composed solely by singer/guitarist Ian MacKaye. After the completion of several lengthy U.S. and European tours, they began to work on new material as well as refining songs that they had already been performing live, such as "Merchandise" and "Turnover" - the latter of which was originally titled "NSA" in its original form - featuring MacKaye on vocals.

The band once again chose to work with both Don Zientara and Ted Niceley as they had previously, and entered Inner Ear Studios in July 1989 to begin the recording process. The group was only able to record with Niceley present between the hours of 9 a.m. and 1 p.m. because Niceley was splitting his time between the studio and culinary school. Recording for the album was completed in September 1989.

== Music and lyrics ==
According to music journalist Andrew Earles, "Repeater is where the already lock-tight Fugazi raised the bar it already set with an angrier, faster, tighter denser modus operandi than anything demonstrated on either of the band's previous two EPs. The album's third track "Brendan #1" is instrumental. The album's sixth track "Sieve-Fisted Find" is said to contain "furious miniature guitar riffs that interlock." According to Andy Kellman of AllMusic, "Repeater sounds like an angrier American update of Gang of Four's Solid Gold." He explained that "MacKaye and Picciotto's noise-terrorism-as-guitar-joust avoids flashiness, used as much as rhythm as punctuation device. Sharp, angular, jagged, and precise."

The album's lyrics are anti-capitalist in nature, and explore themes such as greed, violence, sexuality, privacy, drug abuse and death. MacKaye told Guitar World that the album title "is loaded on so many levels. It's actually about how things in life repeat over and over. But the title is also a rather obscure nod to The Beatles' Revolver. A record revolves and it also repeats. A revolver is also a gun, and so is a repeater. The title track is about kids repeatedly shooting each other and references the crack cocaine-related violence in Washington, D.C. in the 1980s."

== Release and reception ==
Professional ratings
Review scores
Source	Rating
AllMusic	4.5/5 stars
The Encyclopedia of Popular Music	4/5 stars
The Great Rock Discography	8/10
MusicHound Rock	3/5 stars
OndaRock	9/10
The Rolling Stone Album Guide	4/5 stars
Spin Alternative Record Guide	6/10
Uncut	8/10
The Village Voice	A−

Released on April 19, 1990, through Dischord Records, Repeater did not initially reach the Billboard 200 charts or become a commercial success. However, the band spent most of 1990 and 1991 touring heavily, performing a total of 250 concerts between March 1990 and June 1991, routinely selling out 1,000+ capacity venues all over the world.

The Los Angeles Times stated that the band "mixes the raw independence of Black Flag and the political insistence of Gang of Four". The Washington Post concluded that Repeater "captures much of the band's passion and immediacy: the steel-spring rhythms of drummer Brendan Canty and bassist Joe Lally, the weaving, parrying and intersecting guitars and voices of Ian MacKaye and Guy Picciotto, and the clear-eyed moral vision of its lyrics."

While major labels began to court Fugazi, the band decided that Dischord was distributing their records well enough and refused the offers. According to Alan O'Connor in his 2008 book Punk Record Labels and the Struggle for Autonomy: The Emergence of DIY, Repeater went on to sell 500,000 copies (based on an interview with Dischord Records).

== Legacy and influence ==
Repeater featured an alternative rock sound that predated significant releases such as Nirvana's Nevermind and Pearl Jam's Ten, which would unexpectedly go on to break the genre into the mainstream. Tim Commerford of Rage Against the Machine was influenced by the album, as were Steve Holmes of American Football and Metz. Ben Weinman of the Dillinger Escape Plan named it one of his favorite records of all time.

The track "Merchandise" has been covered by Face to Face (on their album Standards & Practices), Ted Leo and the Pharmacists and Dogstar. "Blueprint" was covered by Gogol Bordello live, Ben Lee and Tim Timebomb. The track was quoted by the Knife on the track "Raging Lung" off of Shaking the Habitual. It has also been sampled by Emynd for Stranger Day's track "Not Playin'". "Styrofoam" has been covered by Stereotyperider. "Shut the Door" has been covered by Boy Eats Drum Machine.

=== Accolades ===
Publication	Country	Work	Accolade	Year	Rank
Spin	US	Repeater	The 300 Best Albums of the Past 30 Years (1985–2014)	2015	70
Spin	US	Repeater	The 90 Greatest Albums of the '90s	1999	36
Alternative Press	US	Repeater	The 90 Greatest Albums of the 90's	1998	23
Pitchfork	US	Repeater	Top 100 Albums of the 90s	1999	52
Pitchfork	US	Repeater	The 150 Best Albums of the 1990s	2022	145
LostAtSea	US	Repeater	90 Albums of the 90s	2000	51
Complex	US	Repeater	The Best Indie Rock Albums of the ’90s	2013	15
Loudwire	US	Repeater	The Best Hard Rock Album of Each Year Since 1970	2017	N/A
Consequence	US	Repeater	The 100 Greatest Albums of All Time	2022	97
Kerrang!	UK	Repeater	The 100 Greatest Rock Albums	2006	57
Kerrang!	UK	Repeater	The 50 Most Influential Albums of All Time	2003	7
Rockdelux	Spain	Repeater	The 300 Best Albums from 1984-2014	2014	58
Pitchfork	US	"Repeater"	Top 200 Tracks of the 90s	2010	58
Loudwire	US	Repeater	The Best Hard Rock Album of Each Year Since 1970	2024	1

== Track listing ==
All tracks are written by Fugazi.

Side one
No.	Title	Lead vocalist	Length
1.	"Turnover"	Picciotto	4:16
2.	"Repeater"	MacKaye	3:01
3.	"Brendan #1"		2:32
4.	"Merchandise"	MacKaye	2:59
5.	"Blueprint"	Picciotto	3:52

Side two
No.	Title	Lead vocalist	Length
1.	"Sieve-Fisted Find"	Picciotto	3:24
2.	"Greed"	MacKaye and Picciotto	1:47
3.	"Two Beats Off"	Picciotto	3:28
4.	"Styrofoam"	MacKaye	2:34
5.	"Reprovisional"	Picciotto	2:18
6.	"Shut the Door"	MacKaye	4:49
Total length:			35:01

3 songs
No.	Title	Length
1.	"Song #1"	2:54
2.	"Joe #1"	3:01
3.	"Break-In"	1:32
Total length:		42:29

== Personnel ==
Fugazi

- Brendan Canty – drums
- Joe Lally – bass
- Ian MacKaye – vocals, guitar, piano
- Guy Picciotto – vocals, guitar

Technical

- Ted Niceley, Fugazi – producer
- Don Zientara – engineer
- Jim Saah – photographer
- Kurt Sayenga – design
