= Brendan Canty =

American drummer (born 1966)

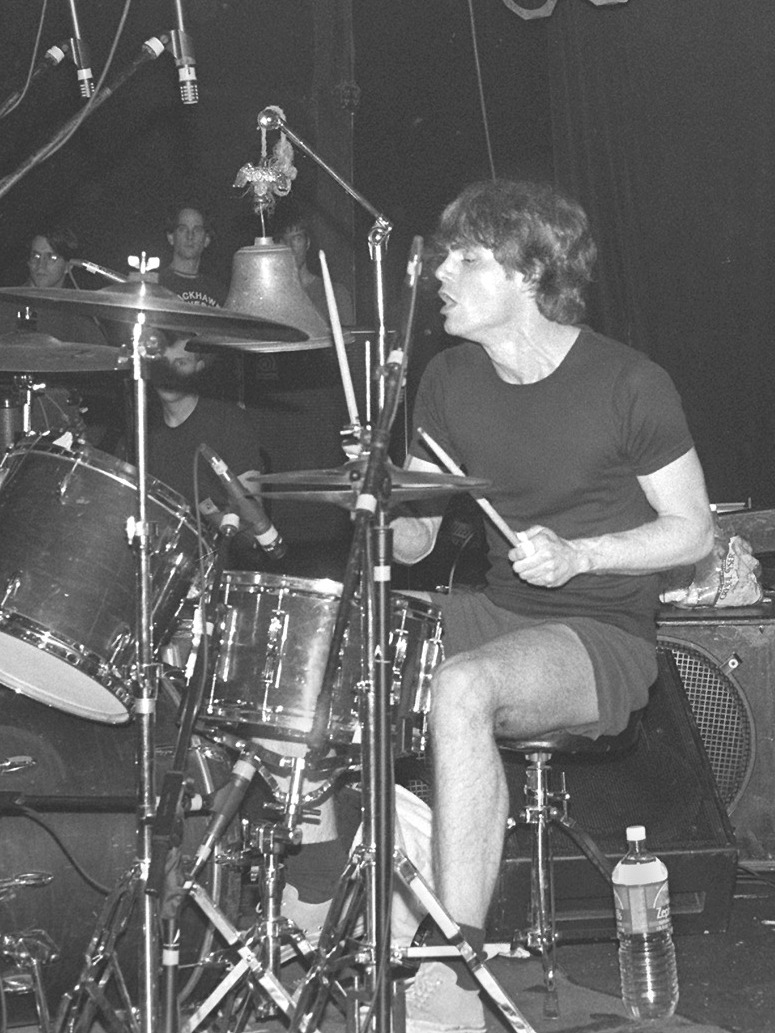
- Canty performing with Fugazi in 1996

Background information
- Born: March 9, 1966 (age 60); Teaneck, New Jersey, U.S.
- Genres: Alternative rock; indie rock; post-hardcore; hardcore punk; post-punk; punk rock; emo
- Occupations: Musician; composer; producer; film maker

Brendan John Canty (born March 9, 1966) is an American musician, composer, producer and filmmaker, best known as the drummer for the band Fugazi.

In 2007, Stylus Magazine ranked Canty at No. 29 on the list of "50 Greatest Rock Drummers".

== Biography ==
=== Early years, Rites of Spring ===
Brendan Canty was born in Teaneck, New Jersey, and grew up in the Cleveland Park neighborhood of Washington, D.C., where his family moved when he was 10 months old. He began playing drums at the age of 15, debuting in Dischord Records band Deadline, one of the signature bands of the early D.C. hardcore scene in the summer of 1981. They recorded a demo at Inner Ear Studios that autumn, and from those sessions three tracks were used on the Dischord "Flex Your Head" compilation. After playing a number of shows through the following year, Deadline recorded one more session at Inner Ear in August 1982, just prior to disbanding. Canty continued his musical career in 1985 with Dischord band Rites of Spring, after which he played in One Last Wish and Happy Go Licky.

=== Fugazi ===
Canty was a near-original member of Fugazi as their drummer, replacing original drummer Colin Sears. Canty joined the band in 1987. He recorded and toured with the group until their "indefinite hiatus" in 2003.

Many of Fugazi's songs since Repeater are based on guitar riffs introduced at rehearsals by Canty. An adept multi-instrumentalist, Canty also writes songs on piano (he plays a skeletal version of "Bed for the Scraping" on the Instrument DVD), as well as bass lines for some songs. He is also noted for using a large farmers bell as part of his drum kit.

=== Soundtrack work, film scoring, directing and side projects ===
In 1989, Canty formed the band Girls Against Boys alongside Eli Janney. It was initially a side project for Canty, although he ultimately only appeared on one release by the band (1990's Nineties vs. Eighties) as he turned his focus to Fugazi in 1990.

Canty frequently composes soundtrack music, primarily for documentaries, often with National Geographic and Discovery Channel. He also contributes to or helps produce other Washington D.C.-area recordings. During Fugazi's post-2002 hiatus, Canty took part in a side project, Garland of Hours, with vocalist/cellist/keyboardist Amy Domingues and drummer/percussionist Jerry Busher, both of whom have contributed to Fugazi recordings and performances. Their first self-titled album was released on the Arrest Records label founded by Busher and Canty's younger brother James, formerly of Nation of Ulysses. He currently has a band with Joe Lally of Fugazi called The Messthetics, and has toured with the late Wayne Kramer in his revival of the MC5, MC50.

Canty's score for the Sundance Channel documentary series The Hill premiered on August 23, 2006. Canty was the sole composer on Hard Time, for National Geographic for all four seasons from 2009 to 2012. Also, the composer on two of ESPN's 30 for 30's: Angry Sky, and Birth of Big Air. He scored the film Frank Serpico. He continues to score for film, television, and commercials.

In 2004, Canty and director Christoph Green co-founded the film Production company Trixie to release an ongoing series of music-related films entitled Burn to Shine. The series involves independent alternative music bands from a particular region showing up to perform one song live, without overdubs or corrections, in a house that is about to be demolished. The first volume was filmed in Canty's home region of Washington, D.C., and features performances from Bob Mould, Weird War, Q and Not U, Ted Leo, French Toast, Medications, fellow Fugazi member Ian MacKaye's side project The Evens, and Garland of Hours. A second volume, filmed in the Chicago area, was released in 2005, and a third filmed in Portland, Oregon came out August 20, 2006.

In late 2004 and early 2005, Canty contributed drum tracks to Bob Mould's 2005 solo album, Body of Song. Canty was also the drummer for many dates on the winter 2005/2006 tour in support of the album. Canty returned as the drummer for Bob Mould's District Line, released February 2008. Using the same crew and filming style as on the Burn to Shine series, Canty and Green made a concert film of a Bob Mould show, entitled "Circle of Friends." Canty produced the film and played drums during the show, which took place at Washington D.C.'s 9:30 Club. In 2006, Canty and Green also madeSunken Treasure: Live in the Pacific Northwest, a 2006 Jeff Tweedy (Wilco) tour film, and the Wilco tour film Ashes of American Flags, which was released in 2009 and toured festivals extensively, eventually being broadcast on the Sundance Channel in the US, and being released on DVD and iTunes.

He produced Ted Leo and the Pharmacists's Living With the Living and The Tyranny of Distance albums. He also produced Benjy Ferree, The Thermals's The Body, The Blood, The Machine, and French Toast records, as well as mixing the self-titled debut album for The Aquarium. In 2011, he directed long-time friend Eddie Vedder's new solo performance DVD release, Water on the Road, and took the drums for Vedder's cover of "All Along the Watchtower".

== Influence ==
In 2007, Stylus Magazine ranked Canty at No. 29 on their list of the "50 Greatest Rock Drummers" based on his drumming work with Fugazi. Canty has been cited as an influence by such drummers as Sara Lund of Unwound and multi-instrumentalist Joe Wong.

== Personal life ==
His siblings include musician James Canty and writer Kevin Canty. He lives in Washington, D.C., with his wife and four children.
