= The Evens (album) =

Studio album by the Evens
- Released: March 8, 2005
- Recorded: June 2004
- Studio: Inner Ear Studios
- Genres: Indie rock; folk rock; post-hardcore
- Length: 37:13
- Label: Dischord 150
- Producers: The Evens, Don Zientara

The Evens chronology
The Evens (2005)	Get Evens (2006)

The Evens is the debut album from the Evens, a duo formed by Ian MacKaye on baritone guitar and Amy Farina on drums (both assuming vocal duties). Consisting of songs that the pair had been writing since August 2001, the songs would be performed live several times and even demoed before being recorded at Inner Ear Studios with Don Zientara during the summer of 2004. A reaction against what MacKaye had perceived to be the commercialization of rock music driven by the industry's "idea of youth", the album's "post-post-hardcore" sound is more stripped-down, minimal and personal in comparison to his work with Fugazi. The more direct and politically-charged lyrics, penned by both members, deal mainly with "the loss of community and the struggle to recapture it", though some of them feature romantic themes as well.

Released through Dischord Records in the spring of 2005, the album received positive reviews from a number of different sources. Much of the praise (and criticism) centered around the duo's sound, performances and songwriting, with publications such as Pitchfork and Cokemachineglow considering the album to be an impressive and even "vital" debut.

== Background ==
MacKaye and Farina had known each other for nearly a decade prior to the album's recording – with Farina's band Mr. Candyeater playing frequently with Fugazi and being friends with the band in general. After the break-up of The Warmers, and with many Fugazi members being busy with family life, the two got together and began playing, according to MacKaye, during the "late summer –August [...] – of 2001." After Fugazi went on hiatus, the duo would write for each other and play together "all the way through" till 2003.

The duo first gained attention in late 2003 when they created a video for their original children's song "Vowel Movement", which was made for Pancake Mountain, a Washington, D.C., internet-based children's program. The clip fueled furthered rumors of Fugazi's breakup amid their hiatus, whilst resulting in speculation as to MacKaye's new musical direction. The song itself featured sing-along lines and upbeat music in the vein of Sesame Street and other children's educational programs, while the video showed dancing children and colorful vowels.

Having recorded their demo in December that year, the duo began performing their songs live. However, performing live had resulted in many of the songs changing significantly, hence leading to their decision to re-record the songs 6 months later during the summer of 2004.

== Recording ==
The album ended up being recorded at Inner Ear Studios in Washington, D.C., with the help of "Dischord resident engineer" Don Zientara.

Wanting to emphasize the percusiveness of the music as well as to "fill out" the low-end of the duo's sound owing to a lack of bass, MacKaye chose to use a $250 Danelectro baritone guitar with flat wound strings, calling its sound "really interesting". When asked about the authorship of the material, he stated: "I think it’s safe to say that if there’s a song where one of us is sort of singing by ourselves, chances are fair that the lyrics were written by that person."

== Composition ==
=== Style ===
I’ve felt that in terms of rock ‘n roll, or whatever you want to call it — rock, or punk rock, or hardcore — I kept thinking about the way people devolve. It seemed to me that while it was completely normal to see older guys playing jazz, or blues, and all sorts of music, somewhere in the weirdness of rock ‘n roll, when older people were playing it, either they seemed desperate, or pathetic! [...] You know, it just seemed bizarre to me, but it’s because I felt like, for a lot of the examples I was [seeing], they were people who were thinking about [music] only in terms of a young person’s forum — and I think that has a lot to do with the market, because the market is driven by the idea of youth. And I don’t give a fuck about the market; this is my music.

— Ian MacKaye on his motivations behind the album's musical approach.

The Evens, like much of the duo's work, is more stripped down and minimal than MacKaye's work with Fugazi. Rob Theakston notes that he "provides quiet, contemplative harmonies only hinted at briefly in latter-day Fugazi material" (citing "Pink Frosty" and "I'm So Tired" as points of comparison). Matthew Murphy called the album MacKaye's most "laid-back" and "personal" work till date, noting a "disarming sweetness" in the music brought about by his "particularly appealing" vocal delivery. Many have also noted Amy Farina's "angular" and "wildly inventive" drumming and vocal harmonies, a Tiny Mix Tapes reviewer finding that the former drove most of the songs, especially on tracks such as "Around the Corner". Her vocals, displaying a "strange mix of fragility and strength", have also earned comparisons to "early-90s [...] femme-led indie outfits like Tsunami and Scrawl" as well as Mimi Parker, with her more subdued drumming on tracks such as "Sara Lee" and "Minding One's Business" casting them in "Tortoise-like post-rock hues". MacKaye's baritone guitar playing has been described as being more repetitive, textured, hypnotic and understated in comparison to Farina's drumming.

Overall, the album has been described as "the love child of Things We Lost in the Fire-era Low and One Beat-era Sleater-Kinney", as well as a collection of "likably moody lo-fi sing-alongs". The sound has also been likened to "post-post-hardcore".

=== Themes ===
The politically-charged lyrics deal mainly with "the loss of community and the struggle to recapture it". They have also been called "some of the most straightforward and politically caustic of MacKaye's career, packing a punch equal to some of his most visceral moments in Minor Threat." The personal is political lyrics to the opening track "Shelter Two" explore the minutiae of a new relationship and "crucial, seemingly trivial moments that so often comprise the highlights of our lives" through a "trip to the hardware store". The song features the refrain "It's all downhill from here". "All These Governors" begins with MacKaye proclaiming: "Generally, I don't speak ill of the dead. However, I may make an exception in this case." The song then goes on to launch "a litany of charges against elected officials with the line, "When things should work, but don't work, that's the work of all these governors."" The song "Mt. Pleasant Isn't" references and discusses the 1991 riot of the same name as well as touching upon issues such as gentrification. "Around the Corner"'s lyrics deal with preserving one's youthful beliefs and ideals as one grows older, while songs such as "On the Face of It" and the closing track "You Won't Feel a Thing" offer "vague warnings about capitalism" and tackle "modern-day propaganda ministers" respectively.

== Packaging ==
The cover image of the album depicts a silhouetted elephant in a cage, taken by MacKaye's sister-in-law Lely Constantinople. Of the image's political significance, MacKaye stated: "I think you’ll have to see the whole thing to really get the sense of it. I hadn’t even thought about the more overt, obvious political reference. To me, there’s a whole other level. But I think people will look at it and take what they want; I think it’s a beautiful picture."

== Release ==
Professional ratings
Aggregate scores
Source	Rating
Metacritic	72/100
Review scores
Source	Rating
AllMusic	4/5 stars
Cokemachineglow	76%
Magnet	8/10 stars
NME	8/10
Pitchfork	8.0/10
PopMatters	6/10 stars
Q	3.5/5 stars
Spin	B
Stylus	B+
Tiny Mix Tapes	4.5/5

The album was released through Dischord Records in the spring of 2005, on CD, 12" vinyl and digitally. A free MP3 download of the album came with the (now out-of-stock) vinyl when purchased directly from the label. It was also the first non-Fugazi album released by Ian MacKaye since 1987's Embrace.

=== Reception ===
The album received mostly positive reviews, scoring a 72 out of 100 on Metacritic based on 19 reviews, indicating a "[g]enerally favorable" reception. Tiny Mix Tapes described the songwriting on the album as "excellent" and "remarkably diverse", whilst Rob Theakston of AllMusic called the album a "major leap" forward for both MacKaye and Farina. "Ultimately," writes Matthew Murphy for Pitchfork, "this eponymous debut not only introduces the Evens as a wholly distinct and vital group, but also contains performances that MacKaye would likely have been unable to deliver in any other context."

Despite warning that the listener shouldn't expect any "hair-raising shouts of defiance", Spin commended the album for the "wobbly spirit" shared by the duo. According to Todd Burns, writing for Stylus, the album "sees one side of the Fugazi sound being completely fleshed out and it’s a beautiful thing to hear." Peter Hepburn of Cokemachineglow praised the album as "an impressive debut" and called the MacKaye's "caliber of experimentation [...] more than welcome."

A mixed review came from PopMatters' Evan Rytlewski, who criticized MacKaye's "newfound sense of melody he['d] mastered on The Argument" as being stale without that album's "prevailing dissonance", and found the album's instrumental format more suited to Farina's vocals than MacKaye's.

== Track listing ==
All tracks are written by The Evens.

No.	Title	Length
1.	"Shelter Two"	3:07
2.	"Around the Corner"	3:25
3.	"All These Governors"	3:08
4.	"Crude Bomb"	2:18
5.	"Sara Lee"	4:34
6.	"Mt. Pleasant Isn't"	2:17
7.	"Blessed Not Lucky"	2:58
8.	"If It's Water"	4:14
9.	"Until They're Clear"	1:39
10.	"On the Face of It"	2:15
11.	"Minding One's Business"	4:28
12.	"You Won't Feel a Thing"	2:49
Total length:		37:13

== Personnel ==
According to AllMusic, The Evens themselves are also credited with the cover design, engineering and mixing on this album:

- Ian MacKaye – baritone guitar, vocals, piano (uncredited)
- Amy Farina – drums, vocals

=== Additional credits ===
- Don Zientara – production, engineering, mixing
- Jason Farrell – cover art
- Lely Constantinople – cover photo
