= Three Kings (disambiguation) =

Three Kings refers to the Biblical Magi, also known as the Three Wise Men, appearing in the Gospel of Matthew.

Three Kings may also refer to:

== History ==
- Three Sovereigns and Five Emperors, a group of mythological rulers from ancient China during circa 2852 BC to 2070 BC
  - The Three Kings mentioned in the Three Character Classic and other Classical Chinese texts: Yu the Great, Tang of Shang, and King Wen of Zhou and/or King Wu of Zhou.
- The Three Crowned Kings, of the Sangam period in ancient Tamilakam in the Indian subcontinent
- Era of Three Kings, an era in the history of Estonia from 1561 to 1625/1629 when Estonia was divided between Sweden, Poland–Lithuania and Denmark
- Battle of the Three Kings, also known as the Battle of Alcácer Quibir, a decisive 1578 Moroccan victory over Portugal
- Three Kings (Czech anti-Nazi resistance) (Tři králové in Czech), Czech anti-Nazi group of World War II

== Literature ==
- 3 Kings (book), a 2018 book about hip-hop by Zack O'Malley Greenburg
- Three Kings, a book of three short stories by Chinese writer Ah Cheng
- The Three Kings (novel), a 2010 novel by Alisa Valdes
- 1 Kings, which is known as 3 Kings in some Bible versions
- Fu Lu Shou, personified deities of good fortune, prosperity, and longevity in Chinese Buddhism and Taoism

== Media ==
- The Three Kings (film), a 1929 silent British-German drama film
- The Three Kings (1987 film), a made-for-television film by Mel Damski
- Three Kings (1999 film), an American war film set in post–Gulf War Iraq
- Les Rois mages, a 2001 French film dubbed The Three Kings in English
- Los Reyes Magos (film), a 2003 animated Spanish film
- Three Kings (YuYu Hakusho), the three rulers of the demon plane of Makai in the manga and anime series YuYu Hakusho
- "Three Kings" (Family Guy), a 2009 episode of Family Guy
- Three Kings (2011 film), a Malayalam comedy film
- Three Kings (TV series), a Czech TV series about the resistance organization "Obrana národa" also known as Three Kings

== Music ==
- Three Kings of Blues: Albert King, Freddie King, and B. B. King
- "3 Kings" (song), a 2005 song by Slim Thug, T.I. and Bun B
- "3 Kings", a 2012 song by Rick Ross, Jay-Z and Dr. Dre, from the album God Forgives, I Don't
- The Three Kings, a Christmas carol by Peter Cornelius
- "The Three Kings" (Dove), a carol by Jonathan Dove
- Three Kings (TGT album), 2013
- We Three Kings, a Christmas carol
- Three Kings (Dead Meadow album)
- 3 Kings - aka the Three Blind Mice - a Hot Springs High School jazz band featuring Randy Goodrum and Bill Clinton

== Places ==
- Three Kings, New Zealand is a suburb of Auckland, New Zealand
- A common name for Te Tātua a Riukiuta, a volcano in Auckland, New Zealand
- Three Kings Islands, islands located off the coast of the Northland Region, New Zealand
- Three Wise Men (volcanoes), a series of three small seamounts in the Pacific Ocean

== Other uses ==
- Orion's Belt, an asterism composed of three stars of the Orion constellation

== See also ==
- We Three Kings (disambiguation)
