= Coriky (album) =

Studio album by Coriky
- Released: June 12, 2020 (digital); June 26, 2020 (physical)
- Studio: Inner Ear Studios (Arlington County, Virginia)
- Genres: Indie rock; post-punk; post-rock
- Length: 37:02
- Label: Dischord
- Producer: Don Zientara

Coriky is the debut album of the band Coriky which features Fugazi’s Ian Mackaye and Joe Lally, alongside Amy Farina of the Evens.

The first single, "Clean Kill", was released in February 2020. In May they released "Too Many Husbands".

== Background ==
In 2015, Farina and MacKaye, who played together in The Evens, began playing music with Fugazi and The Messthetics bassist Joe Lally. In 2018, the group played their first show, now with the adopted moniker Coriky, which they'd announced at the bottom of a community bulletin email from Positive Force. During early 2020, Coriky released two songs, "Clean Kill" and "Too Many Husbands" via various free streaming services. Although the self-titled debut album was originally set for release on March 27, 2020, the COVID-19 lockdown enacted in the United States during March, 2020, delayed its release until June 12, 2020, in part to accommodate independent record stores closed due to the pandemic. The band eventually previewed their album at a free show in D.C.'s St. Stephen and the Incarnation Episcopal Church on February 22, 2020.

== Release and reception ==
Professional ratings
Aggregate scores
Source	Rating
AnyDecentMusic?	7.7/10
Metacritic	84/100
Review scores
Source	Rating
AllMusic	4/5 stars
Exclaim!	8/10
The Guardian	4/5 stars
Mojo	4/5 stars
Mondo Sonoro	8/10
OndaRock	7/10
Ox-Fanzine	4/5 stars
Pitchfork	7.8/10
Spectrum Culture	4.0/5

The Guardian's Kitty Empire said "Coriky are as close to the much-missed Fugazi as it gets in 2020" and awarded it four stars. Adam Blyweiss of Treble said that while MacKaye wasn't "nearly the angry young man he once was...The songs on Coriky are as pointed as they are subtle". Stereogum named it "album of the week" and declared it "a triumphant record." On June 18, 2020 Bandcamp named Coriky "Album of the Day".

Laura Jane Grace named it her favorite album of the year, while Nathan Ellis (The Casket Lottery) and The Homeless Gospel Choir included it in their respective top 10s. Nate Newton of Converge named it one of his favorite albums of the year in a Facebook post.

Accolades for Coriky
Publication	Country	Accolade	Rank
Paste	US	The 25 Best Punk Albums of 2020	-
Sound Opinions (Greg Kot)	US	The Best Albums of 2020	7
The Durango Herald	US	Records of 2020	2
Metacritic	US	The Freshman 15: 2020's Best Debut Albums	5
Conan Neutron's Protonic Reversal	US	Top 20 of 2020: Best Records of the Year	8
The Guardian (Kitty Empire)	UK	Kitty Empire's 10 best of 2020	7
Mojo	UK	75 Best Albums of 2020	32
Mondo Sonoro	Spain	The best hardcore/punk albums of 2020 (international)	3

== Track listing ==
All tracks are written by Coriky.

No.	Title	Length
1.	"Clean Kill"	4:12
2.	"Hard to Explain"	3:03
3.	"Say Yes"	2:35
4.	"Have a Cup of Tea"	3:33
5.	"Too Many Husbands"	3:02
6.	"B.Q.M."	1:52
7.	"Last Thing"	3:27
8.	"Jack Says"	2:33
9.	"Shedileebop"	3:36
10.	"Inauguration Day"	3:49
11.	"Woulda Coulda"	5:24
Total length:		37:02

== Personnel ==
Coriky

- Ian MacKaye – guitar, vocals
- Joe Lally – bass, vocals
- Amy Farina – drums, vocals

Additional Musicians

- Jason Farrell – mechanical design

Production

- Don Zientara – engineering, mixing, production
- Coriky – engineering, mixing, artwork, production
- T.J. Lipple – mastering
- Jason Farrell – cover design
- Robert Weston – lacquer cutting
