= I'm So Tired (disambiguation) =

"I'm So Tired" is a 1968 song by the Beatles.

I'm So Tired may also refer to:

- "I'm So Tired...", a 2019 song by Lauv and Troye Sivan
- "I'm So Tired" (Fugazi song), a 1999 song by Fugazi

== See also ==
- So Tired (disambiguation)
