= The Odds (album) =

Studio album by the Evens
- Released: November 20, 2012
- Recorded: Inner Ear Studios
- Genres: Indie rock; post-punk; post-hardcore
- Length: 40:00
- Label: Dischord

The Evens chronology
Get Evens (2006)	The Odds (2012)

Professional ratings
Aggregate scores
Source	Rating
Metacritic	83/100
Review scores
Source	Rating
AllMusic	4/5 stars
Alternative Press	4/5 stars
Blurt	4.5/5 stars
The Boston Phoenix	3.5/4 stars
Erie Reader	4/5 stars
Mojo	4/5 stars
Ox-Fanzine	3/5 stars
Pitchfork	8.0/10
Spin	8/10
Tiny Mix Tapes	3.5/5 stars

The Odds is the third album by indie/punk duo the Evens. It was released on November 20, 2012.

== Reception ==
The Odds has a Metacritic score of 83 based on 14 reviews, indicating "Universal acclaim". Musician and critic John Robb, reviewing the album for the website Louder Than War, compared Farina's "soaring, cutting free voice" to that of Patti Smith, calling the record a "welcome missive from the heartland of idealistic musical culture that stands on its own terms with its musical content [...] a great record that is musically and emotionally powerful and stands out on its own as one of the key releases in this fractured and strange year." Pitchfork's Douglas Wolk praised the album, calling it a "powerful example of aging gracefully [...] The Odds is, in every way, the product of scaling down operations rather than of giving up or throwing the fans a nostalgia trip." However, the review does reserve some criticism for the track "Competing with the Till", on which Wolk describes the duo as sounding like "cranky old folks". The track is also criticized by Jordan Cronk of Cokemachineglow in an otherwise positive review, who describes the song as a "blunt and fairly awkward missive. Like a nervier rendition of Fugazi's “Returning the Screw," the track moves between a sparse narrative outlining the injustices perpetrated on the group by ignorant club owners and a twisting chorus that turns the title phrase into an easy potshot."

Fred Thomas of AllMusic notes that on the album, "The Evens' politics aren't anywhere close to as charged as their Bush-era material, and even the effects of parenthood on their lives are mysterious, save the photo of their silhouetted son that graces the album cover. But much like the skeletal nature of their songs, a lot is conveyed in the empty spaces. Moving through adulthood still committed to the punk struggle, The Odds shows the Evens as more refined and understated than ever." Another positive review came from Liz Pelly of The Boston Phoenix, who wrote that their "third record proves that even the most militant punk songs are often best served by a stripped-down aesthetic. MacKaye has always worked with that sort of ethos, but the Evens are radically minimal — lone baritone guitar and punchy drums bring clarity to fiery post-post-punk minimums and maximums." She praised the song "Wanted Criminals" – "a song framing the fucked-up realities of the prison industrial complex in the context of the recession" – as "a haunting, complex look at economic injustice."

The album was listed 45th on Stereogum's list of their top 50 albums of 2012.

== Track listing ==
All tracks are written by The Evens.

No.	Title	Length
1.	"King of Kings"	2:28
2.	"Wanted Criminals"	3:15
3.	"I Do Myself"	2:52
4.	"Warble Factor"	2:26
5.	"Sooner or Later"	4:42
6.	"Wonder Why"	4:11
7.	"Competing With the Till"	2:36
8.	"Broken Finger"	3:24
9.	"Architects Sleep"	2:43
10.	"Timothy Wright"	4:01
11.	"This Other Thing"	3:00
12.	"Let's Get Well"	2:42
13.	"K.O.K." (Reprise of "King of Kings")	2:13
Total length:		40:33

== Personnel ==
- Ian MacKaye – guitar, vocals, piano (uncredited)
- Amy Farina – drums, vocals
