= There to Here =

Studio album by Joe Lally
- Released: October 10, 2006
- Recorded: Winter/Spring 2006
- Studios: Inner Ear Studios and Dischord House
- Genre: Indie rock
- Length: 41:21
- Label: Dischord
- Producers: Ian Mackaye & Joe Lally

Joe Lally chronology
| There to Here (2006) | Nothing Is Underrated (2007) |

There to Here is the debut album by Fugazi bassist Joe Lally. Released in 2006 on Dischord, the album marks a departure from the post-hardcore sound pioneered by Fugazi, to a more sparse musical style.

== Reception ==
Professional ratings
Review scores
| Source | Rating |
|---|---|
| AllMusic | 3.5/5 stars |
| Pitchfork | 6.4/10 stars |
| Punknews.org | 4.5/5 stars |

In a review for AllMusic, Chris True described the album as "a surprisingly elaborate record, lush and developed," and wrote: "It is a dichotomy of a record: on the one hand it feels almost naked... and on the other it's a nearly-progressive-sounding record, with touches that are dense and layered... Lally presents a record with amazing depth that never panders to the listener."

A writer for The Washington Post stated that the album is "even more musically austere than its credits suggest," and commented: "There to Here doesn't offer many melodic payoffs, emphasizing instead outrage, intensity and groove."

Pitchfork's Jason Crock remarked: "'minimal' doesn't even begin to cover the feel of There to Here. Ascetic is more like it. This is music allergic to anything but Joe Lally's modest, sincere voice, the fluid thumbing of bass strings, and the occasional drum accompaniment."

Vish Khanna of Exclaim! called There to Here "one of the most coherent musical statements of the year," noting that although its "words and music are often spare and bleak... they also contain rich melodies, inventive rhythms, and a sincere mix of hope and despair, all of which easily draw listeners in."

Writing for Punknews.org, Jesse Raub stated: "this is a protest album. Every song has a message... Not only that, but each song is reliant upon repetition and a groove. Easy to sing along, easy to turn into a group effort."

A reviewer for Aquarium Drunkard described the album as "a downbeat ride into the 21st century's socio-anthropological landscape," commenting: "Lyrical subtlety is not, and has never been the name of the game for these guys, so while what coming from someone else might come off as heavy handed seems perfectly natural here."

== Track listing ==
1. "Reason to Believe" - 3:26
2. "The Resigned" - 4:14
3. "Sons and Daughters" - 1:22
4. "Like a Baby" - 1:44
5. "Lidia's Song" - 2:42
6. "Billiards" - 3:16
7. "X-Ray the Lullaby" - 3:28
8. "There to Here" - 4:28
9. "Pick a War" - 3:14
10. "Message from Earth" - 1:28
11. "Factory Warranty" - 3:58
12. "Perforated Line" - 3:34
13. "All Must Pay" - 4:27

== Personnel ==
- Joe Lally – bass, vocals
- Ian MacKaye – guitar, backing vocals
- Guy Picciotto – guitar, recorder
- Amy Farina – drums
- Jerry Busher – drums
- Danny Frankel – drums
- Jason Kourkounis – drums
- Eddie Janney – guitar
- Scott Weinrich – guitar
