= Coriky =

American punk rock band

- Origin: Washington, D.C., United States
- Genres: Indie rock, post rock, post punk
- Years active: 2015–present
- Labels: Dischord
- Spinoff of: Fugazi, The Evens
- Past members: Amy Farina; Ian MacKaye; Joe Lally
- Website: https://dischord.com/band/coriky

Coriky is an American alternative rock band from Washington D.C., formed in 2015. The band is made up of Ian MacKaye (Minor Threat, Fugazi, The Evens), Amy Farina (The Warmers, The Evens), and Joe Lally (Fugazi, The Messthetics). The band's straightforward approach is reflected in the band's bio, which in its entirety read: "Coriky is a band from Washington, D.C. Amy Farina plays drums. Joe Lally plays bass. Ian MacKaye plays guitar. All sing."

== History ==
In 2015, Farina and MacKaye, who played together as The Evens, began playing music with Joe Lally (Fugazi, The Messthetics). In 2018, the group played their first show, now with the adopted moniker Coriky. The band was named after Kuriki, a dice game described as popular amongst touring bands. During early 2020, Coriky released two songs, "Clean Kill" and "Too Many Husbands", via various free streaming services. Although the self-titled debut album was originally set for release on March 27, 2020, the COVID-19 lockdown enacted in the United States during March 2020 delayed its release until June 12, 2020, in part to accommodate independent record stores closed due to the pandemic. The band previewed their album at a free show in D.C.'s St. Stephen and the Incarnation Episcopal Church on February 22, 2020.

Upon release the record was favorably reviewed, and compared and contrasted to MacKaye and Farina's other band The Evens, and to MacKaye and Lally's other band Fugazi.

== Discography ==
- Coriky (2020, Dischord)

=== Singles ===
- "Clean Kill" (2020)
- "Too Many Husbands" (2020)
