= Instrument Soundtrack =

Soundtrack album by Fugazi
- Released: March 23, 1999
- Recorded: September 1989–March 1997
- Studio: Guy's parents' basement (Washington, D.C.); Ian's grandparents' house (Guilford); Pirate House (Washington, D.C.); Dischord House (Arlington); Inner Ear (Arlington)
- Length: 45:37
- Label: Dischord

Fugazi chronology
End Hits (1998)	Instrument Soundtrack (1999)	Furniture (2001)

Instrument Soundtrack is a 1999 (mostly instrumental) soundtrack album by the American post-hardcore band Fugazi. It serves as the score for Jem Cohen's documentary film Instrument (1999), which follows the band.

== Background ==
Instrument Soundtrack is the soundtrack album to Instrument, a 1999 documentary film about Fugazi directed by Jem Cohen. It consists of various instrumental tracks, demo recordings, and "studio outtakes". "I'm So Tired", a piano ballad played and sung by Ian MacKaye, was performed on a piano that "just happened to be" in the recording space where the group was working on Red Medicine (1995).

== Covers ==
"I'm So Tired" has been covered by Fog Lake, Gengahr, Jennylee, Lala Lala, Ultimate Painting, and Eddie Vedder. The song was also covered by Kiki and Herb in their 2016 cabaret show Kiki & Herb: Seeking Asylum! at Joe's Pub. "Slo Crostic" was covered by They Are Gutting a Body of Water on their 2025 studio album Lotto.

== Reception ==
Professional ratings
Review scores
Source	Rating
AllMusic	3/5 stars
The Encyclopedia of Popular Music	2/5 stars
Pitchfork	8.0/10
Punknews.org	5/5 stars
Rolling Stone	2.5/5 stars
Uncut	7/10

Brent DiCrescenzo of Pitchfork gave the album a positive review, describing it as "sound[ing] remarkably playful" and concluding: "For all those who worry that the Fugazi story may be coming to an end, both Instrument and its soundtrack show a band still growing and, in some ways, just getting started." Amy Sciarretto of CMJ New Music Report wrote: "Collecting 18 surprisingly ambient, previously unreleased Fugazi demos and practice tapes, [...] Instrument is Fugazi's most focused attempt at mellowness and subtlety." The New Rolling Stone Album Guide called the album "mostly ragged and unformed, but for confirmed Fugaziphiles, it's a solidly interesting peek into the band's creative process."

MacKaye later said of the album:

Instrument is sort of my favorite record, because those were recorded for us. So none of it was for public consumption. So when you listen back, it's just us practicing, us playing together, and it just sounds relaxed.

== Track listing ==
All tracks are written by Fugazi.

No.	Title	Lead vocals	Length
1.	"Pink Frosty" (Demo)		3:47
2.	"Lusty Scripps"		3:42
3.	"Arpeggiator" (Demo)		2:54
4.	"Afterthought"		1:28
5.	"Trio's"		2:15
6.	"Turkish Disco"		2:34
7.	"Me and Thumbelina"	MacKaye	0:45
8.	"Floating Boy" (Demo)		3:35
9.	"Link Track"		1:26
10.	"Little Debbie"	MacKaye	1:49
11.	"H.B."		1:19
12.	"I'm So Tired"	MacKaye	1:59
13.	"Rend It" (Demo)	Picciotto	3:32
14.	"Closed Captioned" (Demo)		5:50
15.	"Guilford Fall" (Demo)		3:29
16.	"Swingset"		1:37
17.	"Shaken All Over"		0:58
18.	"Slo Crostic"		2:41
Total length:			45:37

=== Notes ===
- "Pink Frosty Demo", "Arpeggiator Demo", "Floating Boy Demo", "Closed Captioned Demo", and "Guilford Fall Demo" are demo recordings of tracks originally featured on the band's 1998 album End Hits.
- "Rend It Demo" is a demo recording of "Rend It", which was originally featured on the band's 1993 album In on the Kill Taker.
- "Slo Crostic" is a slowed down version of "Caustic Acrostic", which was originally featured on the band's 1998 album End Hits.

== Personnel ==
Credits adapted from the album's liner notes.

=== Fugazi ===
- Brendan Canty – engineering (1–5, 7, 8, 10, 12, 14, 15, 18), drums (1–4, 6–12, 14–16, 18), mixing (2–4, 6, 7, 9–12, 14, 16, 17); guitar, bass (3, 14); melodica (5), vocals (17), graphic concept
- Joe Lally – bass (1, 2, 4–6, 8–10, 15, 16, 18), engineering (1, 2, 5, 7, 8, 10, 12, 15, 18), mixing (2, 4, 6, 9, 10, 16, 17), graphic concept
- Ian MacKaye – guitar (1, 2, 5, 6, 8–10, 15–18), engineering (1, 2, 5, 7, 8, 10, 12, 15, 18), mixing (2, 4, 6, 9, 10, 12, 16, 17), keyboards (4), vocals (7, 10, 12, 17), bass (11), piano (12), graphic concept
- Guy Picciotto – mixing (1–6, 8–10, 13, 14, 16–18), engineering (1–5, 7, 8, 10, 12, 14, 15, 18), guitar (1, 3, 6, 8, 10, 13–16, 18), clarinet (2, 7), drum machine bass drum (3), vocals (13, 17); bass, dehumidifier percussion (13); thumb piano (17), graphic concept, insert stills

=== Additional contributors ===
- Don Zientara – engineering (9, 17), mixing (9)
- Jem Cohen – cover stills
- Jason Farrell – cover help
