= Three Kings (Dead Meadow album) =

2010 live album by Dead Meadow

Live album by Dead Meadow
- Released: 23 March 2010
- Genre: Psychedelic rock, stoner rock, indie rock
- Length: 70:00 / 90:41
- Label: Xemu Records
- Producer: Steve Kille

Dead Meadow chronology
Old Growth (2008)	Three Kings (2010)	Warble Womb (2010)

Professional ratings
Review scores
Source	Rating
Allmusic	3.5/5 stars
musicOMH	3.5/5 stars
Pitchfork	6.7/10 stars
Tiny Mix Tapes	2/5 stars

Three Kings is a combination album and film by the psychedelic rock trio Dead Meadow, first released in 2010 by Xemu Records as a CD/DVD set. The album features live tracks recorded during a hometown gig at the conclusion of a five-month tour in support of previous album Old Growth, accompanied by five new interspersed studio tracks. The film strings together clips of concert performances with surreal and psychedelic scenes.

There are two versions of the album: the original 14-track release, and an expanded digital-only edition that includes additional live tracks and an alternate track order. Both versions contain the album's five new studio tracks.

== Film ==
The film's premise consists of three mystics "kings" who are swept into an alternate reality where they are tempted by various dark sides of humanity, with different reactions from each. This is coupled with various psychedelic scenes, usually paired with the more upbeat, jammier, songs. There is no specific theme to these scenes. One example consists of bipedal "weed-creatures" self-igniting, with the resulting smoke inhaled by the moon. Locations used include the Tatooine set from within Star Wars and residences from Diamonds Are Forever.

== Track listing ==
Expanded Edition
No.	Title	Length
1.	"Til Kingdom Come" (Live)	4:11
2.	"Between Me and the Ground" (Live)	3:15
3.	"Good Moanin'" (Live)	4:33
4.	"At Her Open Door" (Live)	6:26
5.	"The Whirlings" (Live)	4:01
6.	"That Old Temple"	4:57
7.	"To the One"	5:32
8.	"The Narrows"	7:50
9.	"Push 'em to the Crux"	3:29
10.	"Seven Seers" (Live)	4:53
11.	"Greensky Greenlake" (Live)	6:00
12.	"Beyond the Fields We Know" (Live)	9:29
13.	"Everything's Going On" (Live)	5:28
14.	"Lady" (Live)	5:20
15.	"Darlin'"	5:11
16.	"Queen of All Returns" (Live)	5:46
17.	"What Needs Must Be" (Live - Bonus Track)	4:20
Total length:		1:30:00

== Critical reception ==
Reviews of Three Kings varied between slightly and generally positive on both the music and the accompanying DVD.

AllMusic felt the music, including the newer songs, were good but not notably enhanced by their live performance as opposed to their standard studio albums, which are already played in a "loose and live fashion". However, the DVD was described as an "engaging visual experience".

Exclaim! gave a positive report on the live music, describing it as spectacular and akin to a Jimi Hendrix jam session, although functionally mute on the visual aspect of the release.

Pitchfork's review was more mixed, both towards the live-music release and the visuals DVD. The live-performance nature was not felt to add anything, indeed, to reduce the urgency of the otherwise high quality music. The DVD was alternatively described as bizarre, humorous and as having some potential parallels to Dead Meadow's own music.

== Personnel ==
Per album liner notes.

Dead Meadow

- Jason Simon – guitars, vocals
- Steve Kille – bass, producer, recording engineer
- Stephen McCarty – drums, card designs

Additional personnel

- Miranda Lee Richards – additional vocals on "Push 'Em to the Crux"
- Dave Schiffman – mixer
- Howie Weinberg – mastering
- Aaron Giesel – cover photo
