= Feathers (Dead Meadow album) =

Studio album by Dead Meadow
- Released: February 22, 2005
- Recorded: July – September 2004 at LoHo Studios, NYC and Pirate House, Washington DC.
- Genre: Psychedelic rock, stoner rock
- Length: 43:11 / 56:54
- Label: Matador Records
- Producer: Bob Ebeling and Steve Kille

Dead Meadow chronology
Shivering King and Others (2003)	Feathers (2005)	Old Growth (2008)

Professional ratings
Review scores
Source	Rating
Allmusic	3.5/5 stars
Pitchfork Media	(8.0/10)

Feathers is the fourth studio album by American psychedelic rock band Dead Meadow, released in 2005 by Matador Records on CD and LP. The band is joined on the album by additional guitar player Cory Shane.

Pitchfork praised the record and the band's ability to "venture further outside their 60s influences to create a spacious, hypnotic album that distinguishes them from their stoner- and psych-rock contemporaries."

In 2019 the album was reissued on CD and LP by Tekeli-li Records, and accompanied by a bonus CD featuring alternate takes, unreleased tracks and instrumental demos.

== Track listing ==
1. "Let's Jump In" – 4:19
2. "Such Hawks Such Hounds" – 3:19
3. "Get Up on Down" – 5:27
4. "Heaven" – 6:05
5. "At Her Open Door" – 5:31
6. "Eyeless Gaze All Eye/Don't Tell the Riverman" – 7:04
7. "Stacy's Song" – 4:05
8. "Let It All Pass" – 5:20
9. "Through the Gates of the Sleepy Silver Door" – 2:01

Bonus Track (CD and Digital):

10. "Sleepy Silver Door (Extended)" – 13:44

Notes:

- Track 10 (unlisted CD-only bonus track, often labeled "Untitled") is a re-recorded and extended version of "Sleepy Silver Door" from Dead Meadow's self-titled first album.

== Personnel ==
- Jason Simon – Guitar, Vocals
- Cory Shane – Guitar, Vocals
- Steve Kille – Bass, Sitar
- Stephen McCarty – Drums
