= Baron Grod =

- Origin: Austin, Texas, U.S.
- Genres: Post-metal, experimental rock, post-rock
- Years active: 2007–2011
- Past members: Lance Schibi; Ryoko Minowa; David Finner; Cody Schibi

Baron Grod was an American four-piece post-metal/experimental rock band from Austin, Texas, United States. The band was made up of Lance Schibi, Ryoko Minowa, David Finner and Cody Schibi. Tagged as atmospheric and Pink Floyd in drop D, they were known for their fluent, seamless live shows and shared bills with the oft-compared Russian Circles, This Will Destroy You, Stinking Lizaveta and Giant Squid.

== History ==
Formed in late 2007 by guitarist David Finner (formerly of the short-lived Austin band, Cardinale), bassist Lance Schibi and drummer Cody Schibi (identical twin brothers), the three quickly recruited keyboardist Ryoko Minowa to complete the lineup.

They recorded their self-titled debut album in 2008 which was self-released the fall of 2008. The band was quickly recognized at the 2008-09 Austin Music Awards having been voted Top 10 in the Best Metal, Experimental and Instrumental categories. Baron Grod was again included in these categories in the 2009-10 Music Awards, this year making the Top 5 band in each category.

Baron Grod disbanded in late 2011.

== Live sound ==
Live, the band tended to merge individual songs into a seamless, cohesive piece. Although band members engaged in crowd banter and vocals, they typically introduced the songs with instruments, feedback or silence. Predominantly an instrumental band, Baron Grod were known to insert distorted screams and vocal melodies at certain points.

== Discography ==
Studio albums

- Baron Grod (2008)
