= Make Him Look Good =

2006 novel by Alisa Valdes-Rodriguez

- Author: Alisa Valdes-Rodriguez
- Language: English
- Genre: Chica Lit
- Publisher: St. Martin’s Press
- Publication date: 2006
- Publication place: U.S.A.
- Pages: 376
- ISBN: 0-312-34966-1

Make Him Look Good is a 2006 novel by Alisa Valdes-Rodriguez. Much like her pioneering work The Dirty Girls Social Club, Make Him Look Good falls under the category of Chica lit and explores the p.o.v. of several Latina women as they seek success in their personal and professional lives.

== Summary ==
The novel revolves loosely around Ricky Biscayne, a Miami based Latin pop-star who is on the verge of releasing his English-language cross-over album, and the women and men whose lives are connected to him.

Milan Gotay, a 24-year-old laxative publicist and obsessive Ricky fan, forces her mother and sister to watch him perform on The Tonight Show prompting her successful older sister, Geneva, to pursue him as a sponsor for her new nightclub. The same performance causes Jill Sanchez, a famous singer and actress, to decide to dump her fiancé and re-establish her relationship with Ricky, despite the fact that he is newly married to a Serbian model, Jasminka. The performance also triggers Ricky, energized by his success to finally agree to impregnate Jasminka who is desperate to start a family to help her get over her eating disorder and the loss of her own family who were murdered in the Croatian War of Independence. Matthew Baker, Ricky's producer and friend who is responsible for writing and performing most of Ricky’s songs also watches the performance and is conflicted over Ricky's rising fame.

During Geneva’s meeting with Ricky she realizes that he is being poorly managed and has him immediately sign a deal with her. She also suggests that he hire Milan after she learns his current publicist is going to jail. Ricky does hire Milan and decides to seduce her, especially when he realizes that his friend Matthew is infatuated with her. He tells Milan that he and his wife Jasminka have a sham marriage when in reality they are growing apart because she is gaining weight due to her pregnancy and the fact that his addiction to cocaine is making him increasingly paranoid and violent.

As Ricky becomes more famous he draws the attention of Sophia, the 13-year-old daughter of single-mother Irene Gallagher. Irene, who works as a fire-fighter in a hostile work environment and struggles with money, tries to deny that Ricky is Sophia’s father, but Sophia convinced of her resemblance to the man, manages to sneak into his private compound where Jasminka lets her into the house. Ricky denies he is her father and, when Sophia talks to the press, convinces Milan to destroy both Irene and her daughter by portraying them as poor, money-hungry gold diggers who are desperate to steal his money.

Jasminka goes to Ricky’s mother Alma who reveals that Irene and Ricky were childhood sweethearts and the child is his. Matthew also tells Jasminka that he is responsible for nearly the entirety of Ricky’s discography prompting her to leave him. He also tries to tell the same thing to Milan who thinks he is lying until she walks in on a recording session and realizes that he was telling the truth about singing and writing Ricky’s songs.

At the opening night of Club G, Milan’s new club, Jill and Ricky perform terribly using their live vocals. Geneva and Milan also reveal to the journalists at Club G that Ricky is Sophia’s biological father after having a DNA test done to prove it. They decide to rename the club Club Sophia and follow up this revelation with a performance by Matt where he reveals he is the true artist behind Ricky’s image.

In the aftermath Jasminka, Sophia and Alma grow close allowing Jasminka to finally have the family she’s longed for since her own was murdered. Irene’s image, now rebuilt by the fact that Ricky is Sophia’s father, is able to settle with her fire-department for sexual-discrimination and is offered a new job at a fire department with a woman chief. Milan struggles to manage Matthew’s career while working for her sister Geneva whom she has finally grown close to. Jill and Ricky, finally having left their partners to be with one another rebuild their careers with Jill advising Ricky to come clean about his drug addiction and past behaviour and claim he has found God. After Jasminka gives birth and invites everyone to celebrate her daughter with her at the hospital they see Ricky giving an interview claiming to have found Jesus and announcing plans for a country music album.

The novel ends with Milan and Geneva on their way to their parents’ house to introduce them to their respective boyfriends whom they are sure their parents will disapprove of. They nevertheless promise to support one another.

== Characters ==
- Milan Gotay a 24-year-old publicist who still lives at home and is obsessed with Ricky Biscane. She has a difficult relationship with her sister Geneva as several of her past boyfriends have left Milan for her glamorous older sister.
- Geneva Gotay Milan’s successful older sister who is trying to launch her own club, Club G.
- Jasminka Ricky’s 26-year-old Serbian wife who has been a successful model for ten years. After her entire family was murdered she was scouted from a refuge camp by a modelling agency and developed an eating disorder and began cutting herself.
- Jill Sanchez A 38-year-old singer-actress with her own successful perfume line who had a former fling with Ricky and wants to reunite with him despite the fact that she is engaged to another man.
- Matthew Baker a 25-year-old short, bald, red-headed musician who writes and performs Ricky’s songs. He also writes songs for Jill.
- Irene Gallagher a 28-year-old firefighter and single mom who is raising her daughter by Ricky from when they were 14 years old.
- Sophia Gallagher is Irene’s 13-year-old daughter who believes that her father will immediately love and accept her when she goes to see him.
- 'Ricky Biscane’ a 28-year-old Latin pop-singer born Ricardo Batista whose behaviour grows more erratic and violent the more famous he gets.
