= Nothing Is Underrated =

Studio album by Joe Lally
- Released: November 20, 2007
- Recorded: Summer 2007
- Studios: Dischord House and Inner Ear Studios
- Genre: Indie rock
- Length: 36:36
- Label: Dischord
- Producers: Ian Mackaye & Guy Picciotto

Joe Lally chronology
There to Here (2006)	Nothing Is Underrated (2007)	Why Should I Get Used to It (2011)

Nothing Is Underrated is the second solo album by Fugazi bassist Joe Lally. As the follow-up to Lally's debut, There to Here, it is stylistically similar in its woody, bass-oriented grooves. Much like its predecessor, Nothing Is Underrated features various members of Washington D.C. groups such as Faraquet, the Capitol City Dusters, Medications, The Out Circuit, the Delta 72, Capillary Action, Rites of Spring, and Lally's bandmates in Fugazi.

== Reception ==
Professional ratings
Review scores
Source	Rating
AllMusic	3.5/5 stars
Alternative Press	3/5 stars
Drowned in Sound	5/10 stars
Pitchfork	6.2/10 stars

In a review for AllMusic, Chris True wrote: "While There to Here was a slightly jarring affair, best described as an artist suddenly out on his own and finding his feet, Nothing Is Underrated is Lally a bit more comfortable... [it] is a fine record that shows, without a doubt, that Lally is continuing to grow as an artist on his own."

Pitchfork's Tom Breihan commented: "The main problem here, if it's a problem at all, is that Nothing Is Underrated never sounds anything less than pleasant, which means it always sounds polite... the sense of near-messianic purpose that drove Fugazi is missed... [it] is an easy record to like but a hard one to love."

Vish Khanna of Exclaim! noted that "the record is equally monotonous and, despite Lally's dynamic talents, surprisingly flat at times... Nothing is Underrated is certainly challenging but not in the manner expected of Joe Lally."

Writing for Magnet, Jason Ferguson stated that, in relation to its predecessor, the album is "much warmer and more accessible." He remarked: "Whether it's because the lyrics are of a more personal/poetic bent or because there are more guests... dropping by to add their musical science to the proceedings, Nothing Is Underrated comes off like a simmering piece of 21st-century blues."

In an article for Drowned in Sound, Sam Lewis noted that, "considering the Fugazi connection will be forever pinned to Lally, it's impressive that, having gone solo, he's been able to create something of an original voice." He called Lally's playing "impressive, tight and hypnotic," but stated that "there just isn't enough going on in Nothing Is Underrated to make it worthy of recommendation."

Casey Boland of Alternative Press commented: "Lally still creates music as challenging and rewarding as his former band... Nothing Is Underrated perseveres with confident performances and a cohesion" that There to Here lacked.

== Track listing ==
1. "Day Is Born" - 2:29
2. "Scavenger's Garden" - 3:21
3. "Map of the World" - 3:28
4. "Tonight at Ten" - 2:33
5. "Via Nomentana" - 2:40
6. "Motora" - 2:24
7. "Skin and Bone" - 3:14
8. "Pieces of String" - 2:53
9. "Door Closing" - 2:51
10. "The Space Program" - 3:03
11. "Mistaken Identity" - 2:45
12. "Painfully Aware" - 2:35
13. "Strascinata" - 2:20

== Personnel ==
- Joe Lally – bass, vocals
- Ian MacKaye – guitar
- Guy Picciotto – guitar
- Devin Ocampo – drums
- Ricardo Lagomasino – drums
- Sam Krulewitch – keyboards
- Jason Kourkounis – drums
- Eddie Janney – guitar
- Andy Gale – drums
