= Got Live If You Want It =

2002 live album by Dead Meadow

Live album by Dead Meadow
- Released: September 17, 2002
- Recorded: February 17, 2002
- Genre: Psychedelic rock, stoner rock
- Length: 47:58
- Label: The Committee to Keep Music Evil

Dead Meadow chronology
Howls from the Hills (2001)	Got Live If You Want It (2002)	Shivering King and Others (2003)

Professional ratings
Review scores
Source	Rating
AllMusic	4/5 stars

Got Live If You Want It is a live album by American band Dead Meadow. It was recorded live at Maxwell's Hoboken, New Jersey, on February 17, 2002, and released seven months later on CD and orange vinyl LP by Anton Newcombe's label, The Committee to Keep Music Evil.

== Track listing ==
1. "Green Sky Green Lake" – 5:42
2. "Everything's Goin On" – 3:15
3. "Good Moanin'" – 4:47
4. "Sleepy Silver Door" – 7:29
5. "Beyond the Fields We Know" – 9:26
6. "Dusty Nothing" – 4:06
7. "Lady" – 4:46
8. "Rocky Mountain High" – 7:27

== Critical reception ==
AllMusic gave a positive review of the mix of sludge and drift. There was a notable difference between the usual studio-recording style and the live style used for the album. The reviewer summarised it as "trippy in the best sense of the word, as Simon's vocals cascade over the band's full shuffling downward slide". Exclaim!'s review was mixed, though positive, noting the vocals of the psych-rock would either be loved or hated by listeners, though the general quality was appreciated.
