= Anthropocosmic Nest =

Studio album by the Messthetics
- Released: September 6, 2019
- Genres: Experimental rock, progressive rock, art punk, jazz fusion, post-hardcore
- Length: 37:00
- Label: Dischord Records

The Messthetics chronology
The Messthetics (2018)	Anthropocosmic Nest (2019)	The Messthetics and James Brandon Lewis (2024)

Anthropocosmic Nest is the second album by the Messthetics. Unlike their debut album, which was recorded after having only been together for a short while, this album was recorded after a great deal of touring. Guitarist Anthony Pirog estimates the band played about 200 gigs and therefore had a chance to perform the songs live for a while before recording them.

== Reception ==
Professional ratings
Review scores
Source	Rating
AllMusic	4/5 stars
Exclaim!	9/10 stars
Spectrum Culture	3.5/5 stars

In a review for AllMusic, Mark Deming called the album "a must for anyone with a taste for music that's smart, challenging, and exciting," and wrote: "Anthropocosmic Nest pushes the trio's boundaries on all sides... The three musicians... [have] created a greater shared language and the conversation is richer, more potent, and more deeply rewarding" in comparison with their debut album.

Justin Cober-Lake of Spectrum Culture stated that, although the album "runs just a touch too long," it "finds new ways to blend a hard rock rhythm with more outre approaches to jazz guitar." He commented: "With Anthropocosmic Nest, the group solidifies who they are. While each members' past remains a considerable part of the trio's context, the Messthetics are becoming an entity distinctly their own."

Exclaim!'s Vish Khanna noted that, on the album, the musicians outdid their debut "simply by getting to know each other a lot better." He described the recording as "dynamic, revealing a patient, thoughtful approach to songwriting, which, beyond exhibiting the band's musical proficiency, is a real signifier of genuine friendship and trust."

Writing for Dusted, Jennifer Kelly remarked: "All three musicians play very well, and they've obviously gotten more intuitive and engaged with one another. But it's too much skill and too little viscera for my taste."

A writer for PBS 106.7FM stated that the album "perfectly captures the trio's current live dynamic, complete with improvisational tangents, playful experimentation, and cathartic sprawl."

Caleb R. Newton of New Noise Magazine called the album "a captivating musical adventure" and "a gripping little glimpse of a new universe to be explored," featuring "wild rhythms that are sometimes jazzy and sometimes noisy," with "pieces [that] consistently come together with a stunningly smooth power."

The album was featured in Bandcamp's "The Best Punk on Bandcamp" for September 2019.

== Track listing ==
1. "Better Wings" – 5:03
2. "Drop Foot" – 3:47
3. "Section 9" – 3:09
4. "Scrawler" – 2:39
5. "The Assignment" – 0:42
6. "Pay Dust" – 2:27
7. "Pacifica" – 3:43
8. "Because the Mountain Says So" – 4:48
9. "Insect Conference" – 1:36
10. "La Lontra" – 2:46
11. "Touch Earth Touch Sky" – 6:17

== Personnel ==
- Joe Lally - Bass
- Brendan Canty - Drums
- Anthony Pirog - Guitar
