= James Brandon Lewis =

American jazz musician

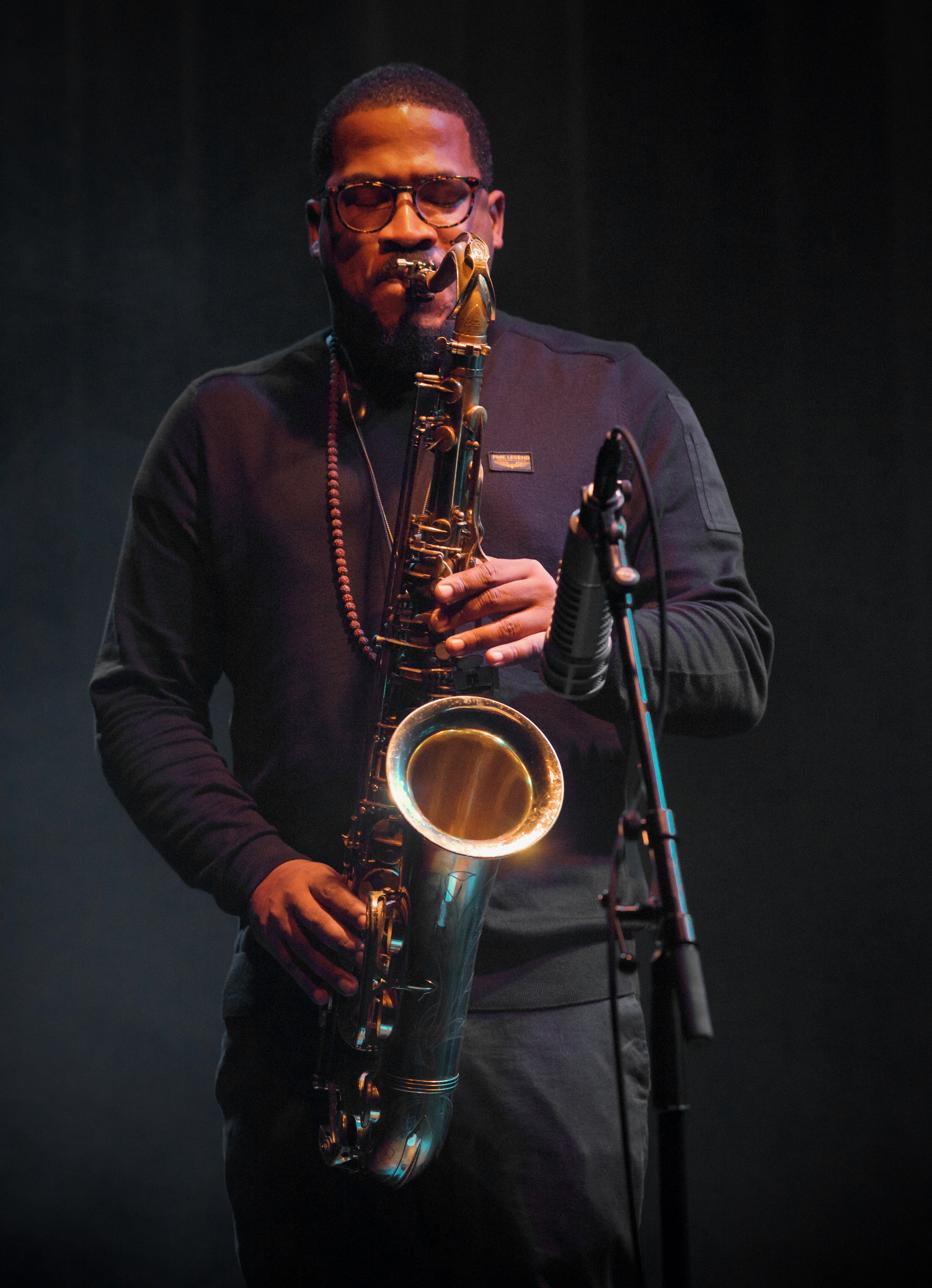

James Brandon Lewis (August 13, 1983 in Buffalo, New York) is an American jazz composer and saxophonist.

== Life ==
Lewis graduated from Howard University in 2006, after which he focused on gospel music. He received his MFA in 2010 from the California Institute of the Arts. During his graduate training, he studied the work of music theorist Joseph Schillinger. In 2012, he relocated to New York City and switched to jazz, releasing his first album Divine Travels in 2014. This album was followed by nine more albums, including Jesup Wagon, which was selected as Album of the Year by DownBeat critics in 2022. He graduated with a PhD in Creativity from the Rowan University in Philadelphia in 2025.

== Discography ==
- Moments (2010)
- Divine Travels (2014)
- Days of FreeMan (2015)
- No Filter (2016)
- Radiant Imprints (2018, with Chad Taylor)
- An Unruly Manifesto (2019)
- Live in Willisau (2020, with Chad Taylor; Intakt)
- Molecular (2020, with Aruan Ortiz, Chad Taylor, and Brad Jones; Intakt)
- Jesup Wagon (2021, with Red Lily Quintet; TAO Forms)
- Code of Being (2021, with Aruan Ortiz, Chad Taylor, and Brad Jones; Intakt)
- MSM Molecular Systematic Music - Live (2022, with Aruan Ortiz, Chad Taylor, and Brad Jones; Intakt)
- Eye of I (2023, with Chirs Hoffman and Max Jaffe; Anti-)
- For Mahalia, with Love (2023, with Red Lily Quintet; Tao Forms)
- Transfiguration (2024, with Aruan Ortiz, Chad Taylor, and Brad Jones; Intakt)
- The Messthetics and James Brandon Lewis (2024, with The Messthetics; Impulse! Records)
- Apple Cores (2025, with Josh Werner and Chad Taylor; Anti-)
- Abstraction Is Deliverance (2025, with Aruan Ortiz, Chad Taylor, and Brad Jones; Intakt)
- Deface the Currency (2026, with The Messthetics; Impulse! Records)
- Omni (2026, with Aruan Ortiz, Chad Taylor, and Brad Jones; Intakt)
- Calling Antonin (2026, with Red Lily quintet, Kirk Knuffke, Melanie Dyer, Tomeka Reid, Joshua Abrams, and Chad Taylor; TAO Forms)
