= The Messthetics and James Brandon Lewis =

Studio album by the Messthetics and James Brandon Lewis
- Released: March 15, 2024
- Studios: Tonal Park; Washington, D. C., US
- Genres: Free improvisation; jazz fusion
- Length: 46:17
- Label: Impulse!
- Producers: Don Godwin; James Brandon Lewis; the Messthetics

James Brandon Lewis chronology
Transfiguration (2024)	The Messthetics and James Brandon Lewis (2024)	Apple Cores (2025)

the Messthetics chronology
Anthropocosmic Nest (2019)	The Messthetics and James Brandon Lewis (2024)

“The way I revere them is the same way that I revere playing with Jamaaladeen Tacuma or playing with William Parker. It’s a certain road experience that you can’t get in school.” He also appreciates that he can hear the rich musical heritage of their hometown in their sound. “It’s like a well-oiled machine playing with them.”

— James Brandon Lewis on performing with The Messthetics

The Messthetics and James Brandon Lewis is a collaborative studio album by American jazz fusion group the Messthetics and saxophonist James Brandon Lewis, released on March 15, 2024, through Impulse! Records. It has received positive reviews from critics.

== Reception ==
In Glide Magazine, Jim Hynes wrote that this music "the intersection of free improvisation and the spirit of punk-infused rock n’ roll" and continued that "the album succeeds even more so by the shifting sonics that give way to melodies and infectious hooks". In Spin, Reed Jackson scored this release an A−, characterizing the collaboration as "volatile chemistry" that results in the rhythm section sounding more like their prior band Fugazi. Editors at Stereogum chose this as Album of the Week, where reviewer Chris DeVille wrote that the music "often operates within a jazz tradition" but also displays the musicians' other influences and this allowed him as a non-jazz critic to appreciate the songs; he ended his piece speculating that it "might just guide you somewhere new and exciting too". A feature in The Washington Post by Chris Kelly states that "Lewis’s saxophone adds a bold voice to what the trio has done previously" and notes that "the album was written and laid out to leave room for [guitarist Anthony] Pirog and Lewis to toy with melodies, trade solos and play together".

== Track listing ==
1. "L'Orso" – 4:40
2. "Emergence" – 2:59
3. "That Thang" – 3:11
4. "Three Sisters" – 5:16
5. "Boatly" – 7:27
6. "The Time Is the Place" – 5:59
7. "Railroad Tracks Home" – 7:15
8. "Asthenia" – 2:33
9. "Fourth Wall" – 6:56

== Personnel ==
- James Brandon Lewis – saxophone, production

The Messthetics

- Brendan Canty – drums, production
- Joe Lally – bass, production
- Anthony Pirog – guitar, production

Additional personnel

- David Avidan – inner sleeve photography
- Don Godwin – mastering, production
- David LaMason – back cover photography
- Charlie Pilzer – mastering
- David Willingham – cover photography

== See also ==
- 2024 in American music
- 2024 in jazz
- List of 2024 albums
