= Baron Grod (album) =

Studio album by Baron Grod
- Released: October 1, 2008
- Recorded: April 2008 at Jacketweather Studios in Austin, Texas
- Genre: Post-rock; Post-metal; Experimental Music
- Length: 36:34

Professional ratings
Review scores
Source	Rating
Austin Chronicle	Review link

Baron Grod is the first [self-]released album by Austin, TX band, Baron Grod. It was released on October 1, 2008.

== Track listing ==
No.	Title	Length
1.	"Inter"	3:19
2.	"Whitechapel"	11:00
3.	"With the Look of a Gentleman"	7:33
4.	"Thousand Year Lament"	11:13
5.	"Ederlezi"	3:21
Total length:		36:34

== Personnel ==
- Ryoko Minowa - keyboards, vocals
- Cody Schibi − drums
- David Finner − guitar, vocals
- Lance Schibi - bass, vocals
- Cody Schibi & Lance Schibi − album design
