= The Nothing They Need =

Studio album by Dead Meadow
- Released: March 2, 2018
- Genre: Psychedelic rock, stoner rock
- Length: 41:49
- Label: Xemu

Dead Meadow chronology
Warble Womb (2013)	The Nothing They Need (2018)

Professional ratings
Aggregate scores
Source	Rating
Metacritic	74/100
Review scores
Source	Rating
AllMusic	3.5/5 stars
The Line of Best Fit	7/10
MusicOMH	3.5/5 stars

The Nothing They Need is the seventh studio album by American psychedelic rock band Dead Meadow. It was released on March 2, 2018, under Xemu Records.

The CD release of the album includes, as a hidden bonus track, Dead Meadow's cover of The Beatles song "Tomorrow Never Knows," which was released digitally in 2022.

== Critical reception ==
The Nothing They Need was met with generally favorable reviews from critics. At Metacritic, which assigns a weighted average rating out of 100 to reviews from mainstream publications, this release received an average score of 74, based on 6 reviews.

== Track listing ==
The Nothing They Need track listing
No.	Title	Length
1.	"Keep Your Head"	6:22
2.	"Here with the Hawk"	2:55
3.	"I'm so Glad"	4:51
4.	"Nobody Home"	6:17
5.	"This Shaky Hand is Not Mine"	5:21
6.	"Rest Natural"	2:21
7.	"The Light"	7:59
8.	"Unsettled Dust"	5:43

CD-Only Bonus Track
No.	Title	Length
9.	"Tomorrow Never Knows"	4:47
