= Juan Luis Carrera =

Juan Luis Carrera is a former musician turned musician manager.

As a musician, Carrera was the bassist for the Dischord Records band The Warmers and has also played with bands like Lungfish, Lois, Junk Man Ran, and The Junction.

His management company is Ravenhouse Management.

== Sources ==
- Ravenhouse Management Official Site
- Dischord Records Official Site
- Interview With Utopia Online Magazine
- Bright Eyes frontman taking care of business
