= Apple Cores =

Studio album by James Brandon Lewis
- Released: February 7, 2025
- Length: 42:03
- Label: Anti-

James Brandon Lewis chronology
| The Messthetics and James Brandon Lewis (2024) | Apple Cores (2025) |

Apple Cores is the sixteenth studio album by American jazz musician James Brandon Lewis. It was released on February 7, 2025, by Anti-.

== Background ==
On November 19, 2024, Lewis announced the release of his new album, along single "Five Spots to Caravan".

=== Singles ===
"Five Spot to Caravan", the first single off the album, is a reference to the Five Spot Café in New York and the Caravan of Dreams in Fort Worth Texas, with both locations honoring American jazz musician Ornette Coleman.

The second single "Prince Eugene", was released on January 9, 2025.

== Critical reception ==
Professional ratings
Aggregate scores
| Source | Rating |
|---|---|
| Metacritic | 84/100 |
Review scores
| Source | Rating |
| AllMusic | 4/5 stars |

Apple Cores was met with "universal acclaim" reviews from critics. At Metacritic, which assigns a weighted average rating out of 100 to reviews from mainstream publications, this release received an average score of 84, based on 6 reviews.

== Track listing ==
Apple Cores track listing
| No. | Title | Writer(s) | Length |
|---|---|---|---|
| 1. | "Apple Cores No. 1" | James Brandon Lewis; Chad Taylor; Josh Werner | 2:53 |
| 2. | "Prince Eugene" | Lewis; Taylor; Werner | 4:54 |
| 3. | "Five Spots to Caravan" | Lewis; Taylor; Werner | 4:20 |
| 4. | "Of Mind and Feeling" | Lewis; Taylor; Werner | 2:43 |
| 5. | "Apple Cores No. 2" | Lewis; Taylor; Werner | 3:39 |
| 6. | "Remember Brooklyn & Moki" | Lewis; Taylor; Werner | 4:49 |
| 7. | "Broken Shadows" | Ornette Coleman | 3:28 |
| 8. | "D.C. Got Pocket" | Lewis; Taylor; Werner | 4:57 |
| 9. | "Apple Cores No. 3" | Lewis; Taylor; Werner | 3:15 |
| 10. | "Don't Forget Jayne" | Lewis; Taylor; Werner | 3:43 |
| 11. | "Exactly, Our Music" | Lewis; Taylor; Werner | 3:22 |

== Personnel ==
Adapted credits from AllMusic.

Musicians

- James Brandon Lewis - primary artist
- Ornette Coleman - composer
- Chad Taylor - drums, mbira
- Guilherme Monteiro - guitar
- Josh Werner - bass, guitar
- Stephane San Juan - percussion

Production

- Daniel Schlett - mixing
- Jake Owen - engineer
- James Dellatacoma - engineer
- Josh Druckman - engineer
- Paul Wycliffe - mastering

== Charts ==
Chart performance for Apple Cores
| Chart (2025) | Peak position |
|---|---|
| UK Jazz & Blues Albums (Official Charts) | 28 |
