= Shivering King and Others =

Studio album by Dead Meadow
- Released: June 3, 2003
- Recorded: August 2002 – January 2003
- Genre: Psychedelic rock, stoner rock
- Length: 62:04
- Label: Matador

Dead Meadow chronology
Got Live If You Want It (2002)	Shivering King and Others (2003)	Feathers (2005)

Professional ratings
Review scores
Source	Rating
Allmusic	4.5/5 stars

Shivering King and Others is the third studio album by American psychedelic rock\stoner rock band Dead Meadow. It was released on CD and double LP by Matador Records in 2003.

== Track listing ==
1. "I Love You Too" – 7:16
2. "Babbling Flower" – 4:48
3. "Everything's Going On" – 7:05
4. "The Whirlings" – 3:24
5. "Wayfarers All" – 1:41
6. "Good Moanin'" – 6:41
7. "Golden Cloud" – 6:32
8. "Me and the Devil Blues" – 3:37
9. "Shivering King" – 5:59
10. "She's Mine" – 1:18
11. "Heaven" – 6:51
12. "Raise the Sails" – 6:52

== Critical reception ==
AllMusic gave a positive review towards the album, complimenting both its short punchier songs and its lengthier ballads, calling it "Bludgeoning and beautiful all at once". Pitchfork gave a mostly positive review, particularly appreciating its shorter songs and added themes "with influences ranging from post-rock to black-metal", however felt that the two ending, longer, songs were overly repetitive with the same motifs repeated.
