= Tolotta Records =

Tolotta
- Founded: 1994
- Founder: Joe Lally
- Status: Defunct
- Genre: Heavy metal Doom metal Hard rock
- Country of origin: United States
- Location: Arlington, Virginia

Tolotta Records was a record label run by Joe Lally of Fugazi. It was based in Arlington, Virginia, and distributed through Dischord Records. The label has released bands from Washington, D.C., and the surrounding area, such as Dead Meadow and Spirit Caravan. The label was founded in 1994 and came to an end in 2002 when Spirit Caravan broke up and Dead Meadow moved to Matador Records. Shortly after Lally set-up the label, the German label Hellhound Records (who were heavily vested in the Maryland doom metal scene) disbanded, leaving Tolotta to pick up some of the slack. Tolotta re-released The Obsessed's first album (originally released by Hellhound) and picked up Scott Weinrich's new band, Shine, who later changed their name to Spirit Caravan.

== Discography ==
- Tol 01 – Sevens – "Hammer" 7"
- Tol 02 – Stinking Lizaveta – "War of the Worlds" 7"
- Tol 03 – Shine – "Lost Sun Dance" 7"
- Tol 04 – Spirit Caravan – Jug Fulla Sun CD
- Tol 05 – The Obsessed – The Obsessed CD
- Tol 06 – Dead Meadow – Dead Meadow CD
- Tol 07 – Spirit Caravan – Elusive Truth CD/LP
- Tol 08 – Stinking Lizaveta – III CD
- Tol 09 – Orthrelm – Iorxhscimtor CDEP/12" EP
- Tol 10 – Dead Meadow – Howls from the Hills CD/LP
- Tol 10.5 – Joe Lally – Why Should I Get Used to It CD/LP
- Tol 11 – Spirit Caravan – "So Mortal Be" 7"
- Tol 12 – Stinking Lizaveta – ...Hopelessness and Shame. CD
- Tol 13 – Stinking Lizaveta – Slaughterhouse CD

== See also ==
- List of record labels
