= Haters (novel) =

2006 novel by Alisa Valdes-Rodriguez

- First edition
- Author: Alisa Valdes-Rodriguez
- Language: English
- Genre: Young adult novel
- Publisher: Little, Brown
- Publication date: October 4, 2006
- Publication place: United States
- Media type: Print (Hardback)
- Pages: 368 pp
- ISBN: 0-316-01307-2
- OCLC: 63692346
- LC Class: PZ7.V2158 Hat 2006

Haters is the 2006 debut young adult novel by Alisa Valdes-Rodriguez.

== Plot summary ==
Haters follows the character of Pasquala Rumalda Quintana de Archuleta, also known as Paski, as she tries to deal with extreme changes in her life. As a result of her father's comic strip getting optioned for a movie, Paski and her father move to California. Once there, Paski finds herself in a school where materialism and "haters" control the social circles. Paski begins to develop feelings for the handsome Chris Cabrera, who happens to be dating Jessica Nguyen, the resident mean girl. Paski soon finds herself dealing with more problems than Jessica, as she also finds that she has the psychic "gift" of premonition and is predicting Jessica having a terrible accident while participating in a motorcycle competition.

== Reception ==
Critical reception for Haters has been mostly positive, with Teenreads calling it a "charming, dishy chick lit with a side of supernatural". Booklist wrote that Haters was "shopworn" with "heavy contrivances", but that readers would be won over by the "hilarious, likable, resilient Paski". The School Library Journal stated that "Paski's first-person narrative is lively and honest". Kirkus Reviews wrote that the book "has the potential to reach a wide audience, although its length will discourage many reluctant readers who might otherwise enjoy it". Publishers Weekly criticized the book's ending, saying it "fulfilled desires rather than real life" but that "readers will likely take delight in seeing the good guys and the bad guys get exactly what they deserve".

== Controversy ==
Haters received some controversy at Aliso Niguel High when it was revealed that one of the characters in the book (a teacher accused of wanting to sleep with his students) and an educator at school had nearly identical names. Valdes-Rodriguez responded, stating that the similarity between the names of the character and the teacher was purely coincidental and that she had used the school as a setting due to her familiarity with the area, having attended the school. Students and faculty at the school also voiced concerns over the depicting the students as "diverse in ethnicity but ... alike in their cruelty" and the school as a location where "money is everything and the Haters rule".
