= Sacrifice and Bliss =

2009 studio album by Stinking Lizaveta

Studio album by Stinking Lizaveta
- Released: March 16, 2009
- Genre: Doom metal, stoner metal, instrumental rock
- Length: 40:46
- Label: At A Loss Recordings
- Producer: Sanford Parker

Stinking Lizaveta chronology
Scream of the Iron Iconoclast (2007)	Sacrifice and Bliss (2009)

Sacrifice and Bliss is the seventh studio album by the Philadelphia band Stinking Lizaveta.

The album was rated 4 out of 5 stars by AllMusic.

== Track listing ==
1. "Autochthony! Autochthony!" - 5:03
2. "A Day Without A Murder" - 3:49
3. "Zeitgeist, The Movie" - 3:39
4. "When I Love You" - 3:49
5. "Sacrifice and Bliss" - 4:29
6. "We Will See" - 5:22
7. "A Man Without A Country" - 2:33
8. "Superluxation" - 3:51
9. "Trouble Mountain" - 4:16
10. "The Man Needs Your Pain" - 3:55
