= So Tired =

So Tired may refer to:

- "So Tired", a song by Haircut 100 from Paint and Paint
- "So Tired" (Ozzy Osbourne song), 1983

== See also ==
- I'm So Tired (disambiguation)
- "Tired of Waiting for You", a 1965 song by The Kinks
