= The Messthetics (album) =

Studio album by the Messthetics
- Released: March 23, 2018
- Recorded: 2017
- Studios: Brendan Canty's practice space, Washington, D.C.
- Genre: Rock
- Labels: Dischord, DIS186CD

The Messthetics chronology
The Messthetics (2018)	Anthropocosmic Nest (2019)

The Messthetics is the debut album by the band of the same name, featuring bassist Joe Lally and drummer Brendan Canty of Fugazi along with guitarist Anthony Pirog, best known for his association with the band Skysaw and the duo Janel & Anthony. Recorded by Canty at his practice space in Washington, D.C. during 2017, it was released on March 23, 2018, by Dischord Records.

The album marked the first time Canty and Lally had recorded together since Fugazi's 2001 release The Argument. Regarding the duo's decision to team up with Pirog, Canty stated that he was attracted to the fact that Pirog "was playing really wildly different things in every situation," and noted that the guitarist's introduction of fast, odd-metered material felt "like catching baseballs in a batting cage." The album was recorded in such a way as to preserve the raw feel and sound of the group's early jam sessions; Canty commented: "Often in the past, the initial inspiration for a piece of music gets forgotten by the time you get around to properly recording it. Having all the mics set up and recording during our practices seems to solve that problem."

== Reception ==
Professional ratings
Review scores
Source	Rating
AllMusic	3.5/5 stars
Pitchfork	7.4/10

In a review for AllMusic, Mark Deming stated that "listeners who embraced Fugazi's more experimental side... will doubtless be pleased" with the album, and described the group as "a bold, bracing, fearless band... playing music that challenges and dazzles." He commented: "this music delivers no marching orders, though the clarity of its expression and its joyous risk-taking are certainly inspiring in and of themselves."

Stuart Berman of Pitchfork called the album "an instrumental power-trio record that values economy and emotional resonance over technical wizardry and structural complexity," capturing "two old pals communing with a new one, exploring the potential of their developing dynamic and sculpting ideas into song-like shapes... This is a band tuning out the noise of the outside world by making some of their own."

Writing for The New York Times, Giovanni Russonello noted that "whether speeding and distorted or slow and ethereal, the Messthetics have a remarkable cohesion," and suggested that Pirog's guitar work "can feel both misty and assertive, partly because of the way his effects pedals create something hot and threatening, as if he's immolating his own notes as soon as they arrive."

NPR Music's Jason Heller remarked: "The Messthetics breathes and swims organically, a mini-symphony of telepathic, extemporaneous interplay between three modestly masterful musicians, a work that relocates the mind and brushes the soul while moving the body."

In an article for Exclaim!, Matthew Blenkarn stated that the album "encompasses both technical exploration and punk's bracing immediacy," but cautioned that "too often... Pirog's guitar heroics overshadow his bandmates."

Jonathan Bannister of Post Trash wrote: "The Messthetics is... an album you'll find yourself going back to time and again, finding new favorite moments to hit repeat on each time. It's an album that celebrates being a band, a cohesive unit that works together to create a singular sound."

Dusted Magazine's Jennifer Kelly stated: "for the most part, the wildest explorations leap from and return to a solid foundation, so that the music makes sense, even when it runs hottest... The nervy aggression of post-punk joins with jazz-rock's virtuosity here, and it's good stuff all the way through."

== Track listing ==
1. "Mythomania" – 4:09
2. "Serpent Tongue" – 4:00
3. "Once upon a Time" – 4:20
4. "Quantum Path" – 5:10
5. "Your Own World" – 1:05
6. "The Inner Ocean" – 6:02
7. "Radiation Fog" – 0:50
8. "Crowds and Power" – 4:53
9. "The Weaver" – 3:10

== Personnel ==
- Brendan Canty – drums
- Joe Lally – bass
- Anthony Pirog – guitar
