= Why Should I Get Used to It =

Studio album by Joe Lally
- Released: April 26, 2011
- Recorded: January 2010
- Studios: MHouse, Rome, Italy
- Genre: Rock
- Length: 31:38
- Labels: Dischord, DIS168.5CD, Tollotta, TOL10.5

Joe Lally chronology
Nothing Is Underrated (2007)	Why Should I Get Used to It (2011)

Why Should I Get Used to It is the third solo album by Fugazi bassist Joe Lally. Featuring eleven original songs, it was recorded at MHouse in Rome, Italy, during January 2010, and was released in 2011 by both Dischord Records and Lally's Tolotta label. On the album, Lally is accompanied by two Italian musicians: guitarist Elisa Abela, and drummer Emanuele Tomasi.

The album was recorded after Lally had moved to Italy, where he met Abela, whom he described as a multi-instrumentalist who can "play music on whatever is in front of her," and Tomasi, "a free jazz kind of drummer." Lally suggested that the four-year gap between his second and third releases was the result of the fact that he took more time writing the songs, while at the same time touring in Europe and Japan. Regarding the music, he noted that the "record comes out of my own head more than the other ones," and stated that, whereas on the two previous albums he attempted to "creat[e] a skeleton... an atmosphere or texture" that he would use to guide the musicians, on Why Should I Get Used to It, he "began really trying to flesh out the songs and get them down as demos" prior to rehearsals.

== Reception ==
Professional ratings
Review scores
Source	Rating
The Austin Chronicle	3.5/5 stars
PopMatters	8/10 stars
The Skinny	3/5 stars

In a review for PopMatters, Corey Beasley described the album as "a cohesive and layered statement, and a successful one," stating that it "sees [Lally] refining his melodic chops and exploring new textures in his gentle, clear voice," and noting his willingness to "experiment with song structures, restless, soft-loud, balancing introspection with forcefulness."

A writer for the Alternative Press commented: "the album spotlights Lally's greatest talent: avoiding the spotlight... At times, yes, it sounds like Fugazi—but at the same time, it's far more quietly assured and humbly, even eerily, virtuosic. Kind of like Lally himself."

Exclaim!'s Vish Khanna stated that the album "features some of the richest grooves and startling playing of any record [Lally's] been a part of," and called it his "finest post-Fugazi work."

Jason Morton of The Skinny wrote: "while Lally's plaintive vocals might not purvey the same passion as his former bandmates, this LP should satiate the appetites of Fugazi fans, as well as people who like challenging music that doesn't sacrifice melody to push the envelope."

A reviewer for the Washington City Paper noted the album's "unfussy post-punk sonics, a close-up production aesthetic, and [Lally's] singular, nearly deadpan vocals," and remarked: "Why Should I Get Used To It is incrementally edgier than its predecessors, either because Lally bumps up the rhythms or turns up the guitar... His bandmates seem to be nudging him a little, too."

Writing for The Boston Globe, Scott McLennan called the album the best of Lally's solo releases to date, and stated: "Lally has... settled into a comfortable and confident singing voice, leaning into sincerity to compensate for obvious limitations in range... smarts and clear vision steer this trio of singularly talented musicians into being a true band."

== Track listing ==
1. "What Makes You" – 2:43
2. "Nothing to Lose" – 2:07
3. "Revealed in Fever" – 4:42
4. "Fort Campbell, KY" – 2:50
5. "Philosophy for Insects" – 2:42
6. "Ken-Gar" – 1:00
7. "Why Should I Get Used to It" – 3:07
8. "Coral and Starfish" – 1:30
9. "Let It Burn" – 3:36
10. "Ministry of the Interior" – 3:30
11. "Last of the Civilized" – 3:51

== Personnel ==
- Joe Lally – bass, guitar, organ, "fake strings", vocals
- Elisa Abela – guitar, flute
- Emanuele Tomasi – drums, percussion
- Christine Mairer – cello (track 10)
