= Alisa Valdes =

American writer (born 1969)

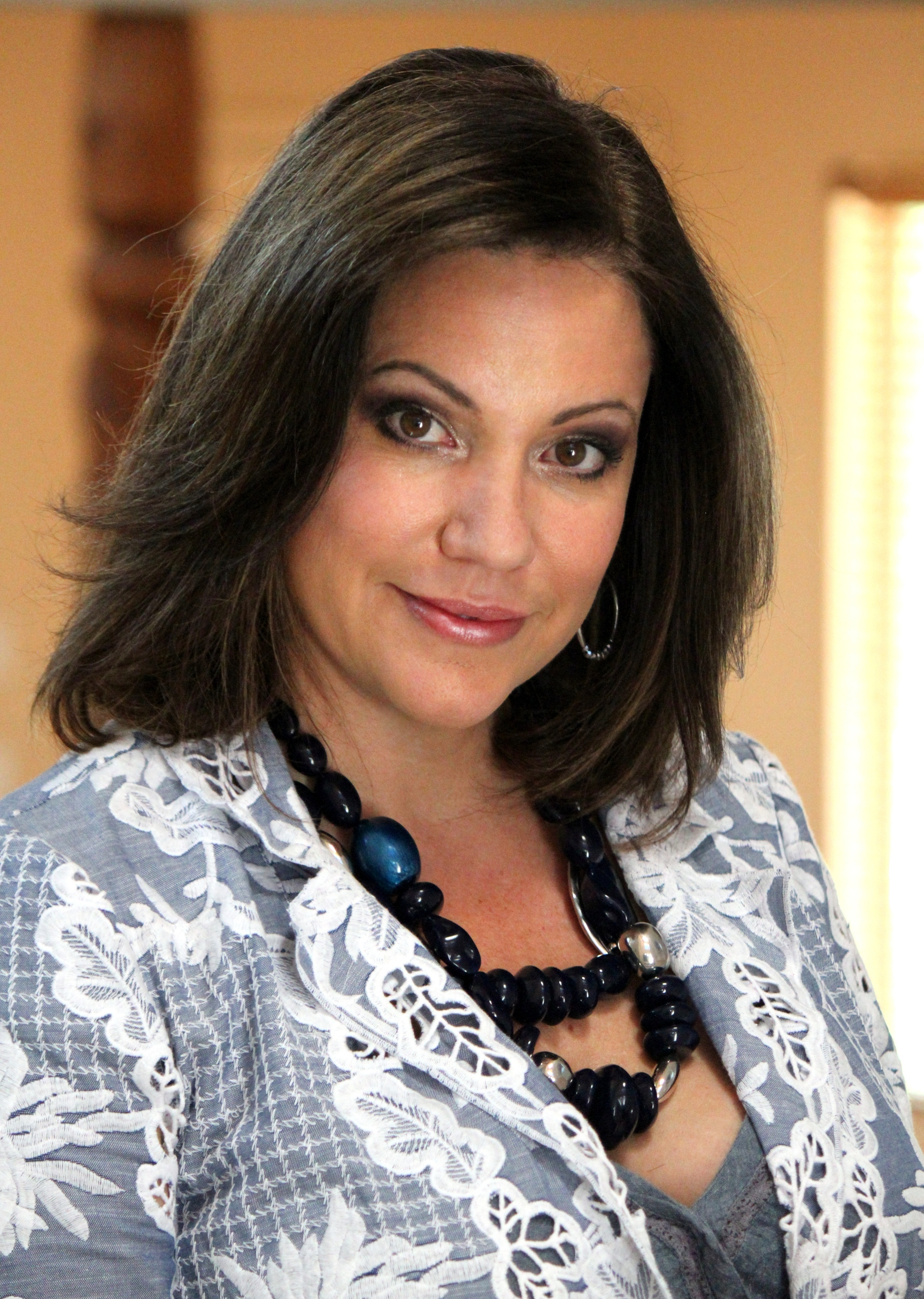
- Valdes in Mexico, August 2013
- Born: February 28, 1969 (age 57); Albuquerque, New Mexico, U.S.
- Occupations: Novelist, journalist
- Spouse: Patrick Rodriguez (m. 1998; div. 2005)
- Children: 1
- Writing career
- Genres: Women's commercial fiction a.k.a. chick lit; young adult
- Website: alisavaldesbooks.com/about

Alisa Valdes (born 1969 in Albuquerque, New Mexico) is an American author, journalist, and film producer, known for her novel, The Dirty Girls Social Club. She is also known as Alisa Valdés-Rodríguez.

== Early life ==
Valdes was born in Albuquerque, New Mexico. Her father, Nelson Valdés, is a retired sociology professor at the University of New Mexico, who emigrated from Cuba in the early 1960s. Her mother, Maxine Conant, is a seventh-generation New Mexican of mixed heritage, including Spanish, Mexican, Portuguese Jewish, Puebloan, and Irish ancestry, and is a descendant of Roger Conant, founder of Salem, Massachusetts, and Vermont revolutionary Ethan Allen.

Valdes spent her childhood primarily in New Mexico, but also lived briefly in Glasgow, Scotland and New Orleans. Upon her graduation from Del Norte High School in Albuquerque she attended Berklee College of Music in Boston where she majored in jazz performance on the tenor saxophone.

== Journalism career ==
While a student at Berklee, Valdes began writing freelance music reviews for The Boston Globe. After graduating from Berklee in 1992, she took an unpaid internship at the Village Voice, before going back to school to earn a master's degree from the Columbia University Graduate School of Journalism in 1994.

Valdes joined the staff of The Boston Globe in 1994, where she wrote for the Living/Arts section. Her essay for The Boston Globe Magazine, "Daughter of Cuba," won first place in the 1998 SUNMAG essay contest. In 1999, Valdes left Boston for a position as staff writer in the Calendar section of the Los Angeles Times. Her articles have appeared in dozens of newspapers, and she has written cover stories for Glamour and Redbook.

Valdes continues to work in journalism, writing a weekly parenting column for the website "Mamiverse", an opinion piece for NBC Latino, a travel piece for London newspaper The Guardian, and contributing posts for The Huffington Post Books section.

In 2026, working as an independent journalist and publishing on her Substack page entitled "The Pugilist with Alisa Valdes-Rodriguez," Valdes began reporting on financier and child sex trafficker Jeffrey Epstein and his Zorro Ranch in New Mexico; as well as his connections with the nuclear industrial complex in the state. In mid-2026, she relocated to Spain after claiming to have been targeted in her New Mexico home by multiple debilitating directed-energy weapon attacks.

== Literary career ==
Her first novel, The Dirty Girls Social Club, was purchased by St. Martin's Press a little more than a year after she left the Los Angeles Times. She was paid an advance of $475,000 after five publishing houses bid for the manuscript. In a profile of the writer, entitled "The Latina Terry McMillan?", Chicago Tribune reporter Patrick T. Reardon wrote: "What made [the book] especially hot was the belief among publishers that Valdes-Rodriguez could be the long-sought 'Latina Terry McMillan' -- a writer whose work would jump-start Hispanic book buying in the U.S. and create a new profitable publishing niche..." The Dirty Girls Social Club garnered media attention and went on to become a New York Times bestseller and a Booksense 76 top pick.

Valdes has since written twelve novels: Playing With Boys in 2004; Make Him Look Good in 2006; a young adult novel, Haters, in 2006; Dirty Girls on Top, a sequel to The Dirty Girls Social Club, in 2008, The Husband Habit in 2009, and The Three Kings in 2010, All That Glitters in 2011, Lauren's Saints of Dirty Faith in 2011, The Temptation in 2012, Puta in 2013, The Temptation of Demetrio Vigil in 2013, and the short romance ebooks Billy, the Man; A Better Love Than Husband, and Forgive Me My Sins, all in 2013.

Valdes wrote a memoir, The Feminist and the Cowboy: An Unlikely Love Story, published in 2013. The book detailed her relationship with a conservative ranch hand and how it led her to rethink some of her feminist beliefs. After its publication, Valdes alleged that the relationship was abusive.

In 2005, Time dubbed Valdes "The Godmother of Chica Lit" and named her one of the 25 most influential Hispanics in the United States.Hispanic Business Magazine has twice named her among the 100 Most Influential Hispanics in America. In 2006, the Hispanic Congressional Caucus awarded Valdes with a Latina Leadership award, and she participated in the National Book Festival at the Library of Congress. She also received the Theatre of Hearts "Youth First" award in Los Angeles in 2004.

== Film career ==
Before its publication in 2003, the film rights to The Dirty Girls Social Club were optioned by Columbia Pictures with Jennifer Lopez and Laura Ziskin as producers, but the option expired without going into production. The Lifetime Television network then began to develop the book as a television series. The project did not progress beyond development. Valdes next partnered with Nely Galán's Cienfuegos Films company, to make an independent film based upon the novel, with Valdes, Galán and Debra Martin Chase as executive producers and Valdes as creator and screenwriter, but the deal never came to pass.

Ann Lopez, ex-wife of comedian George Lopez, optioned The Dirty Girls Social Club in 2009. NBC was developing the novel with Lopez and her company Encanto Productions for the 2011-2012 television season. In December 2010, Valdes publicly accused Ann Lopez and screenplay writer Luisa Leschin of racism and homophobia after reading a draft of their proposed pilot script. She later retracted some of her statements about Lopez and Leschin, while maintaining her displeasure with the script. NBC ultimately did not order a pilot of The Dirty Girls Social Club.

Valdes formed her own production company, Valdes Entertainment Enterprises, in 2013 to develop The Dirty Girls Social Club for film. Valdes teamed up with television producers MarVista Entertainment to help produce the film.

== Bibliography ==
=== Novels ===
- The Dirty Girls Social Club (2003)
- Playing with Boys (2004)
- Make Him Look Good (2006)
- Haters (2006)
- Dirty Girls on Top (2008)
- The Husband Habit (2010)
- All That Glitters (2011)
- The Three Kings (2010)
- Laurens Saints of Dirty Faith (2011)
- The Temptation (2012)
- Puta (2012)
- The Temptation of Demetrio Vigil (2013)
- Hollow Beasts (2023)
- Where Rabbits Gathered

=== Novelitas ===
- Lauren's Very Dirty Chapter (2012)
- Billy, the Man (2012)
- Better Lover Than a Husband (2013)
- Forgive Me My Sins (2013)

=== Anthologies ===
- Girls Night In (2004)
- Girls Night Out (anthology) (2006)
- Maybe Baby (anthology) (2006)

=== Memoirs ===
- The Feminist and the Cowboy (2013)

== See also ==
- List of Cuban American writers
- List of Cuban Americans
