= Scream of the Iron Iconoclast =

Studio album by Stinking Lizaveta
- Released: April 23, 2007
- Genre: Doom metal Stoner metal Instrumental rock
- Length: 60:01
- Label: At a Loss Recordings
- Producer: Steve Albini

Stinking Lizaveta chronology
| Caught Between Worlds (2004) | Scream of the Iron Iconoclast (2007) | Sacrifice and Bliss (2009) |

Scream of the Iron Iconoclast is the fifth studio album by the Philadelphia band Stinking Lizaveta.

The album was rated 3.5 out of 5 stars by AllMusic.

== Track listing ==
1. "Gravitas" - 2:43
2. "Scream of the Iron Iconoclast" - 3:40
3. "To the Sun" - 4:27
4. "Secrets of the Past" - 5:07
5. "Willie Nelson (Tired of the War)" - 4:36
6. "Unreal" - 6:03
7. "Yagan's Head" - 2:08
8. "Thirteenth Moon" - 3:35
9. "Soul Retrieval" - 4:37
10. "Indomitable Wall" - 2:31
11. "Presence of Mind" - 3:44
12. "Requiem for a Rock Band" - 4:59
13. "That's How I Feel" - 3:38
14. "Cyclops" - 3:34
15. "The Neutral Ground" - 3:57
16. "Nails" - 1:41
