= Joe Lally =

Musical artist (born 1963)

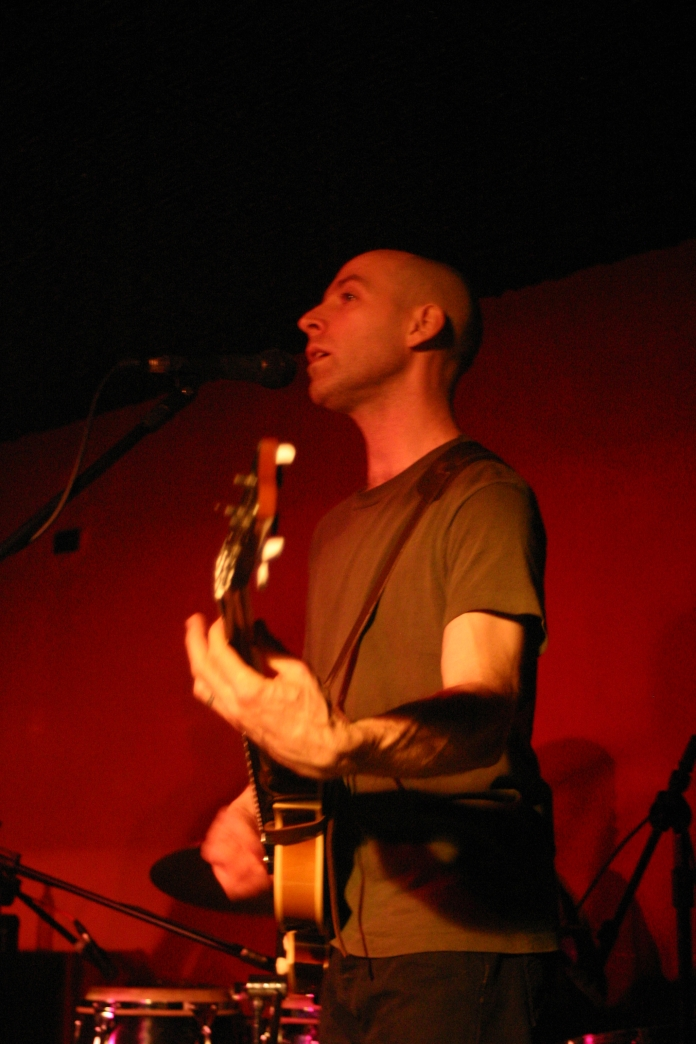
- Joe Lally in Campinas, Sao Paulo, 2008

Background information
- Born: December 3, 1963 (age 62); Silver Spring, Maryland, United States
- Genres: Post-hardcore; indie rock; experimental rock; art punk; progressive rock; post-punk
- Occupations: Musician; songwriter
- Instruments: Bass guitar; vocals; guitar
- Member of: The Messthetics
- Formerly of: Fugazi; Ataxia; Decahedron; Coriky

Joseph Francis Lally (born December 3, 1963) is an American bassist, vocalist and record label owner, best known for his work with Fugazi.

== Biography ==
Lally was born in Silver Spring, Maryland.

=== Fugazi ===
Joe Lally formed Fugazi with Ian MacKaye in 1987. He remained as the group's bassist until their "indefinite hiatus" in 2003.

=== Tolotta records ===
Lally founded Tolotta Records (distributed through Dischord Records), which was active from 1994 until 2001, putting out notable releases by such artists as Dead Meadow, Spirit Caravan, Stinking Lizaveta & Orthrelm.

=== Side projects ===
In early 2002, Lally joined ex-Frodus members Shelby Cinca and Jason Hamacher on a project originally called The Black Sea, which would change its name to Decahedron and release an EP and an album before Lally left the band. He has also worked with John Frusciante and Josh Klinghoffer as the group Ataxia, releasing two albums: Automatic Writing (2004) and AW II (2007).

=== Solo work ===
In 2006, Lally was playing solo shows on bass with slight laptop accompaniment in various college towns, leading up to his first solo album, There to Here, which was released in the fall of 2006. It features Jerry Busher, Ian MacKaye, Amy Farina, Guy Picciotto, Scott Weinrich and many other musicians from the DC music scene.

In 2007, he toured the U.S. with the Philadelphia band Capillary Action and Melvins, and Europe and Japan with the Italian band Zu. His second solo album, Nothing Is Underrated, was released in November 2007.

Lally released his 3rd album, Why Should I Get Used to It, in April 2011.

=== The Messthetics ===
In 2016, Lally formed the instrumental trio The Messthetics with guitarist Anthony Pirog and Fugazi drummer Brendan Canty. The band released its self-titled debut on Dischord Records in 2018.

=== Coriky ===
In 2018, Lally with Ian MacKaye (Fugazi) and Amy Farina (The Evens) debuted a new band. In February 2020, it was announced that the band, now called Coriky, would release their first album on March 27, 2020. The debut single, "Clean Kill", was released on February 11, 2020.

== Personal life ==
Joe lived in Rome, Italy with his wife and daughter until 2015, when he moved back to Washington DC.

== Discography ==
with Fugazi

- Fugazi (1988) Dischord
- Margin Walker (1989) Dischord
- Repeater (1990) Dischord
- Steady Diet of Nothing (1991) Dischord
- In on the Kill Taker (1993) Dischord
- Red Medicine (1995) Dischord
- End Hits (1998) Dischord
- The Argument (2001) Dischord

Solo

- There to Here (2006) Dischord
- Nothing Is Underrated (2007) Dischord
- Why Should I Get Used to It (2011) Dischord

with The Messthetics

- The Messthetics (2018) Dischord
- Anthropocosmic Nest (2019) Dischord
- The Messthetics and James Brandon Lewis (2024) Impulse!

with Coriky

- Coriky (2020) Dischord
