= Dead Meadow =

American psychedelic rock band

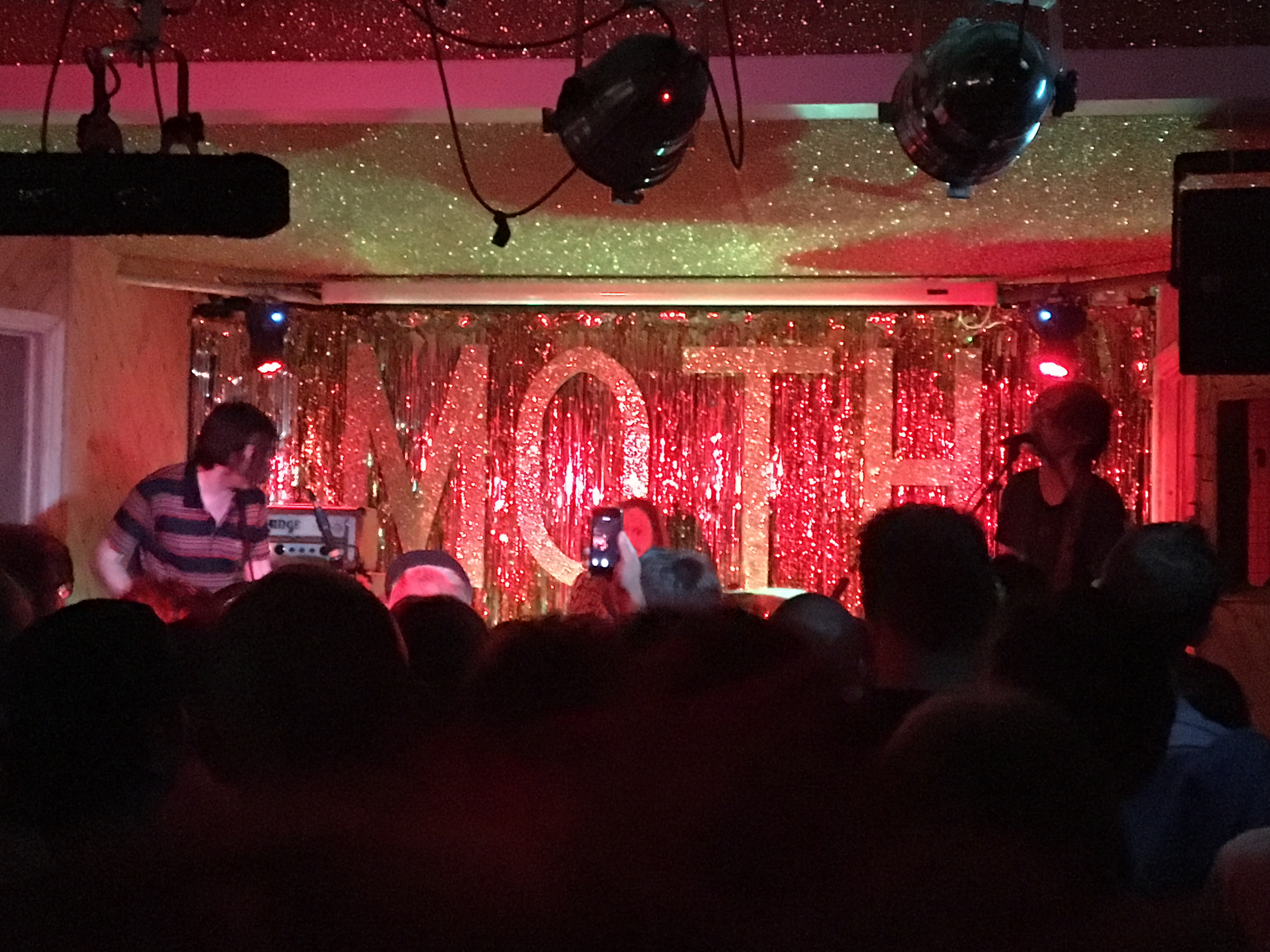
- Dead Meadow performing at The Moth Club, London in 2016

Background information
- Origin: Washington, D.C., United States
- Genres: Stoner rock, psychedelic rock
- Years active: 1998–present
- Labels: Matador, Tolotta, Xemu Records
- Members: Jason Simon; Mark Laughlin
- Past members: Juan Londono; Stephen McCarty; Cory Shane; Steve Kille
- Website: deadmeadow.com

Dead Meadow is an American psychedelic rock band formed in Washington, D.C., in 1998 and currently composed of vocalist and guitarist Jason Simon and drummer Mark Laughlin. The band have released seven studio albums, two live albums, and a Peel Session.

== History ==
=== Formation, Dead Meadow, Howls From the Hills, and Peel session (1998-2001) ===
Dead Meadow formed in 1998 from the remnants of two local D.C. bands, The Impossible Five and Colour. The band started as Jason Simon on vocals and guitar, Steve Kille on bass, and Mark Laughlin on drums. They combined 1970s heavy metal and 1960s psychedelic rock with themes from authors such as J. R. R. Tolkien and H. P. Lovecraft. The first album, Dead Meadow, was released in 2000 on Tolotta Records, a label run by Fugazi bassist Joe Lally. The vinyl LP version was released by Planaria Records. This was followed by 2001's Howls from the Hills, also released on Tolotta Records.

Having heard the band's first album, John Peel asked the band to record a Peel Session. Unable to afford to tour internationally, the band recorded their session in Fugazi's home studio using an 8-track recorder previously owned by Minor Threat, the first time a Peel Session was recorded outside the BBC studios. Primarily featuring energetic versions of songs from their first two albums, Dead Meadow's session was officially released in 2011 as Peel Sessions, and includes two additional tracks recorded during the same period.

=== Laughlin's departure, signing to Matador Records, and Shivering King and Others (2002-2004) ===
In spring 2002, Laughlin left the band in order to attend law school and pursue a career as a lawyer. He was replaced by long-time friend and former Canyon drummer Stephen McCarty. In mid 2002, the band released the live album, Got Live If You Want It, which documented one of the last shows with Laughlin and was produced, mixed and released by Anton Newcombe of Brian Jonestown Massacre. In early 2003 the band signed to Matador Records and released Shivering King and Others.

=== Addition of Cory Shane and Feathers (2005-2007) ===
Along with the heavy song and blues-influenced songs as on the previous two records, the band continued in their psychedelic style, with acoustic elements and ballads. With the addition of second guitarist Cory Shane, Feathers was released in 2005.

The band's music was used briefly in both the season four premiere "Boys of Summer" and the season five episode "React Quotes" of The Wire. Simon is the nephew of the series creator David Simon.

In 2007, the band reverted to a three piece. They performed at the Green Man Festival in the UK and relocated from Washington, D.C., to Los Angeles, California.

=== Old Growth and Three Kings (2008-2010) ===
In early 2008, the band released Old Growth on Matador Records. A collection of songs that brought the band back initially to the same farm where their second release Howls from the Hills was created and eventually finished up at the Sunset Sound studio in Los Angeles. As with the last three albums, Old Growth was produced by bassist Steve Kille.

Following a brief session with Andrew Stockdale of Wolfmother, a reinterpretation of the band's song "Everything's Goin' On" was released as "Pilgrim" on Wolfmother's second album "Cosmic Egg".

In March 2010 the band released a live film and soundtrack, Three Kings, which was recorded at the final show of the band's five-month "Old Growth" tour. The film premiered at the Hollywood Forever Cemetery in Los Angeles, California and was released on their own record label Xemu Records. The film was directed by Simon Chan & Joe Rubalcaba of Artificial Army.

=== Return of Laughlin, signing to Xemu Records, and Warble Womb (2010-2017) ===
In August 2010, it was announced that original drummer Mark Laughlin had re-joined the band and were confirmed to play two dates in the U.S. and a tour of Australia. In January 2011, Laughlin postponed his career in law to rejoin the band permanently and tour Europe and the Pacific Northwest of the U.S. The band released Warble Womb in November 2013, their first new album to feature Laughlin since 2002. The album was released on the band's own label Xemu Records.

Although not officially announced, it was revealed in February 2016 that Laughlin (taking a break from touring) had been replaced by Juan Londono, formerly of Strangers Family Band.

=== The Nothing They Need and Force Form Free (2018-2023) ===
In March 2018, the band released their 7th album The Nothing They Need through Xemu Records.

In December 2022, Dead Meadow released its 8th studio album, Force Form Free through Blues Funeral Recordings.

=== Death of Steve Kille and Voyager to Voyager (2024-present) ===
Bass guitarist Steve Kille died on April 18, 2024. The band released their 9th studio album, Voyager To Voyager, on March 28, 2025, with Kille's bass parts being included posthumously.

== Band members ==
=== Current members ===
- Jason Simon – vocals, guitars
- Mark Laughlin – drums

=== Former members ===
- Stephen McCarty – drums
- Cory Shane – guitars
- Juan Londono – drums
- Steve Kille – bass, sitar (died 2024)

== Discography ==
=== Studio albums ===
- Dead Meadow (2000)
- Howls from the Hills (2001)
- Shivering King and Others (2003)
- Feathers (2005)
- Old Growth (2008)
- Peel Sessions (2012, recorded 2001)
- Warble Womb (2013)
- The Nothing They Need (2018)
- Force Form Free (2022)
- Voyager To Voyager (2025)
- Foundlings (2026)

=== Live albums ===
- Got Live If You Want It (2002)
- Three Kings (live/DVD, 2010)
- Live At Roadburn 2011 (2020)
- Levitation Sessions: Live From The Pillars Of God (2021)

=== Other appearances ===
- "Mele Kalikimaka" on Psych-Out Christmas (Cleopatra Records, 2013)

=== Music videos ===
- "Heaven" (2005)
- "At Her Open Door" (2005)
- "What Needs Must Be" (2008)
- "1000 Dreams" (2013)
- "Here With the Hawk" (2018)
- "Valmont's Pad" (2022)
- "The Whirlings (Feathers Session)" (2025)
- "Dead Tree Shake" (2025)
- "Voyager to Voyager" (2025)
