= End Hits =

Studio album by Fugazi
- Released: April 28, 1998
- Recorded: March–September 1997
- Studio: Inner Ear Studios, Arlington
- Genre: Post-hardcore; noise rock; experimental rock; art punk
- Length: 47:48
- Label: Dischord
- Producer: Fugazi

Fugazi chronology
Red Medicine (1995)	End Hits (1998)	Instrument Soundtrack (1999)

End Hits is the fifth studio album by American post-hardcore band Fugazi, released on April 28, 1998, by Dischord Records. It was recorded at Inner Ear Studios from March 1997 to September 1997 and produced by the band and Don Zientara, and saw the band continuing with and expanding upon the in-studio experimentation of their previous album Red Medicine (1995). Due to the title, rumors began circulating at the time that it was to be their last release.

While the album received mixed reviews upon release due to its experimental nature, End Hits has retrospectively received critical acclaim with many publications hailing it as an influential and classic album.

== Background ==
Due to the album's title, many speculated that it would be the band's last release, although the title literally refers to the end-of-the-album drum hits by drummer Brendan Canty that occur after the last song on the album, "F/D," ends. These drum hits are actually outtakes from the bridge-section of the track "No Surprise," the fourth song on the album. The title was later revealed to have been an inside-joke by the band.

== Recording ==
After the grueling worldwide tour the band had completed in support of their previous album, 1995's Red Medicine, Fugazi took an extended break and also began writing material for a follow-up release. By March 1997 they had once again returned to Inner Ear Studios with producer/engineer Don Zientara to begin recording what would become the End Hits album with the intention of taking a more relaxed approach to recording and a longer amount of time to experiment with different songs and techniques in the studio. The group ultimately spent 7 months recording the album.

A wide variety of sound effects and unusual microphone placements were used during both the recording and mixing process. In addition, the band used electronic drums, synthesizers and the practice of drum-layering for the first time, which is most evident on the track "Closed Captioned." Brendan Canty explained to Tape Op Magazine in 1999 "When "Closed Captioned" was recorded, the basic tracks to it are all a drum machine and then I overdubbed two different drum sets on top of it, which I love doing, it gives distance to a song." Recording for the track "Floating Boy" saw all the drum mics removed at the end of the song except for the bottom-snare mic, to create a hollow and muffled sound, after which synthesizer and several layers of reverb were added.

== Release and reception ==
Professional ratings
Review scores
Source	Rating
AllMusic	3/5 stars
Encyclopedia of Popular Music	3/5 stars
NME	7/10
OndaRock	7/10
The Philadelphia Inquirer	3/4 stars
Pitchfork	9.0/10
Rock Hard	8.0/10
Rolling Stone	3.5/5 stars
The Rolling Stone Album Guide	3.5/5 stars
Uncut	8/10

Released on April 28, 1998, the album was commercially successful and marked one of the band's highest debuts yet on the Billboard charts. According to Nielsen Soundscan, End Hits sold 81,000 copies in the United States as of 2001.

=== Initial ===
Critical reaction to End Hits was mixed. Many critics praised the album's heavier tracks like "Five Corporations" and "Place Position" while others questioned the inclusion of the group's longer, more experimental songs like "Closed Captioned" and "Floating Boy". AllMusic critic Andy Kellman singled out the tracks "Closed Captioned", "Floating Boy" and "Foreman's Dog" as "the worst stretch of material Fugazi have recorded", noting a "virtually complete disregard for linearity that makes things seem stitched together."

NME journalist Stephen Dalton was more positive, calling End Hits "a rather good record from a well-meaning bunch who are finally allowing a little colour and tenderness into their slate-grey terrorist cell." The magazine would go on to name the album among their 50 favorites of the year. Mojo critic Jenny Bulley remarked that certain tracks seemed to have resulted from "lengthy jam sessions," observing that "on 'Closed Caption' [sic] they meander more than is strictly necessary, though the approach works brilliantly on the darker, dubbier 'Pink Frosty'." She concluded that End Hits "may not be the requisite one-stop shop for Fugazi's music, but it's a fine record nonetheless."

=== Retrospective ===
Four years after the release of End Hits, The A.V. Club's Joshua Klein noted that "the music continues in the experimental vein" of Red Medicine and would likely disappoint fans expecting more conventional rock songs, while describing End Hits as "a curious look at America's most vital band as it finds new and inventive ways to buckle and squirm under its self-imposed constraints." In 2005, Stylus' Clay Jarvis praised the album as being "a massive step forward for Fugazi: quieter, as the band replaced volume with audible creative force; illogical, as unpredictability became the core of a new world of dynamics for the band; experimental, but in all the right places and for all the right reasons. End Hits is a masterful combination of playing and mixing, improvising and editing. And yet it all sounds so natural." A few years later, Trouser Press lauded End Hits as a continuation of "the evolutionary sonic path first carved out on Red Medicine, except with more focus and even less reliance on the formulaic punk chug of their own invention."

In 2018, Pitchfork ranked it the 24th best album of 1998; staff writer Sasha Geffen wrote that Fugazi had managed to produce some of their most melodic and accessible songs "without sacrificing any of the muscle of their first four LPs." The same year, on its 20th anniversary, both NME and Magnet offered the album praise, calling it an "influential" and "classic" album, respectively. Fact called it an "audacious trip from a fearless band," labeling it a "classic in the canon of an impossibly important band" and "a monumental album."

=== Legacy ===
Buke and Gase covered "Guilford Fall" live. Dead to Me and TheSTART covered "Five Corporations" and "Place Position" respectively. Rapper P.O.S references and samples the song "Five Corporations" on his album False Hope, which was later released on Never Better.

== Packaging ==
The picture on the album cover is of Hong Kong with the Hopewell Centre prominent in the foreground. Limited vinyl copies of the album feature a gatefold cover, which folds out to display a live photograph of the band playing at the Palladium in New York City, taken by Glen E. Friedman.

== Track listing ==
All tracks are written by Fugazi.

No.	Title	Lead vocalist	Length
1.	"Break"	MacKaye	2:12
2.	"Place Position"	Picciotto	2:45
3.	"Recap Modotti"	Lally	3:50
4.	"No Surprise"	MacKaye and Picciotto	4:12
5.	"Five Corporations"	MacKaye	2:29
6.	"Caustic Acrostic"	Picciotto	2:01
7.	"Closed Captioned"	MacKaye	4:52
8.	"Floating Boy"	Picciotto	5:45
9.	"Foreman's Dog"	MacKaye and Picciotto	4:21
10.	"Arpeggiator"		4:28
11.	"Guilford Fall"	Picciotto	2:57
12.	"Pink Frosty"	MacKaye	4:09
13.	"F/D"	MacKaye and Picciotto	3:42
Total length:			47:48

== Personnel ==
- Ian MacKaye – guitar, vocals, composer, cover design, mixing
- Guy Picciotto – guitar, vocals, composer, cover design, mixing
- Joe Lally – bass, vocals, composer, cover design, mixing
- Brendan Canty – drums, composer, cover design, mixing

Technical

- Jerry Busher – photography
- Jem Cohen – cover design
- Jason Farrell – cover art
- Glen E. Friedman – photography
- Leanne Shapton – cover design
- Don Zientara – engineer

== Charts ==
=== Album ===
Billboard (North America)

Year	Chart	Position
1998	Billboard 200	138
