= Old Growth (album) =

Studio album by Dead Meadow
- Released: February 4, 2008
- Recorded: November 2006 – December 2006
- Genre: Psychedelic rock, stoner rock
- Length: 56:20
- Label: Matador Records

Dead Meadow chronology
Feathers (2005)	Old Growth (2008)	Warble Womb (2013)

Professional ratings
Review scores
Source	Rating
AllMusic	3/5 stars
Pitchfork	6.5/10 stars

Old Growth is the fifth studio album by American psychedelic rock band Dead Meadow. It was released in 2008 by Matador Records on CD and LP.

== Track listing ==
1. "Ain't Got Nothing (To Go Wrong)" – 6:58
2. "Between Me and the Ground" – 3:15
3. "What Needs Must Be" – 4:20
4. "Down Here" – 2:43
5. "'Till Kingdom Come" – 4:05
6. "I'm Gone" – 4:13
7. "Seven Seers" – 4:20
8. "The Great Deceiver" – 3:06
9. "The Queen of All Returns" – 5:33
10. "Keep on Walking" – 3:01
11. "Hard People/Hard Times" – 4:22
12. "Either Way" – 7:48

== Critical reception ==
AllMusic gave a mixed reception, both positive and negative towards the major change in themes – with a blues-rock focus over a heavier metal nature. Along with this general change there was an experimental nature to individual songs, with acoustic songs alongside slow groove. The review summarised the album as "still good, but isn't stoner rock supposed to sound destructive?" Pitchfork's review was also mixed and noted similar issues and positives.
