= The Three Kings (novel) =

2010 novel by Alisa Valdes-Rodriguez

First edition (publ. St. Martin's Press)

The Three Kings: A Christmas Dating Novel is a novel by Alisa Valdes-Rodriguez first published in 2010. The novel is set in Albuquerque, New Mexico, and frequently references the self-help books The Rules and Love in 90 Days.

== Summary ==
Christy de la Cruz is a twenty-nine-year-old interior designer who has recently divorced her husband, Zach, after he told her he was gay. After struggling on the dating scene she makes a prayer to the Virgen de Guadalupe asking her to send her three attractive men. Later, at a family barbecue, her cousin Maggie re-introduces Christy to Bathlazar Reyes, a former neighbour who tormented Christy when she was an overweight child, and his two cousins, Melchior and Caspar. The three cousins are named after the Biblical Magi as a tribute to their last name, Reyes.

Maggie suggests that since Christy is now attractive and single all three men take her on three dates at the end of which Christy will decide which one of them she wants to continue dating. The three men agree as does Christy despite her misgivings.

As she begins to date the three men, Christy reconnects with Maggie and the rest of her family to whom she had grown estranged due to her ex-husband and her financial success.

== Conception ==
Valdes-Rodriguez conceived the book after she began reading dating guides after her own divorce.
