= Warble Womb =

Studio album by Dead Meadow
- Released: November 25, 2013
- Genre: Stoner rock
- Length: 71:17
- Label: Xemu

Dead Meadow chronology
Old Growth (2008)	Warble Womb (2013)	The Nothing They Need (2018)

Professional ratings
Aggregate scores
Source	Rating
Metacritic	68/100
Review scores
Source	Rating
AllMusic	3.5/5 stars
Drowned in Sound	7/10

Warble Womb is the sixth studio album by American psychedelic rock band Dead Meadow. It was released in November 2013 under Xemu Records.

== Track listing ==
No.	Title	Length
1.	"Six to Let the Light Shine Thru"	6:05
2.	"1000 Dreams"	4:29
3.	"Mr. Chesty"	5:05
4.	"I'm Cured"	6:32
5.	"Warble Womb I"	1:56
6.	"Yesterday's Blowin' Back"	5:05
7.	"One More Toll Taker"	2:52
8.	"Rains in the Desert"	5:32
9.	"Burn the Here and Now"	5:18
10.	"All Torn Up"	5:01
11.	"In the Thicket"	2:57
12.	"Copper is Restless ('Til It Turns to Gold)"	4:18
13.	"Warble Womb II"	2:20
14.	"This Song Is Over"	9:37
15.	"September"	4:03
