= I'm So Tired (Fugazi song) =

Song by Fugazi

from the album Instrument Soundtrack
- Released: March 23, 1999
- Genre: Pop; emo
- Length: 1:59
- Label: Dischord
- Producer: Fugazi

"I'm So Tired" is a song by the American post-hardcore band Fugazi. Released on their 1999 album Instrument Soundtrack, the song is a piano ballad played and sung by vocalist Ian MacKaye, a departure from the band's typical post-hardcore output.

Commentators have described the song's lyrics as pertaining to depression and suicidal ideation.

== Reception ==
In her review of Instrument Soundtrack, Amy Sciarretto of CMJ New Music Report wrote, "'I'm So Tired' stands out as the moody highlight of this quietly enveloping, unexpected release." Pitchfork's Brent DiCrescenzo referred to "I'm So Tired" as "A wonderfully surprising moment of [Instrument Soundtrack] ... Heart-breakingly beautiful (yes, beautiful), it shows that Fugazi have more talent than their genre can tolerate. Hopefully, the band will turn punk on punk itself and record more sweet pop songs."

== Cover versions ==
"I'm So Tired" has been covered by Fog Lake, Gengahr, Jennylee, Lala Lala, Ultimate Painting, and Eddie Vedder.

== Personnel ==
- Ian MacKaye – vocals, piano
- Brendan Canty – drums (credited, playing drums on wire brushes)
