= Stinking Lizaveta =

- Origin: Philadelphia
- Genres: Doom metal, stoner rock
- Years active: 1994–present
- Labels: Compulsiv, Tolotta, At a Loss, Monotreme, Exile On Mainstream
- Members: Yanni Papadopoulos; Alexi Papadopoulos; Cheshire Agusta
- Website: stinkinglizaveta.com

Stinking Lizaveta is a power trio from Philadelphia. MusicMight categorizes them as "doom jazz".

== History ==
Their 1996 debut album Hopelessness and Shame was recorded by Steve Albini. Albini was so impressed by them that he brought them to the All Tomorrow's Parties festival he co-curated in 2004.

The band's first two albums were on Compulsiv, and their third came out on Joe Lally's now-defunct Tolotta Records label; later releases have been on At a Loss Recordings in the US and Monotreme Record in UK and Europe. Their most recent release, 2012's 7th. Direction, was released via German label Exile On Mainstream.

Extensive touring included supporting Clutch on a 2005 US tour. They toured in the UK with Clutch and Corrosion of Conformity in 2006.

The band got its name from a character in the 1880 Russian novel The Brothers Karamazov by Fyodor Dostoevsky.

== Discography ==
=== Albums ===
- ...Hopelessness and Shame (1996 - Compulsiv)
- Slaughterhouse (1997 - Compulsiv)
- III (2001 - Tolotta Records)
- Caught Between Worlds (2004 - At a Loss/Monotreme)
- Scream of the Iron Iconoclast (2007 - At a Loss/Monotreme)
- Sacrifice and Bliss (2009 - At a Loss/Monotreme)
- 7th Direction (2012 - Exile on Mainstream Records)
- Journey to the Underworld (2017 - Translation Loss)
- Anthems and Phantoms (2023 - SRA Records)

=== Singles/EPs ===
- "Refinery / Crooked Teeth" 7-inch (1994 - Tolotta Records)
- "Sink" 7-inch (1994 - Egg Yolk Records)
- "Stinking Lizaveta / Hell Mach Four" split 7-inch (1996 - Mood Swing Records)
- "Regulator Watts / Stinking Lizaveta" split 7-inch (1998 - French Lick)
- "War of the Worlds" 7-inch (2001 - Tolotta Records)
- "Rights for Bicyclists" (2009 - At A Loss Recordings)
