= Get Evens =

Studio album by the Evens
- Released: November 6, 2006
- Recorded: June–July 2006
- Studio: Inner Ear Studios
- Genres: Indie rock, punk
- Length: 40:50
- Label: Dischord 160
- Producers: The Evens, Don Zientara

The Evens chronology
The Evens (2005)	Get Evens (2006)	2 Songs (2011)

Professional ratings
Aggregate scores
Source	Rating
Metacritic	71/100
Review scores
Source	Rating
AllMusic	4/5 stars
Alternative Press	3/5 stars
Cokemachineglow	80%
Mojo	3.5/5 stars
Ox-Fanzine	9/10
Pitchfork	7.8/10
Spin	3.5/5 stars
Stylus	B
Uncut	2/5 stars

Get Evens is the second album by indie/punk duo the Evens. It was released on November 6, 2006.

== Tracklist ==
All tracks are written by The Evens.

No.	Title	Length
1.	"Cut From the Cloth"	5:11
2.	"Everybody Knows"	4:33
3.	"Cache Is Empty"	4:27
4.	"You Fell Down"	3:12
5.	"Pushed Against the Wall"	3:34
6.	"No Money"	3:59
7.	"All You Find You Keep"	4:38
8.	"Eventually"	4:34
9.	"Get Even"	3:38
10.	"Dinner With the President"	3:04
Total length:		40:50

== Personnel ==
- Ian MacKaye – guitar, vocals
- Amy Farina – drums, vocals
