= Red Medicine =

Studio album by Fugazi
- Released: June 12, 1995
- Recorded: January–February 1995
- Studio: Inner Ear (Arlington, Virginia); Guilford House (Guilford, Connecticut)
- Genre: Post-hardcore; art rock
- Length: 43:48
- Label: Dischord
- Producer: Fugazi

Fugazi chronology
In on the Kill Taker (1993)	Red Medicine (1995)	End Hits (1998)

Red Medicine is the fourth studio album by the American post-hardcore band Fugazi, released on June 12, 1995, by Dischord Records. It is the band's most commercially successful album in regards to chart positions, as it peaked at No. 126 on the Billboard 200 and No. 18 on the UK Albums Chart.

== Background and recording ==
The group began work on Red Medicine in 1994, after touring in support of In on the Kill Taker. The writing of the album involved several months of jam sessions and recording at Guilford House, a secluded country estate located in Guilford, Connecticut. Unlike most Fugazi songs, which are written collectively during a jam, the opening track "Do You Like Me" was written by singer-guitarist Guy Picciotto and then fleshed out by the rest of the band.

The album's recording sessions took place from January to February 1995 at Inner Ear Studios in Arlington, Virginia. The band worked with the engineer Don Zientara, but did not choose to work with the producer Ted Niceley again. Fugazi opted to retreat from the in-your-face production values of In on the Kill Taker and instead worked to create an ambient sound which would display greater depth. To achieve this, the band handled the production themselves and, in doing so, became more confident with in-studio experimentation. Red Medicine opens with a tape recording made on a boombox with a condenser microphone, and according to Picciotto, several "practice pieces" are interspersed throughout. The effects of Fugazi's experimentation are evident in the incorporation of these short pieces, ("Do You Like Me", "Birthday Pony"), but also in the usage of instruments such as the clarinet (as heard on "Version"), and alternate tunings on songs such as "Latest Disgrace" and "By You".

== Music ==
On Red Medicine, Fugazi began to move into more experimental styles of music, including noise punk, psychedelia ("By You") and dub ("Version"). Despite the increasing experimentation, some tracks on the album "return to [the band's] more standard issue, hardcore roots," employing its trademark "soaring guitars". In the book Gimme Indie Rock, music journalist Andrew Earles assessed: "A hard left turn into weirder waters, Red Medicine is the sound of Fugazi using its deserved freedom and following various creative muses. This means much of the band's previous anger gets left behind, with sadder, more ambient-sounding tracks [such as "Forensic Scene"] and a greater pop sense taking over where outright journeys into experimental and retro-future visions don't." The album has been described as providing "a fresh take on what indie rock could do with guitars in 1995." According to Andy Kellman of AllMusic, the album "packs more rhythmic punch and shows more range [than In on the Kill Taker]. With more drive and playful goings-on, the arrangements sound much looser than on Kill Taker, while remaining just as gut-kicking and brainy." The album incorporates clarinet and sampling.

== Release ==
Professional ratings
Review scores
Source	Rating
AllMusic	4.5/5 stars
Chicago Tribune	3.5/4 stars
Encyclopedia of Popular Music	3/5 stars
The Great Rock Discography	6/10
MusicHound Rock	3/5
The Philadelphia Inquirer	3/4 stars
Rolling Stone	3.5/5 stars
The Rolling Stone Album Guide	4/5 stars
Spin	7/10
Uncut	8/10

=== Critical reception ===
The album was a critical success: Mark Kemp of Rolling Stone called the album "rock solid". Andy Kellman of AllMusic wrote, "With more drive and playful goings-on, the arrangements sound much looser than on Kill Taker, while remaining just as gut-kicking and brainy."

Publication	Country	Accolade	Year	Rank
Pitchfork	US	Top 100 Favorite Records of the 1990s	1999	64
Pitchfork	US	Top 100 Favorite Records of the 1990s	2003	42
LostAtSea	US	90 Albums of the 90s	2000	25
Music Underwater	US	Top 100 Albums 1990-2003	2004	85

=== Tour ===
Fugazi embarked on an extensive worldwide tour in support of the album, performing a total of 172 dates between March 1995 and November 1996.

== Legacy and influence ==
Dennis Lyxzén of Refused considers Red Medicine to be his favorite Fugazi album and admitted that the band were influenced by it while recording Songs to Fan the Flames of Discontent and The Shape of Punk to Come. Mike Sullivan of Russian Circles cited the album, alongside Shellac's At Action Park, as a major influence on his guitar-playing, noting that they "literally changed the way [he] looked at music". John Frusciante described the album as a "masterpiece". Pelican's Trevor de Brauw included Red Medicine among the 10 albums that influenced his guitar-playing, praising the harmonized guitar-leads on the track "Long Distance Runner," calling them "so sparse but...so emotionally effective. Paired with the lyrics, it packed a real wallop." Travis Shettel of Piebald listed Red Medicine as one of three albums (the others being Frame & Canvas by Braid and Here's Where the Strings Come In by Superchunk) that had a profound influence on their music-making, even admitting that they "stole more bits and pieces and ideas from these three albums than I would like to admit."

Swedish hardcore punk band Refused covered the song "Bed for the Scraping".

== Track listing ==
All tracks are written by Fugazi.

No.	Title	Lead vocals	Length
1.	"Do You Like Me"	Picciotto	3:16
2.	"Bed for the Scraping"	MacKaye	2:50
3.	"Latest Disgrace"	Picciotto	3:34
4.	"Birthday Pony"	MacKaye	3:08
5.	"Forensic Scene"	Picciotto	3:05
6.	"Combination Lock"		3:06
7.	"Fell, Destroyed"	Picciotto	3:46
8.	"By You"	Lally	5:11
9.	"Version"		3:20
10.	"Target"	Picciotto	3:32
11.	"Back to Base"	MacKaye	1:45
12.	"Downed City"	Picciotto	2:53
13.	"Long Distance Runner"	MacKaye	4:17
Total length:			43:48

== Personnel ==
- Ian MacKaye – guitar, vocals
- Guy Picciotto – guitar, clarinet, vocals
- Joe Lally – bass, vocals
- Brendan Canty – drums

Technical

- Jem Cohen – cover art, photography
- Fugazi – cover art, mixing, photography, primary artist
- Joey P. – photography
- Don Zientara – engineer

== Charts ==
Red Medicine (1995)
Chart	Position
UK Albums (OCC)	18
US Billboard 200	126
US Heatseekers Albums (Billboard)	2
