= The Warmers =

American post-hardcore band

- Origin: Washington, D.C., United States
- Genres: Indie rock; post-hardcore
- Years active: 1994–1997
- Labels: Dischord Records
- Past members: Amy Farina; Juan Luis Carrera; Alec MacKaye

The Warmers were an American post-hardcore band based in Washington, D.C., United States, active from 1994 to 1997. The band was a trio featuring former Faith vocalist Alec MacKaye (guitar and vocals), Juan Luis Carrera (bass and vocals), and Amy Farina (drums), the Warmers recorded for the Washington, D.C.–based record label Dischord Records. Their self-titled album The Warmers, released in February 1996, was praised for its minimalism and Farina's "furious" drumming.

"The thing that really knocked me out is the not-drumming in her drumming, where she doesn't bang where she's supposed to, and holds off, and then puts it in", said MacKaye of Farina's style. "The rhythm is just too awesome. Had we gotten a hot-shot guitar player, they might want to rock the guitar a little too hard, and we’d lose the attention to the rhythm."

An EP entitled Wanted: More was released posthumously in May 2004 and features six songs recorded in December 1996. "Poked It with a Stick", originally from their album The Warmers, is featured on the three-CD compilation album 20 Years of Dischord. Farina would go on to form the Evens and Coriky with Alec's brother and her husband Ian MacKaye.

== Discography ==
- "Thin Air / Occupation: Fish" 7" single (1995)
- The Warmers CD/LP (1996)
- Wanted: More CD (2004)
