= The Dirty Girls Social Club =

2003 novel by Alisa Valdes-Rodriguez

- Author: Alisa Valdes-Rodriguez
- Publisher: St. Martin's Press
- Publication date: 2003
- Pages: 320
- ISBN: 0-312-31381-0

The Dirty Girls Social Club is a 2003 novel by Alisa Valdes-Rodriguez. Valdes-Rodriguez later wrote a sequel titled Dirty Girls on Top, which was published in 2008. The book is also credited with launching a new movement in Chicano literature and inspiring a series of "chick lit" novels about Latina women dubbed "Chica lit."

== Plot summary ==
The Dirty Girls Social Club is told in first person narration with the narration switching between six friends who all met in college: Lauren, Usnavys, Rebecca, Sara, Elisabeth and Amber. The friends have different racial and ethnic backgrounds, but find common ground due to their mutual Latina heritage and have nicknamed themselves the sucias (meaning dirty girls in Spanish) as a joke.

The novel begins with the women reuniting for one of their regular scheduled meetings. Lauren, who works as a reporter for the Boston Globe, is struggling with an eating disorder and a noncommittal boyfriend but believes that the other women have their lives together. Rebecca, who runs a successful magazine aimed at Latina women called Ella, is struggling in her relationship with her unemployed, white, pseudo-liberal husband, Brad. Sara is hiding the fact that her marriage to her childhood sweetheart Roberto is not what it seems and that he has been growing increasingly erratic and violent. Amber, chasing her dreams of becoming a prominent activist musician, changes her name to Cuicatl. Usnavys grows disenchanted with her boyfriend Juan who cannot afford to shower her with the luxuries she desires. Meanwhile, Elisabeth, a successful news reporter, who has been hiding the fact that she is in love with Lauren, falls in love with another woman.

Eventually Elisabeth is outed after a tabloid journalist catches her kissing a woman. The other sucias rally around her but Sara’s husband Roberto forces her to break off the friendship out of jealousy. When Elisabeth goes to Sara’s house to beg her for help from the paparazzi storm the two friends reunite. When Roberto discovers that Elisabeth has been to their home he assaults Sara and kicks her in the stomach causing her to miscarry.

All the sucias minus Sara and Cuicatl (who is touring) meet in order to decide how best to offer Sara their support. Lauren and Rebecca end up fighting, with Lauren accusing Rebecca of being judgmental and Rebecca admitting that her marriage is terrible and that she’s fallen in love with Andre, the black British man who is helping to finance her magazine. Usnavys′ boyfriend Juan crashes the dinner and proposes to Usnavys. She accepts.

Meanwhile, Lauren has broken up with her boyfriend after discovering that he’s cheating on her. She meets Amaury, who works as a drug dealer to support his family. She helps him get a job working for Cuicatl as part of her street team.

The novel closes six months after the start of the book with Usnavys married, Rebecca engaged, Cuicatl, Lauren and Elisabeth in relationships and Sara single but in recovery having launched her own interior design business.

== Reception ==
Upon its release, The Dirty Girls Social Club received positive reviews from critics. Reviewing the novel for Entertainment Weekly, Clarissa Cruz gave the book an A−, calling it a "compulsive beach read" and "a fun, breezy book."

== Adaptations ==
In 2010, Valdes-Rodriguez vocally opposed a planned television adaptation of her novel. She expressed disapproval of the adaptation, which was being developed for NBC, for changing the races of several of the characters, and over-sexualizing many characters. The adaptation was later scrapped.

In 2013, Valdes-Rodrigues began to raise funds for a movie adaptation of the book through a Kickstarter campaign. Before funding was completed, the project was canceled and moved to Fundly.

In 2016, Starz announced a television series based on the novel.
