= We Three Kings (disambiguation) =

"We Three Kings" is a Christmas carol written by the Reverend John Henry Hopkins, Jr.

We Three Kings may also refer to:

- We Three Kings (The Reverend Horton Heat album)
- We Three Kings (The Roches album)
- We Three Kings (The Bob and Tom Show album)

== See also ==
- We the Kings, an American rock band
