= Dead Meadow (album) =

Studio album by Dead Meadow
- Released: 2000
- Recorded: End of 1999
- Studio: Mobile Mystic Gnome Studio
- Genre: Psychedelic rock, stoner rock, acid rock
- Length: 44:42
- Label: Tolotta Records; Planaria Records; Xemu Records

Dead Meadow chronology
Dead Meadow (2000)	Howls from the Hills (2001)

Professional ratings
Review scores
Source	Rating
AllMusic	4/5 stars

Dead Meadow is the debut studio album by American psychedelic rock/stoner rock band Dead Meadow. It was released in 2000 by Tolotta Records on CD and by Planaria Records on LP. It was re-issued with an untitled bonus track in 2006 by Xemu Records. This album was recorded for only a couple hundred dollars in the band's practice space.

== Track listing ==
1. "Sleepy Silver Door" – 7:31
2. "Indian Bones" – 6:39
3. "Dragonfly" – 3:50
4. "Lady" – 4:30
5. "Greensky Greenlake" [Instrumental] – 4:33
6. "Beyond the Fields We Know" – 9:31
7. "At the Edge of the Wood" – 3:34
8. "Rocky Mountain High" – 4:34
9. "untitled" – 1:51 [bonus with re-issue]

== Personnel ==
Dead Meadow

- Jason Simon – guitar, vocals
- Steve Kille – bass, cover art
- Mark Laughlin – drums

Additional personnel

- Shelby Cinca – recording engineer
- Brian McTernan – mixer (original release)
- Tom Gloady – remixer (2006 reissue)
- Greg Calbi – mastering (2006 reissue)
