= Amy Farina =

American musician

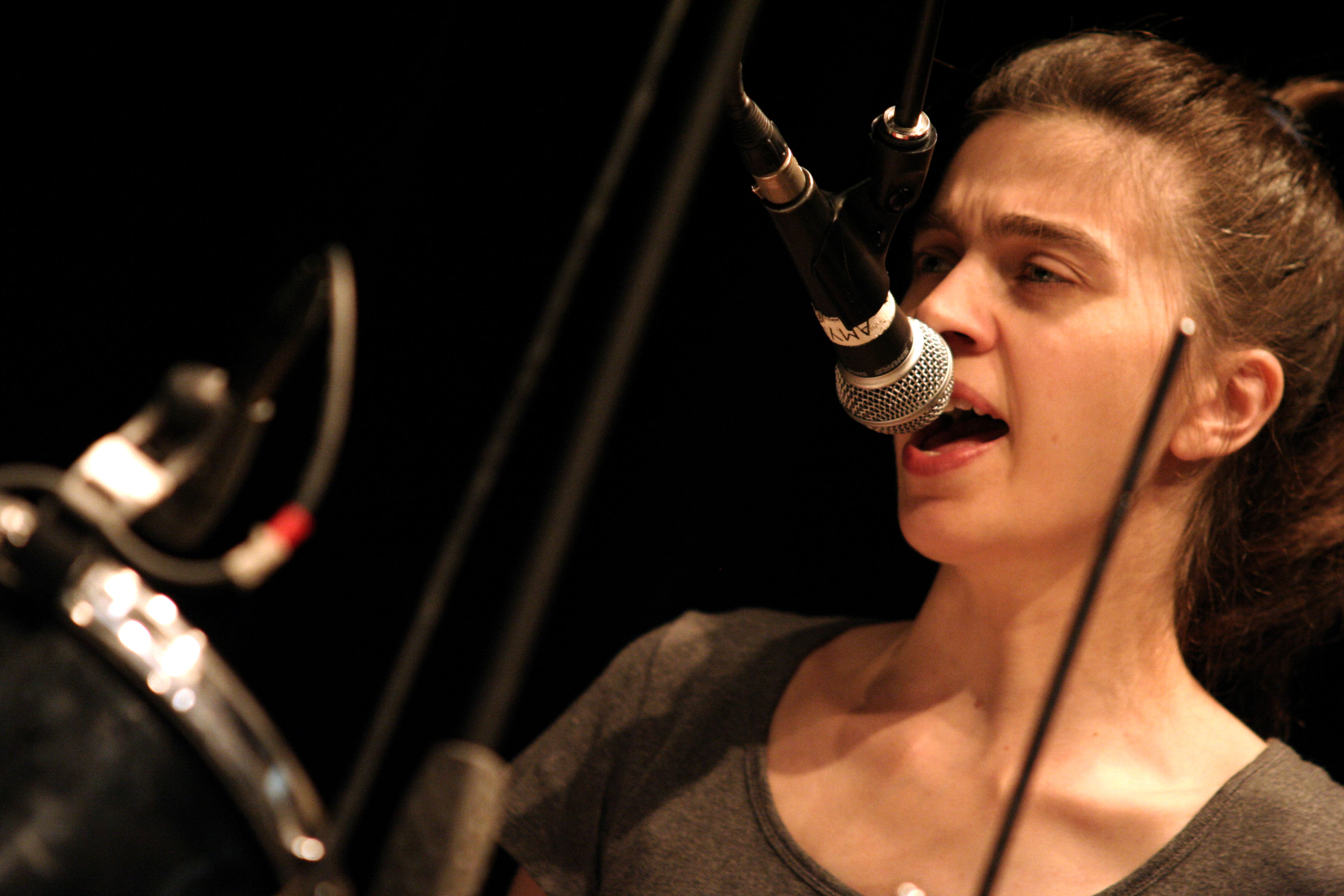

Background information
- Occupations: Singer, musician
- Instruments: Vocals; drums

Amy Farina is an American musician who is the drummer and singer in the indie rock duo The Evens, which includes her husband, Ian MacKaye.

== Career ==
Farina has played in The Warmers (which included Ian's younger brother Alec MacKaye), Mister Candy Eater, Ted Leo & the Pharmacists and with Lois Maffeo.

=== The Evens ===
Farina and Ian MacKaye formed The Evens in 2001. Farina sings and plays drums with MacKaye playing baritone guitar and sharing vocal duties. The Evens released their self-titled album in early 2005, breaking a three-year silence by MacKaye. Their second album, Get Evens, was released in November 2006. Their most recent album,The Odds, was released on November 20, 2012.

=== Coriky ===
In 2015, Farina and MacKaye began playing music with Joe Lally (Fugazi, The Messthetics). In 2018, the group played their first show, now with the adopted moniker Coriky. During early 2020, Coriky released two songs, "Clean Kill" and "Too Many Husbands", via various free streaming services. Although the self-titled album was originally set for release on March 27, 2020, the COVID-19 lockdown enacted during March 2020 delayed the release until June 12, 2020.

== Personal life ==
She and MacKaye have a child born in 2008.

She is the sister of Geoff Farina of the band Karate.
