= The Evens =

Indie rock band from Washington

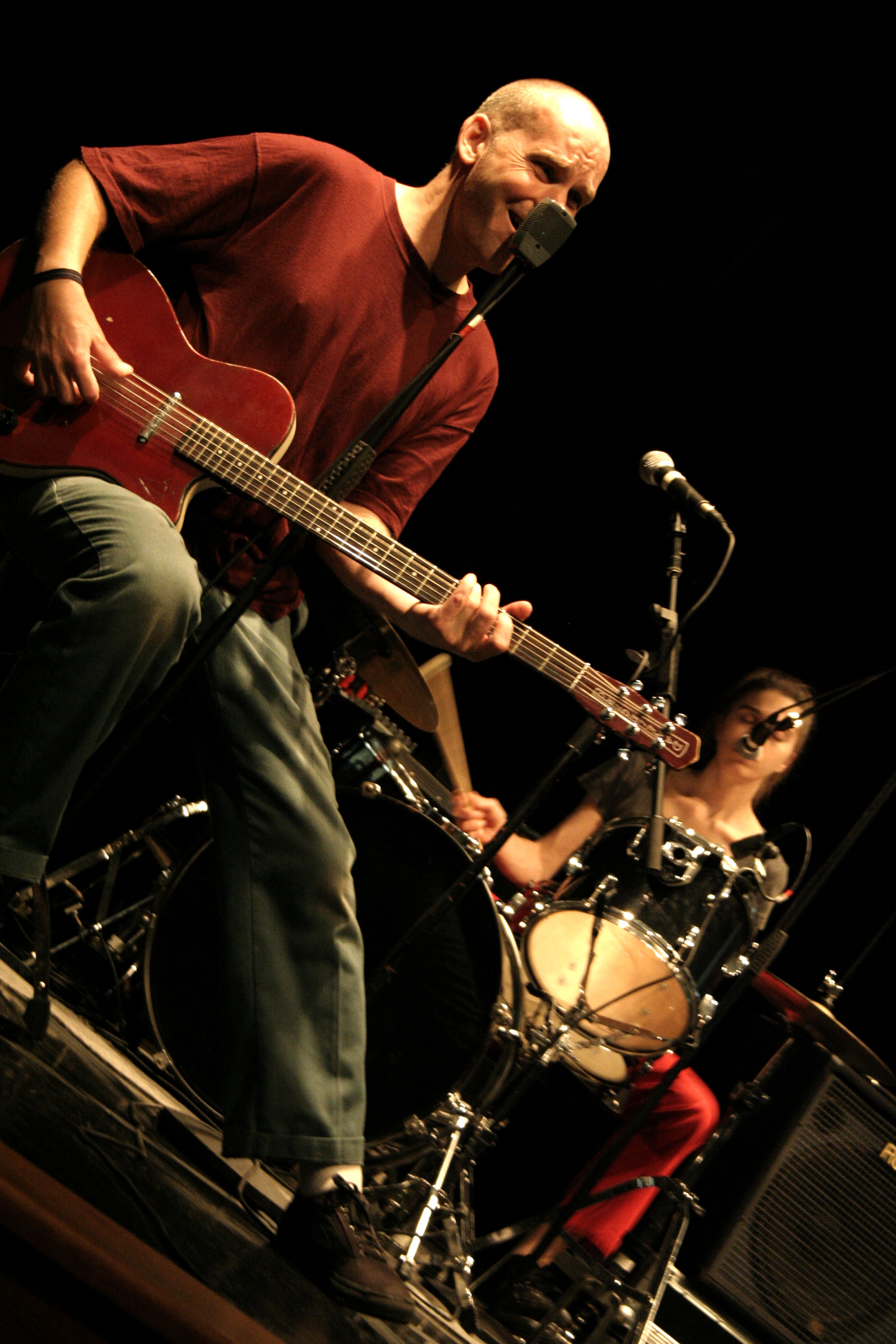

Background information
- Origin: Washington, D.C., United States
- Genres: Indie rock, punk rock
- Years active: 2001–present
- Label: Dischord
- Member of: Coriky
- Formerly of: Fugazi, The Warmers
- Members: Amy Farina; Ian MacKaye
- Website: The Evens

The Evens are an American indie rock duo, comprising Ian MacKaye (baritone guitar, vocals) and Amy Farina (drums, vocals). Formed in Washington, D.C. in 2001 after MacKaye's band Fugazi entered a hiatus, the Evens began practicing extensively, and eventually played a few shows and recorded a self-titled album, released in March 2005 on MacKaye's label, Dischord Records. The Evens are known for their unusual choices in venues for performances and the stylistic change from what many have dubbed the "D.C." or "Dischord" sound. The Washington Post has described the sound as "what happens when post-hardcore becomes post-post-hardcore".

== History ==
The Evens first gained notice in late 2003 when they created a video for their original children's song "Vowel Movement", which was made for Pancake Mountain, a Washington, D.C. internet-based children's program. The clip fueled furthered rumors of Fugazi's breakup amid their hiatus, while adding speculation as to MacKaye's new musical direction. The song featured sing-along lines and upbeat music in the vein of Sesame Street and other children's educational programs, while the video showed dancing children and colorful vowels.

In June and July 2006, MacKaye and Farina recorded new music that they wrote earlier in that year. On November 6, 2006, they released their second album entitled Get Evens, which featured this new music.

The band released their last album The Odds on November 20, 2012. The album was listed 45th on Stereogum's list of top 50 albums of 2012.

== Discography ==
- The Evens LP (2005)
- Get Evens LP (2006)
- 2 Songs 7" (2011)
- The Odds LP (2012)
