= The Messthetics =

Jazz punk group

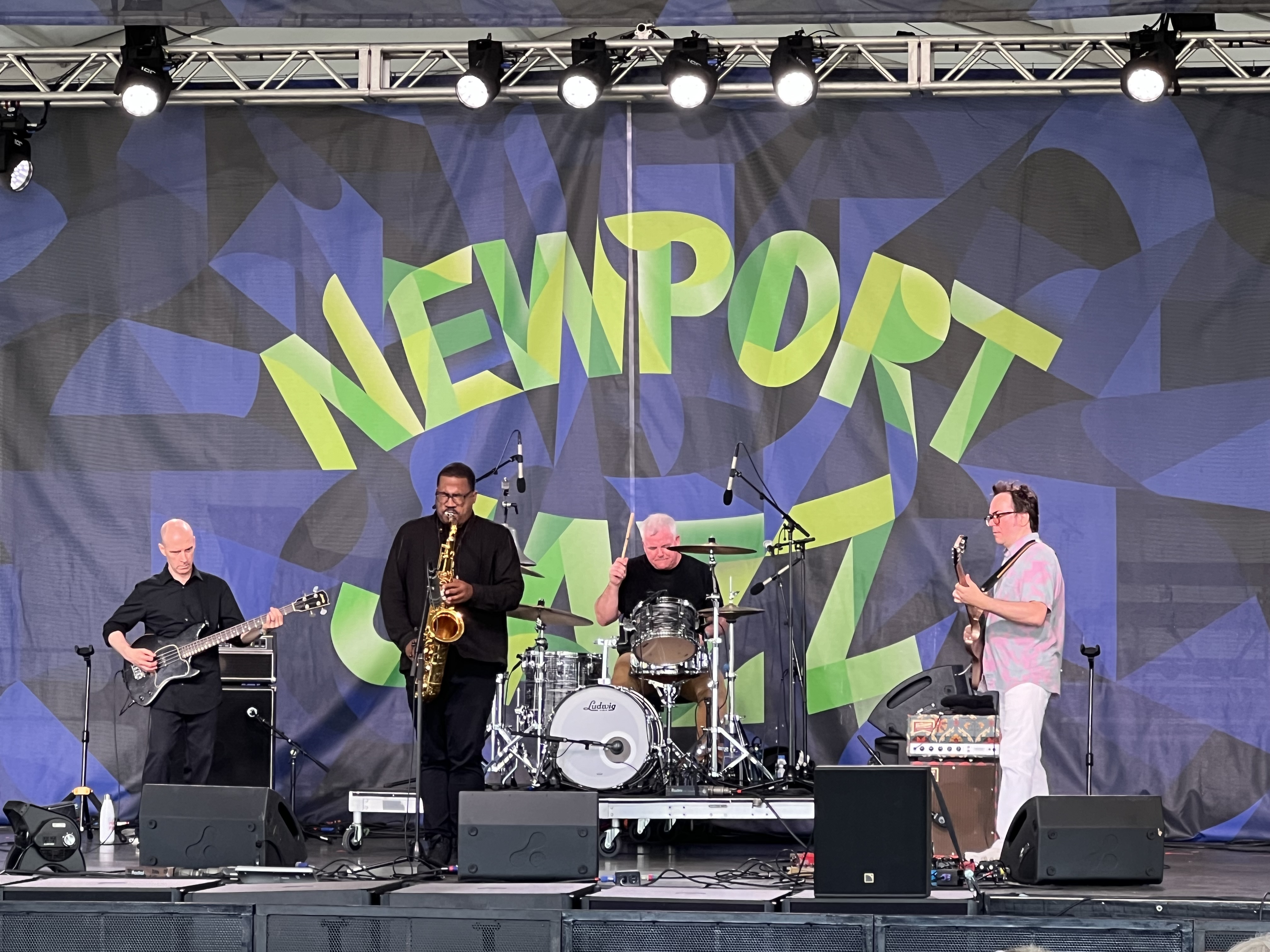
- The Messthetics and James Brandon Lewis performing at Newport Jazz Festival, 2024

Background information
- Origin: Washington, D.C., U.S.
- Genres: Post-hardcore; art punk; experimental rock; jazz fusion; progressive rock
- Years active: 2016–present
- Label: Dischord
- Members: Joe Lally; Brendan Canty; Anthony Pirog
- Website: themessthetics.bandcamp.com

The Messthetics is an American musical group founded by bassist Joe Lally and drummer Brendan Canty of Fugazi, along with guitarist Anthony Pirog. Their music is entirely instrumental and has been described as "jazz punk jam."

== History ==
Lally was a founding member of the influential underground punk band Fugazi in 1986, while Canty joined in '87. Fugazi went on an extended hiatus in 2003, though the band's four members remained friends and occasionally had casual gatherings where they performed music privately.

Lally had been living in Rome and upon returning to Washington, D.C., he hooked back up with Canty and played some solo recordings for the drummer. Canty suggested Pirog join them as he had previously been impressed by the guitarist. When the three started jamming they clicked as a band and Pirog invited the other two to be his rhythm section for a planned project with John Zorn's Tzadik Records. They didn't end up recording for Tzadik as at their first show Fugazi member Ian MacKaye was impressed enough to offer them a spot on Dischord Records.

The band's first album, eponymously entitled The Messthetics, was released by Dischord in 2018. It was recorded live in Canty’s practice room. Their follow-up album, Anthropocosmic Nest, was released on September 6, 2019. by Dischord Records. The album was featured in Bandcamp's "The Best Punk on Bandcamp" for September 2019.

== Discography ==
- The Messthetics (Dischord 2018)
- Anthropocosmic Nest (Dischord 2019)
- The Messthetics and James Brandon Lewis (Impulse! 2024, with James Brandon Lewis)
- Deface the Currency (Impulse! 2026), with James Brandon Lewis)
