= Girls Against Boys discography =

- Studio albums: 8
- Soundtrack albums: 1
- Compilation albums: 1
- Singles: 13
- Music videos: 6

American post-hardcore band Girls Against Boys has released six full-length studio albums, two studio EPs, and numerous singles.

Girls Against Boys initially released the EP Nineties vs. Eighties in 1990. It was followed up by their first actual full-length album, Tropic of Scorpio, in 1992. After signing to the label Touch and Go Records, they released a trilogy of albums which consisted of 1993's Venus Luxure No. 1 Baby, 1994's Cruise Yourself (which contained their first charting single "(I) Don't Got a Place"), and 1996's House of GVSB. The band then signed to the major label Geffen Records and released the album Freak*on*ica in 1998, which spawned their most successful single "Park Avenue". After departing from the label, they released the 2002 album You Can't Fight What You Can't See, and it was the band's final full-length album since they entered a period of sporadic activity afterwards. Girls Against Boys eventually released the EP entitled The Ghost List in 2013.

In addition to the eight main releases, Girls Against Boys released various other singles and outside contributions. The non-album single "Sexy Sam" in 1994 had contained one song from each of their prior albums up to that point, their Joy Division cover "She's Lost Control" was released as a standalone single in 1995, a promotional compilation by Geffen Records titled Fuse the Power of Now was released in 1998, and Girls Against Boys contributed to the majority of the soundtrack to the film Series 7: The Contenders in 2001.

== Albums ==
=== Studio albums ===
Year	Album details	Peak chart positions	
Year	Album details	US Heat.	UK
1992	Tropic of Scorpio: Released: December 2, 1992; Label: Adult Swim; Format: CD, CS, LP	—	—
1993	Venus Luxure No. 1 Baby: Released: August 20, 1993; Label: Touch and Go; Format: CD, CS, LP	—	—
1994	Cruise Yourself: Released: October 3, 1994; Label: Touch and Go; Format: CD, CS, LP	—	—
1996	House of GVSB: Released: March 5, 1996; Label: Touch and Go; Format: CD, CS, LP	—	76
1998	Freak*on*ica: Released: June 2, 1998; Label: DGC/Geffen; Format: CD, CS, LP	11	182
2002	You Can't Fight What You Can't See: Released: May 14, 2002; Label: Jade Tree; Format: CD, CS, LP	—	—
"—" denotes a release that did not chart.

=== Compilation albums ===
Year	Album details
1998	Fuse the Power of Now: Released: 1998; Label: DGC; Format: CD

=== Soundtrack albums ===
Year	Album details
2001	Series 7: The Contenders: Released: 2001; Label: Koch; Format: CD

== EPs ==
Year	EP details
1990	Nineties vs. Eighties: Released: 1990; Label: Adult Swim Records; Format: CD, CS, LP
2013	The Ghost List: Released: September 24, 2013; Label: Epitonic; Format: CD, LP

== Singles ==
Year	Song	Peak chart positions		Album
Year	Song	US Main.	UK	Album
1993	"Bullet Proof Cupid"	—	—	Venus Luxure No. 1 Baby
1994	"Sexy Sam"	—	—	non-album single
1994	"Red Bar"	—	—	non-album single
1994	"(I) Don't Got a Place"	—	91	Cruise Yourself
1995	"Kill the Sexplayer"	—	—	Cruise Yourself
1995	"She's Lost Control"	—	98	A Means to an End: The Music of Joy Division
1996	"Super-Fire"	—	82	House of GVSB
1996	"Disco Six Six Six"	—	—	House of GVSB
1998	"Park Avenue"	28	83	Freak*on*ica
1998	"Roxy"	—	—	Freak*on*ica
1998	"Psycho-Future"	—	—	Freak*on*ica
1999	"Cowboy's Orbit"	—	—	Freak*on*ica
2002	"Basstation"	—	—	You Can't Fight What You Can't See
"—" denotes a release that did not chart.

== Music videos ==
- "Bullet Proof Cupid" (1993)
- "(I) Don't Got a Place" (1994)
- "Kill the Sexplayer" (1995)
- "She's Lost Control" (1995)
- "Super-Fire" (1996)
- "Park Avenue" (1998)
- "Basstation" (2002)

== Other appearances ==
Compilation albums

- Chairman of the Board: Interpretations of Songs Made Famous by Frank Sinatra (Grass Records, 1993)
- Enragez Vous (Black and Noir Records, 1993)
- The Day We Killed Grunge (Caroline Records, 1994)
- Elements of Mammoth (Mammoth Records, 1994)
- Jabberjaw: Good to the Last Drop (Mammoth Records, 1994)
- Guinea Worm (S&M/TJ's Newport, 1994)
- The Day We Exhumed Disco (Caroline Records, 1995)
- Life Is Too Short for Boring Music (EFA, 1995)
- PIAS s'Enrage (Rage/PIAS, 1995)
- A Means to an End: The Music of Joy Division (Virgin Records, 1995)
- Introducing Vol. 4 (Indigo, 1996)
- Kerrang! Welcome to Planet Rock (Roadrunner Records, 1996)
- Studio Brussels '96 (Double T Music, 1996)
- Fuji Rock Festival '97 (TGCS, 1997)
- Everything Is Beautiful (Geffen Records, 1997)
- Vox Spring Collection (Vox, 1998)
- Pinkpop 1998 Sampler (Universal Records, 1998)
- Primal Screen (Upfront, 2001)
- 2002 Mordam Sampler (Mordam Records, 2002)
- Touch and Go 25 (Touch and Go, 2006)
- Occupy This Album (Music for Occupy, 2012)
- This Is a Call! (Mojo, 2020)

Soundtracks

- Clerks (Kevin Smith, 1994)
- Mallrats (Kevin Smith, 1995)
- SubUrbia (Richard Linklater, 1996)
- Love God (Frank Grow, 1997)
- Permanent Midnight (David Veloz, 1998)
- Psycho (Gus Van Sant, 1998)
- 200 Cigarettes (Risa Bramon Garcia, 1999)
- Blast (Martin Schenk, 2000)
- Terror Firmer (Lloyd Kaufman, 2000)
- Hedwig and the Angry Inch (John Cameron Mitchell, 2001)
- White Oleander (Peter Kosminsky, 2002)
- Rocked with Gina Gershon (Seth Jarrett, 2004)

Video games

- Test Drive Off-Road 3 (PC/PlayStation, 1999)
- Amped 2 (Xbox, 2003)
- Need for Speed: The Run (PC/Xbox 360/PlayStation 3, 2011)
