= Scott McCloud (Singer and Guitarist) =

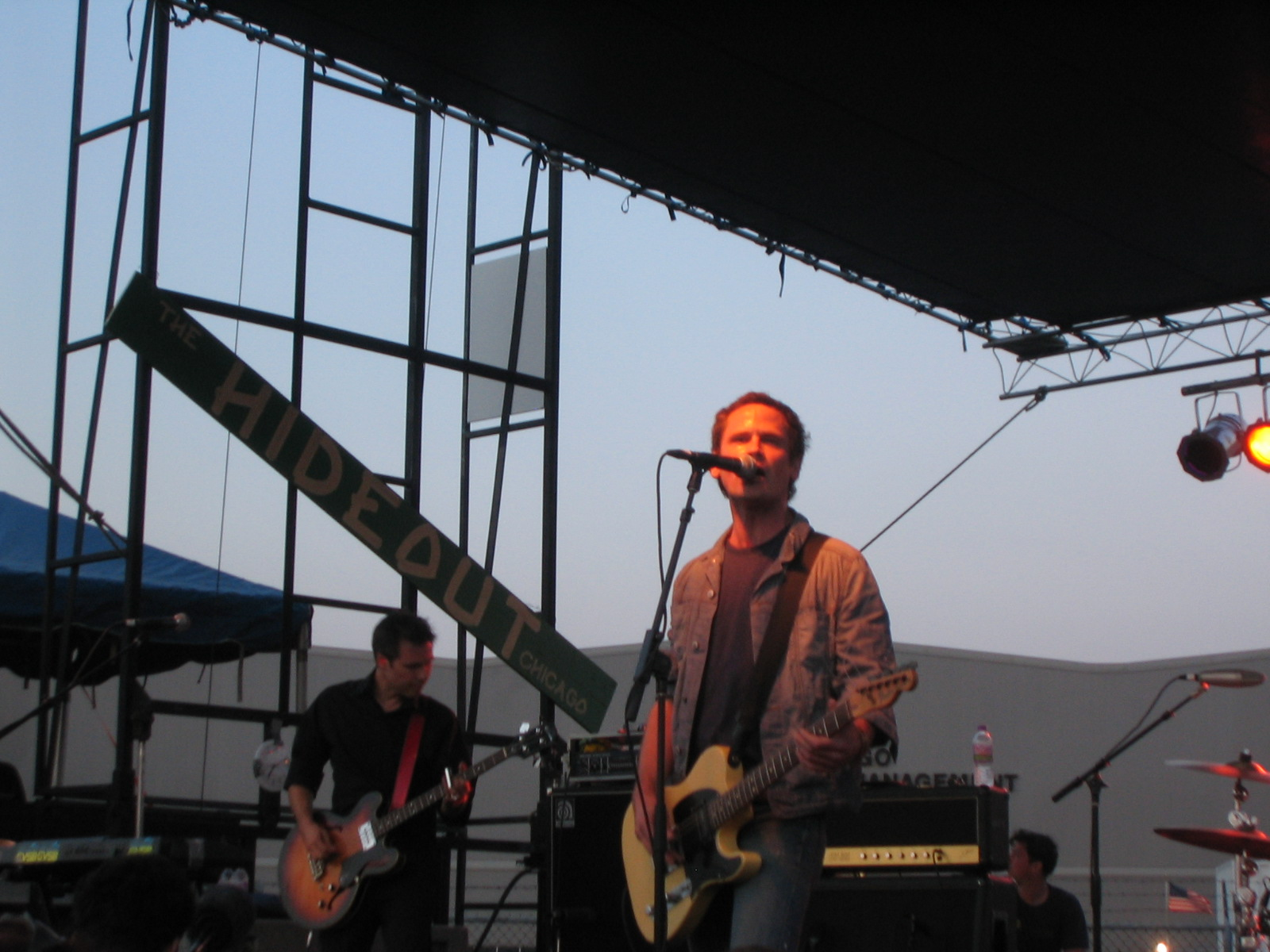

Background information
- Occupation: Musician
- Years active: 1986-present
- Member of: Soulside Girls Against Boys Paramount Styles

Scott McCloud is an American musician based in Vienna, Austria. He is the lead vocalist and guitarist in the post-hardcore band Girls Against Boys, New Wet Kojak, Paramount Styles and Soulside. He released a solo record in 2026, Make It To Forever.

== Early life and education ==
As a kid growing up in the 1970s in Washington DC, McCloud listened to his classic rock on his transistor radio while on his paper route, delivering the Washington Post. McCloud attended Woodrow Wilson High School, graduating in 1985. As a teen, he got into the DC/Dischord scene and hardcore music like Minor Threat, Bad Brains, Black Flag.

In 1989, McCloud was accepted to New York University Tisch School of the Arts, for the film program.

== Band histories ==
=== Soulside/Lunchmeat ===
McCloud met Bobby Sullivan and Chris Thomson while in high school, during the summer of 1983. They formed the band, Lunchmeat. Sullivan was on vocals, McCloud was on lead guitar, Thomson was on bass and Alexis Fleisig on drums. They played their last show on August 29, 1984. In 1985, Johnny Temple replaced Thomson on bass, and the band renamed themselves as Soulside. The group went on hiatus while the members went to college in 1989. They reformed in 2014.

For McCloud's 50th birthday on November 5, 2017, Soulside celebrated the milestone with a show in Prague, along with McCloud's other bands, Girls Against Boys and Paramount Styles.

=== Girls Against Boys ===
McCloud, Temple, Fleisig and Eli Janney formed GVSB in 1991. In 2022, McCloud told RiotFest that New York is the nineties was the "best place to live". McCloud also notes that "The almost constant fear of violence in the 90s NYC plays into our music".

By the time they were working on the 2013 EP, The Ghost List, McCloud was living full-time in Vienna, Austria.

=== New Wet Kojak ===
New Wet Kojak was a side project for McCloud and Temple. They were joined by Geoff Turner on lead guitar and keyboards, Charles Bennington on saxophone, and drummer Nick Pelliciotto from Edsel and Nathan Larson from Shudder to Think on trumpet and horns. Trouser Press called New Wet Kojak an "indulgence at best". They reunited in 2023 for three East Coast shows.

=== Paramount Styles ===
McCloud formed Paramount Styles in 2008. Joining McCloud was drummer Alexis Fleisig, Richard Fortus, Geoff Sanoff, Simon Lenski, and John Schmersal. Angela McCluskey lent her vocals and Marlon Barry was on cello.

=== Solo project ===
McCloud's solo album, Make It to Forever, was recorded in Athens, Greece, at the Zero Gravity Studios with Dimitris Dimitriades as his producer. It was released in January, 2026 on God Unknown Records. It featured Jennifer Charles from Elysian Fields on the single "Come Around."

== Musical style and influences ==
McCloud cites Rites of Spring as influential on his early sound. He also noted that "the main thing for me was I didn't want to be a copy of someone I admired. I wanted to find myself somehow, in the music".

== Discography ==
PROJECT	YEAR	RELEASE	LABEL	NOTES	REF
SOULSIDE	1985	"Thanks" split single w/ Mission Impossible	Sammich	Released under the "Lunchmeat" name Re-released with the title Getting Shit for Growing up Different Dave Grohl was in Mission Impossible	
	1987	Less Deep Inside Keeps LP/CD	Sammich/Dischord co-release		
	1988	Trigger LP	Dischord		
	1989	"Bass" b/w "103"	Dischord	This was a 7-inch single	
	1989	Hot Bodi-Gram LP	Dischord	This was remastered in 2022	
	1999	Soon Come Happy CD	Dischord	A compilation of Trigger, "Bass" single, and Hot Bodi-Gram	
	2020	"This Ship" b/w "Madeleine Said"	Dischord	Digital EP comes with a third song, "Survival" This was released as a 7-inch single/digital EP	
	2022	Brief Moment in the Sun LP	Dischord		
GIRLS AGAINST BOYS	1990	Nineties vs. Eighties	Adult Swim	Adult Swim was the label of Minor Threat's Jeff Nelson	
	1992	Tropic of Scorpio	Adult Swim		
	1993	Venus Luxure No. 1 Baby	Touch and Go	This is GVSB's first release on Touch and Go	
	1994	Sexy Sam EP	Touch and Go		
	1994	Cruise Yourself	Touch and Go		
	1996	House of GVSB	Touch and Go		
	1998	Freak*on*ica	Geffen Records	This is GVSB's first release on a major label	
	2002	You Can't Fight What You Can't See	Jade Tree Records		
	2013	The Ghost List	Self-Released		
NEW WET KOJAK	1995	New Wet Kojak	Touch and Go		
	1997	Nasty International	Touch and Go		
	2000	Do Things	Beggars Banquet		
	2001	No. 4 EP	Beggars Banquet		
	2003	This Is the Glamorous	Beggars Banquet		
SCOTT MCCLOUD	2026	Make it to Forever	God Unknown Records		

== Personal ==
McCloud moved to Vienna, Austria in the early 2010s. He has two sons.
