= Sexy Sam =

EP by Girls Against Boys
- Released: May 16, 1994
- Recorded: December 1993
- Studio: Southern Studios, London
- Genre: Post-hardcore, indie rock
- Length: 22:06
- Label: Touch and Go
- Producer: Ted Niceley

Girls Against Boys chronology
Venus Luxure No. 1 Baby (1993)	Sexy Sam (1994)	(I) Don't Got a Place (1994)

Professional ratings
Review scores
Source	Rating
Allmusic	3/5 stars

Sexy Sam is a single and an EP by American post-hardcore band Girls Against Boys, released on May 16, 1994 by Touch and Go Records. The vinyl version was released as a single, with "Sexy Sam" on one side and "I'm From France" on the other side. The CD version, however, was released as a mini-compilation. It consisted of six tracks, the two aforementioned new recordings plus previously released songs, one from each era of the band: "Stay in the Car" from Nineties vs. Eighties, "My Night of Pleasure" from Tropic of Scorpio, "Rockets Are Red" from Venus Luxure No. 1 Baby, and "Sharkmeat" (also from the Venus Luxure No. 1 Baby era, used as a b-side to "Bulletproof Cupid").

== Track listing ==
All tracks are written by Girls Against Boys.

No.	Title	Length
1.	"Sexy Sam"	2:46
2.	"I'm From France"	2:46
3.	"Stay in the Car"	3:26
4.	"My Night of Pleasure (With the Mudjacking Contractors)"	4:24
5.	"Rockets Are Red"	5:01
6.	"Sharkmeat"	3:43

== Personnel ==
Adapted from the Sexy Sam liner notes.

Girls Against Boys

- Alexis Fleisig – drums
- Eli Janney – sampler, bass guitar, backing vocals
- Scott McCloud – lead vocals, guitar
- Johnny Temple – bass guitar

Production and additional personnel

- John Loder – engineering
- Ted Niceley – production

== Release history ==
Region	Date	Label	Format	Catalog
United States	1994	Touch and Go	CD, LP	TG129
