= Disco Six Six Six =

EP by Girls Against Boys
- Released: October 1, 1996
- Recorded: September 1995–December 1995
- Genre: Post-hardcore, indie rock
- Length: 16:55
- Label: Touch and Go
- Producer: Ted Niceley

Girls Against Boys chronology
House of GVSB (1996)	Disco Six Six Six (1996)	Freak*on*ica (1998)

Professional ratings
Review scores
Source	Rating
Allmusic	4/5 stars
Alternative Press	4/5 stars

Disco Six Six Six is a single and an EP by American post-hardcore band Girls Against Boys, released on October 1, 1996 by Touch and Go Records. "Disco Six Six Six" was the second single to promote House of GVSB, with "Super-fire" as the first. The public release had consisted of the title track in remastered form plus four additional songs. The four additional songs were not outtakes of House of GVSB, but were instead recorded after the album's sessions.

== Track listing ==
All tracks are written by Girls Against Boys.

No.	Title	Length
1.	"Disco Six Six Six"	2:46
2.	"Distracted (RVS #7)"	3:20
3.	"Do It Like Diamonds"	2:58
4.	"Black Leather"	4:08
5.	"Keep Yer Pants On"	3:43

== Personnel ==
Adapted from the Disco Six Six Six liner notes.

Girls Against Boys

- Alexis Fleisig – drums
- Eli Janney – keyboards, bass guitar, backing vocals, engineering, mixing
- Scott McCloud – lead vocals, guitar
- Johnny Temple – bass guitar

Production and additional personnel

- Dom Barbera – additional mixing
- Greg Calbi – mastering
- Wayne Dorell – additional engineering
- Rich Lamb – additional engineering
- Ted Niceley – production
- Mike Rippe – engineering
- Ken Tondre – Roland TR-808

== Release history ==
Region	Date	Label	Format	Catalog
United States	1996	Touch and Go	CD	TG166
