= Robert Sullivan =

Robert Sullivan may refer to:

- Robert Sullivan (judoka) (born 1949), British Olympic judoka
- Robert Sullivan (poet) (born 1967), Māori writer from New Zealand
- Robert Austin Sullivan (1947–1983), American man executed in Florida
- Robert Baldwin Sullivan (1802–1853), Canadian lawyer, judge, and the second mayor of Toronto
- Robert J. Sullivan Jr. (born 1945), American politician
- Robert "Sully" Sullivan, American radio and television personality, entrepreneur, and musician
- Robert M. Sullivan (born 1951), paleontologist
- Bob Sullivan (American football player) (Robert Joseph Sullivan, 1923–1981), American football player
- Robbie Sullivan, fictional character in the television series Modern Family
- Bobby Sullivan, musician and activist
- Robert Joseph Sullivan (educator) (1800–1868), Northern Irish educationalist, founder of Sullivan Upper School, author of English texts and dictionaries
- Robert Sullivan (reporter), associated with The New Yorker

== See also ==
- Bob Sullivan (disambiguation)
- Robert O'Sullivan (disambiguation)
