= Less Deep Inside Keeps =

Studio album by Soulside
- Released: 1987
- Recorded: August 1986 at Inner Ear Studios
- Genre: skate punk, post-punk, post-hardcore, melodic hardcore
- Length: 28:08
- Label: Sammich/Dischord Records
- Producer: Ian MacKaye, Don Zientara, Eli Janney

Soulside chronology
Less Deep Inside Keeps (1987)	Trigger (1988)

Less Deep Inside Keeps is the first full-length studio album recorded by Soulside as a Sammich/Dischord (sr02/DIS22½) joint release. It was recorded at Inner Ear Studios in Arlington, Va. by Don Zientara and produced by Ian MacKaye in 1986. Originally released on vinyl, it was rereleased by Dischord Records (sr02CD) in 2003 on cd. Actually untitled, the artwork on either side of the spine is often used to identify it. Full spine title "Becoming Less Less Deep To Be Inside Nothing Keeps." The original release featured a grey cover. Repressings included green, blue and yellow. The artwork was created by Cynthia Connolly, illustrations by Chris Thomson and cover photo by Scott McCloud. It is the only Soulside release to feature Chris Thomson on bass.

== Track listing ==
1. "Pearl to Stone" – 2:54
2. "One Step Higher" – 2:56
3. "Walking" – 2:05
4. "Don't Let Me Down" – 2:12
5. "You've Heard It Before" – 3:07
6. "Over and Out" – 2:22
7. "I Find the Other Side" – 3:28
8. "In Days to Come" – 2:38
9. "Dreams" – 3:02
10. "X-Lion Tamer" (Wire cover) — 1:36
11. "Fresh Air" – 2:35

== Personnel ==
- Alexis Fleisig – drums
- Scott McCloud – guitar
- Bobby Sullivan – vocals
- Chris Thomson – bass
