= (I) Don't Got a Place =

Single by Girls Against Boys

from the album Cruise Yourself
- B-side: "Man Ray of Love"
- Released: August 29, 1994
- Recorded: May 1994
- Studio: Oz Studios, Baltimore, MD
- Genre: Post-hardcore, indie rock
- Length: 8:16
- Label: Touch and Go
- Producer: Ted Niceley

Girls Against Boys singles chronology
"Sexy Sam" (1994)	"(I) Don't Got a Place" (1994)	"Cruise Yourself" (1994)

Professional ratings
Review scores
Source	Rating
Allmusic	2.5/5 stars

(I) Don't Got a Place is a single by American post-hardcore band Girls Against Boys, released on August 29, 1994 by Touch and Go Records.

== Track listing ==
All tracks are written by Girls Against Boys.

No.	Title	Length
1.	"(I) Don't Got a Place"	3:45
2.	"Man Ray of Love"	2:31

== Personnel ==
Adapted from the (I) Don't Got a Place liner notes.

Girls Against Boys

- Alexis Fleisig – drums
- Eli Janney – sampler, bass guitar, backing vocals
- Scott McCloud – lead vocals, guitar
- Johnny Temple – bass guitar

Production and additional personnel

- Ted Niceley – production

== Release history ==
Region	Date	Label	Format	Catalog
United States	1994	Touch and Go	CD, LP	TG137
