= Super-fire =

EP by Girls Against Boys
- Released: February 20, 1996
- Recorded: September 1995
- Studio: Water Music, Hoboken, NJ
- Genre: Post-hardcore, indie rock
- Length: 12:37
- Label: Touch and Go
- Producer: Ted Niceley

Girls Against Boys chronology
Kill the Sexplayer (1995)	Super-fire (1996)	House of GVSB (1996)

Professional ratings
Review scores
Source	Rating
AllMusic	2.5/5 stars

Super-fire is a single and an EP by American post-hardcore band Girls Against Boys, released in 1996 by Touch and Go Records. The title track was the first single from House of GVSB and it was followed by the second single "Disco Six Six Six". It was released in different configurations, such as a vinyl which only consisted of the title track, a CD which consisted of the title track and the b-side "If Glamour Is Dead", and a CD which consisted of the title track plus "Cash Machine" (also off of House of GVSB) and the non-album tracks "If Glamour Is Dead" and "Viva Roma Star".

The music video, featuring the band playing in and destroying a room made up of tungsten light bulbs, was deemed too violent for airplay on MTV at the time of release, forcing the band to re-edit the video.

== Critical reception ==
Spin called the title track "a post-rock-gone-hard-rock sonic manifesto." Billboard wrote that the song's "sophisticated groove and overlapping textures tip the hat to techno and trip-hop, but the attitude and invention are pure punk."

NPR included the song on its list of "100 Essential Noise Pop Songs."

== Track listing ==
All tracks are written by Girls Against Boys.

No.	Title	Length
1.	"Super-fire"	3:22
2.	"If Glamour Is Dead"	3:14
3.	"Cash Machine"	3:34
4.	"Viva Roma Star"	2:27

== Personnel ==
Adapted from the Super-fire liner notes.

Girls Against Boys

- Alexis Fleisig – drums
- Eli Janney – keyboards, bass guitar, backing vocals, engineering, mixing
- Scott McCloud – lead vocals, guitar
- Johnny Temple – bass guitar

Production and additional personnel

- Dom Barbera – additional engineering
- Greg Calbi – mastering
- Wayne Dorell – additional engineering
- Rich Lamb – additional engineering
- Ted Niceley – production, mixing
- Ken Tondre – Roland TR-808
- Andy Baker – assistant engineering

== Release history ==
Region	Date	Label	Format	Catalog
United States	1996	Touch and Go	CD, LP	TG160
