= Park Avenue (song) =

Single by Girls Against Boys

from the album Freak*on*ica
- Released: 1998
- Recorded: October 1997
- Studio: Baby Mountain Studios
- Genre: Industrial rock
- Length: 3:50
- Label: Geffen Records
- Producer(s): Nick Launay

Girls Against Boys singles chronology
"Disco Six Six Six" (1996)	"Park Avenue" (1998)	"Basstation" (2002)

"Park Avenue" is a song by post-hardcore band Girls Against Boys, released in 1998. It was the lead single from their album Freak*on*ica and is their only single to chart in the United States.

== Background ==
"Park Avenue" was released as the lead single from the band's 1998 album Freak*on*ica. The album was the band's first (and to date, only) album to be released on a major label, Geffen Records. Both the single and the overall album had an electronic-influenced sound, a departure from the post-hardcore genre that the band had mainly presented beforehand. The single of "Park Avenue" consisted of a remix of the song "Black Hole" (in which the original version was found on Freak*on*ica) in addition to the outtake track "EPR" (which also appeared on the soundtrack to the film Permanent Midnight).

In the U.S., the single peaked at No. 28 on the Mainstream Rock Tracks chart. It was the band's only appearance on a Billboard songs chart in the U.S.; however, the single peaked at No. 83 on the UK Singles Chart. In the UK, "Park Avenue" became the band's fourth and final appearance on the country's singles chart. A music video was produced for "Park Avenue" as well.

== Track listing ==
All tracks are written by Girls Against Boys.

No.	Title	Length
1.	"Park Avenue"	3:50
2.	"American White Dwarf" (Miami Bassomatic Remix)	4:40
3.	"EPR"	4:09

== Personnel ==
Girls Against Boys

- Alexis Fleisig – drums
- Eli Janney – keyboards, bass guitar, backing vocals, engineering, mixing
- Scott McCloud – lead vocals, guitar
- Johnny Temple – bass guitar

Production and additional personnel

- Nick Launay – production
- Mike Scielzi – mixing
- Greg Calbi – mastering

== Charts ==
Chart (1998)	Peak position
US Mainstream Rock Tracks	28
UK Singles Chart	83

== Release history ==
Region	Date	Label	Format	Catalog
United States	1998	Geffen Records	CD, LP	GFSTD 22335
