= Kill the Sexplayer =

EP by Girls Against Boys
- Released: February 13, 1995
- Recorded: May 1994
- Studio: Oz Studios, Baltimore, Maryland
- Genre: Post-hardcore, indie rock
- Length: 13:19
- Label: Touch and Go
- Producer: Ted Niceley

Girls Against Boys chronology
| Cruise Yourself (1994) | Kill the Sexplayer (1995) | Super-fire (1996) |

Professional ratings
Review scores
| Source | Rating |
|---|---|
| Allmusic | 4/5 stars |

Kill the Sexplayer is a single and an EP by American post-hardcore band Girls Against Boys, released on February 13, 1995 by Touch and Go Records. There were two versions released. The first version was a promotional single, mainly used to promote the song's appearance in the film Clerks, and had only consisted of one track. The second version was released as an EP, which consisted of the title track and three tracks recorded live on Bernard Lenoir's radio program.

== Track listing ==
All tracks are written by Girls Against Boys.

| No. | Title | Length |
|---|---|---|
| 1. | "Kill the Sexplayer" | 3:18 |
| 2. | "Learned It" (live) | 3:41 |
| 3. | "Sexy Sam" (live) | 2:56 |
| 4. | "Let Me Come Back" (live) | 3:25 |

== Personnel ==
Adapted from the Kill the Sexplayer liner notes.

Girls Against Boys

- Alexis Fleisig – drums
- Eli Janney – organ, vibraphone, bass guitar
- Scott McCloud – lead vocals, guitar
- Johnny Temple – bass guitar, sampler

Production and additional personnel

- Ted Niceley – production
- Jean-Philippe Thomas – engineering (2, 4)

== Release history ==
| Region | Date | Label | Format | Catalog |
|---|---|---|---|---|
| United States | 1995 | Touch and Go | CD | TG140 |
