= Paramount Styles =

- Origin: New York City, United States
- Genres: Indie rock, alternative rock
- Years active: 2007–present
- Label: Cycle/Konkurrent
- Members: Scott McCloud; Alexis Fleisig
- Website: paramountstyles.com

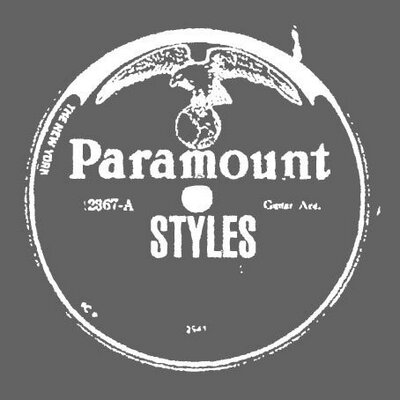
Paramount Styles logo

Paramount Styles is an American indie rock band from New York formed by Scott McCloud, guitarist of Girls Against Boys.

McCloud recorded the debut with Alexis Fleisig (Girls Against Boys), Richard Fortus (Guns N' Roses, The Psychedelic Furs) and some others. Live the band consisted of Alexis Fleisig, Geoff Sanoff (Edsel, Stratosphere) Simon Lenski (DAAU) playing cello, and Chris Smets (Star Club West) on lead guitar. In 2008, during the US tour John Schmersal (Enon) also participated as well as Geoff Sanoff, Jessica Billey, Michael Hampton and Julia Kent. In spring 2009, the band tours through Europe with guitarist CChhris 'The sound' Smet.

== Discography ==
=== Studio albums ===
- Failure American Style, (2008, Cycle/Konkurrent)
- Heaven's Alright, (2010, Cycle/Konkurrent)
- Distant Karma, (2018, Silver Rocket)

=== Split releases ===
- Start Burning 2 - Split 7 inch with Aran Epochal (2008, Silver Rocket)
