= House of GVSB =

Studio album by Girls Against Boys
- Released: March 5, 1996
- Recorded: September 1995
- Studio: Water Music, Hoboken, NJ
- Genre: Post-hardcore; indie rock
- Length: 40:11
- Label: Touch and Go
- Producer: Ted Niceley

Girls Against Boys chronology
Super-fire (1996)	House of GVSB (1996)	Disco Six Six Six (1996)

Singles from House of GVSB
- 1. "Super-Fire" Released: 1996; 2. "Disco Six Six Six" Released: 1996

House of GVSB is the fourth studio album by American post-hardcore band Girls Against Boys, released in 1996 by Touch and Go Records.

== Recording ==
House of GVSB was recorded in September 1995 at Water Music studios in Hoboken, New Jersey, United States.

== Reception ==
Professional ratings
Review scores
Source	Rating
AllMusic	4/5 stars
Alternative Press	3/5 stars
Entertainment Weekly	B+
NME	8/10
Pitchfork	7.3/10
Q	3/5 stars
Rolling Stone	3/5 stars
The Rolling Stone Album Guide	3/5 stars
Spin	9/10
The Village Voice	A−

House of GVSB has been generally well received by critics. It is the band's bestselling album, with over 70,000 copies having been sold worldwide by May 1998.

Ned Raggett of AllMusic wrote, "House of GVSB saw the band continuing its winning streak, and while arguably it contained no real surprises after the powerful one-two punch of Venus Luxure [No. 1 Baby] and Cruise Yourself, it still showed the quartet at the top of its considerable game."

=== Accolades ===
Year	Publication	Country	Accolade	Rank
1996	Spin	United States	"Albums of the Year"	5
1996	Rock de Lux	Spain	"Albums of the Year"	15
1996	Kerrang!	United Kingdom	"Albums of the Year"	20
1996	Magic	France	"Albums of the Year"	25
1996	Rock Sound	France	"Albums of the Year"	26
1996	Sounds	Germany	"Albums of the Year"	*
2000	LAS Magazine	United States	"90 Albums of the 90s"	42
2006	Rock Sound	France	"Top 150 Albums of Our Lifetime"	126
"*" denotes an unordered list.

== Track listing ==
All tracks are written by Girls Against Boys.

No.	Title	Length
1.	"Super-fire"	3:18
2.	"Click Click"	3:21
3.	"Crash 17 (X-Rated Car)"	3:23
4.	"Disco Six Six Six"	2:46
5.	"Life in Pink"	4:12
6.	"TheKindaMzkYouLike"	3:57
7.	"Vera Cruz"	4:28
8.	"AnotherDroneInMyHead"	3:40
9.	"Cash Machine"	3:33
10.	"Wilmington"	3:21
11.	"Zodiac Love Team"	4:05

== Personnel ==
Adapted from the House of GVSB liner notes.

Girls Against Boys

- Alexis Fleisig – drums
- Eli Janney – keyboards, bass guitar, backing vocals, engineering, mixing
- Scott McCloud – lead vocals, guitar
- Johnny Temple – bass guitar

Production and additional personnel

- Dom Barbera – additional mixing
- Greg Calbi – mastering
- Wayne Dorell – additional engineering
- Rich Lamb – additional engineering
- Ted Niceley – production
- Mike Rippe – engineering
- Ken Tondre – Roland TR-808

== Release history ==
Region	Date	Label	Format	Catalog
United States	1994	Touch and Go	CD, CS, LP	TG149
