= Bob Sullivan =

Bob Sullivan may refer to:

- Bob Sullivan (American football player) (1923–1981), walk-on offensive half back and defensive back
- Bob Sullivan (American football coach) (born c. 1937), American college football coach
- Bob Sullivan (basketball) (1921–2007), American basketball player
- Bob Sullivan (ice hockey) (1957–2018), Canadian ice hockey player
- Bob Sullivan (journalist) (born 1968), American online journalist
- Bob Sullivan (politician), American politician
- Bob Sullivan (rugby league) (1931–2009), Australian rugby league footballer

== See also ==
- Robert Sullivan (disambiguation)
