= The Ghost List =

EP by Girls Against Boys
- Released: September 24, 2013
- Genre: Post-hardcore, indie rock
- Length: 17:42
- Producer: Girls Against Boys

Girls Against Boys chronology
You Can't Fight What You Can't See (2002)	The Ghost List (2013)

Professional ratings
Review scores
Source	Rating
Allmusic	3.5/5 stars
Pitchfork Media	(7.0/10)

The Ghost List is an EP by American post-hardcore band Girls Against Boys which was released independently on September 24, 2013. The EP was recorded in New York and was released eleven years after their previous album from 2002.

The inspiration for the EP was some song ideas from 2003, from just after the group's final album, You Can't Fight What You Can't See, that Eli Janney rediscovered.

Stuart Berman of Pitchfork describes The Ghost List as "a successful reboot for a mothballed machine whose core components-- brawn, dissonance, and groove-- are shown to be still in fine working order. Sure, we’ve seen this movie before, but Girls Against Boys haven't forgotten the good parts."

== Track listing ==
All tracks are written by Girls Against Boys.

No.	Title	Length
1.	"It's a Diamond Life"	3:43
2.	"Fade Out"	2:24
3.	"60 > 15"	3:22
4.	"Let's Get Killed"	3:53
5.	"Kick"	4:20

== Personnel ==
Adapted from The Ghost List liner notes.

Girls Against Boys

- Alexis Fleisig – drums
- Eli Janney – keyboards, bass guitar, backing vocals
- Scott McCloud – lead vocals, guitar
- Johnny Temple – bass guitar

== Release history ==
Region	Date	Label	Format	Catalog
United States	2013	self-released	CD, LP	GVSB001
