= Akashic Books =

Book publisher based in New York

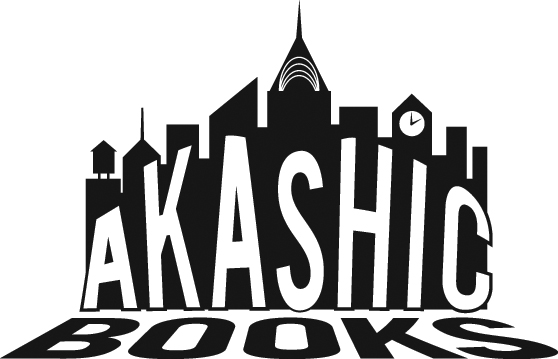
- Founded: 1997; 29 years ago
- Founder: Johnny Temple
- Country of origin: United States
- Headquarters location: Brooklyn, New York City
- Distribution: Consortium Book Sales & Distribution (US); Turnaround Publisher Services (UK)
- Publication types: Books
- Official website: www.akashicbooks.com

Akashic Books is a Brooklyn-based independent publisher, formed in 1997. It was started by Johnny Temple, bassist of Girls Against Boys and mid-'80s Dischord band Soulside, with the mission "to make literature more part of popular culture, not just a part of elitist culture."

Temple originally intended to start an independent record label, but decided that there were already many fine indie labels in operation, and was motivated by a friend's unpublished novel to create Akashic Books. Temple has cited Dischord and fellow indie label Touch and Go as inspirations, stating that he has been "hugely influenced by both of those companies in how I run the business."

Akashic Books' collection began with Arthur Nersesian's The Fuck Up in 1997, and has since expanded to include Dennis Cooper's Little House on the Bowery series, Chris Abani's Black Goat poetry series, and the internationally successful Noir series, originating with Brooklyn Noir, since expanding to international titles such as Delhi Noir and Havana Noir.

Akashic Books authors include T Cooper, Ron Kovic, Derek McCormack, Melvin Van Peebles, Ryan Adams, Lydia Lunch, Matthew Stokoe, Richard Hell, Nina Revoyr, Les Claypool, Pete Hamill, Carlos Pintado, Lawrence Block, Travis Jeppesen, James Greer, Joe Meno, Elizabeth Nunez, Adam Mansbach, and Greg Prato.

In June 2011, Akashic published the widely successful Go the Fuck to Sleep by Adam Mansbach. Go the Fuck to Sleep was subject to an unintended viral marketing campaign after PDF copies of the book, presumably from advance copies sent to booksellers, were distributed via email. While the book was originally scheduled for release in October 2011, by the end of April the book had hit #2 on Amazon.com's bestseller list, and by May 12 the book was #1. In the meantime, the publishing date was moved up to June, and Akashic increased its first printing to 150,000 copies. Akashic, which acknowledged the importance of social media in popularizing the book ("it's a miracle from the heavens for us"), is trying to prevent unauthorized copying of the book.

The publishing house is currently run out of the (OA) Can Factory in Brooklyn.
