= New Wet Kojak =

New Wet Kojak was an American indie rock band from New York City.

The group was formed when two members of Girls Against Boys, Scott McCloud and Johnny Temple, joined three other former residents of Washington, D.C., Geoff Turner (ex-Gray Matter), Nick Pellicciotto (ex-Edsel), and Charles Bennington (ex-High Back Chairs). The group released four full-length albums and an EP between 1995 and 2003 on the Touch and Go and the Beggars Banquet record labels.

In September 2023, they announced that in December they would play their first official shows in twenty years featuring their five-piece lineup.

== Members ==
- Scott McCloud - vocals
- Johnny Temple - bass
- Geoff Turner - guitar
- Nick Pellicciotto - drums
- Charles Bennington - saxophone

== Discography ==
- New Wet Kojak (Touch and Go, 1995)
- Nasty International (Touch and Go, 1997)
- Do Things (Beggars Banquet, 2000)
- No. 4 EP (Beggars Banquet, 2001)
- This Is the Glamorous (Beggars Banquet, 2003)
