= Left Bank (film) =

2008 Belgian horror film

- Original Belgian release poster
- Directed by: Pieter Van Hees
- Written by: Pieter Van Hees; Christophe Dirickx; Dimitri Karakatsanis
- Produced by: Bert Hamelinck; Kato Maes; Frank Van Passel
- Starring: Eline Kuppens; Matthias Schoenaerts; Tom De Wispelaere
- Cinematography: Nicolas Karakatsanis
- Edited by: Nico Leunen
- Production companies: Caviar Films; Vlaams Audiovisueel Fonds
- Distributed by: Vlaamse Televisie Maatschappij (VTM)
- Release date: 26 March 2008
- Running time: 102 minutes
- Country: Belgium
- Language: Dutch

Left Bank (Dutch: Linkeroever) is a 2008 Belgian horror film directed by Pieter Van Hees, starring Eline Kuppens and Matthias Schoenaerts. Its musical score was composed by Simon Lenski.

== Plot ==
Marie, an aspiring track star on her way to the European Championships, suffers a devastating setback when she is diagnosed with an immune infection and forced to rest. To pass the time, Marie moves in with Bobby, her charismatic new boyfriend who lives in a deluxe apartment in Antwerp's stylish Left Bank.

After learning the apartment's previous tenant mysteriously disappeared, Marie becomes obsessed with the mystery, all the while suffering from headaches, nausea, tension and insomnia. As Bobby dismisses her theories and fears, Marie delves deeper into her investigation, growing suspicious of her loving boyfriend and the ritzy building, whose long-hidden secrets have frightening consequences.

As the police close in and begin to investigate several mysterious deaths, it is revealed that Bobby is part of an ancient religious cult that celebrates rebirth and enacts a mysterious ritual every seven years on Samhain. As the day of the ritual approaches, Marie tries to leave, but Bobby catches her and drags her back. The cult enacts the ritual, forcing Marie into a black watery pit. As she passes through, she experiences a vision and then takes rebirth as a baby as she is reborn in the arms of her new parents.

== Cast ==
- Eline Kuppens as Marie
- Matthias Schoenaerts as Bobby
- Tom De Wispelaere as Dirk
- Sien Eggers as Bieke
- Marilou Mermans as Jeanne
- Frank Vercruyssen as Gilbert
- Robbie Cleiren as Dokter Verbeke
- Ruth Becquart as Hella
- Tom Dewispelaere as Dirk

== Reception ==
As of July 2020, the film holds an 83% approval rating on Rotten Tomatoes, based on six reviews with an average rating of 7.17/10. Many of the reviewers did not understand the ending, with Leslie Felperin from Variety writing, "Pieter van Hees' feature debut demonstrates promise, especially in its spooky, suggestive first half, and nicely showcases the talents and chiseled physiques of leads Eline Kuppens and Matthias Schoenaerts; shame that script's last stretch is derivative and borderline silly." Film Threat gave the film a positive review, commending the film'ch characters, finale, and for its blend of "passion, creeps, and head-scratches". Neil Young of The Hollywood Reporter also wrote, "Overloaded with disturbing hallucinations and disorienting, wannabe-Lynchian dream-sequences, "Left Bank" gradually spirals from intriguing chilliness to mood-killing, murkily-plotted silliness. The last scene is a real head-scratcher." HorrorNews.net called the film " A remarkable dark tale of the supernatural, which incorporates black magic along with the bizarre"' praising the film's atmosphere, authentic feel, provocative story, finale, and acting.
