= Ruth Ruth =

American pop punk band

- Genre: Pop punk
- Years active: 1993-1999, 2004, 2016
- Labels: American Recordings, RCA
- Members: Chris Kennedy; Johnny Powers
- Past members: Mike Lustig; Dave Snyder; Christian Nakata; Michael Kotch

Ruth Ruth is a pop punk band formed in New York City in 1993, with the original lineup consisting of Chris Kennedy on bass/lead vocals and songwriter, Mike Lustig on guitar, and drummer Dave Snyder.

== Band history and the American Recordings era ==
Initially playing gigs for free at New York City's famed Continental nightclub, their occasional shows became a residency and by the following year, Kennedy, Lustig and Snyder had signed a record deal with American Recordings. Their debut 1995 album was titled Laughing Gallery, which was seen with critical acclaim from those who heard it. The album was co-produced by Ted Niceley, who has produced Fugazi, Girls Against Boys and Kennedy separately. The song "Uninvited" from the album gained them some success, including alternative radio play and a few months of MTV rotation. The band then toured nationally with Everclear and No Doubt while also headlining shows and making several television appearances in the United Kingdom.

Unhappy with the label's handling of their album, in 1996 the band began to break away by releasing a 45 single on Deep Elm Records titled "Brainiac" with the flipside "Love Potion No. 10," produced by Kennedy, as well as a critically acclaimed EP on Epitaph The Little Death, again produced by Kennedy and Brett Guerwitz. Before the EP was released, however, Snyder left the group, replaced by drummer Christian Nakata. A video created for the song "Jerome" remains unreleased. Headline tours and support tours with Spacehog, Everclear and Samiam followed.

== The RCA records era ==
In 1997, the band recorded new material while still under contract to American. RCA Records A&R rep Brian Malouf, after seeing the band play a show at the Continental, expressed interest in signing the group. RCA paid American for the unreleased masters and they resurfaced in 1998 on RCA with Are You My Friend? with the addition of Michael Kotch of the band Eve's Plum on rhythm guitar. The title of the album was a direct, if unflattering quote from their A&R contact at American, and a song from the album titled "Kaboom" (with lyrics such as "now you're dead and I'm happy") was said to have been written in celebration of their escape from their relationship with American Recordings. The song "Condition" was featured in the film Urban Legend. AYMF? was co-produced by Kennedy and Chris Shaw.

== The 2000s and a new name – 'Ultra-V' ==
In 2000 the band recorded new material for RCA which was released under the band name Ultra-V. The album, Bring on the Fuego, co-produced by Kennedy and Matt Wallace represented a departure stylistically from Ruth Ruth. Bassist Maggie Kim joined the group for a handful of shows. The song "Shut Your Mouth" was featured in the film Joyride. "Can I Crash Here Tonight?" was featured in the TV show Roswell. Shortly after the album's release, however, the group disbanded. In 2010, Kennedy collaborated with Kid Rock on a re-write of the Ultra-V song, "Playboy Mansion," entitled "Cucci Galore." "Cucci Galore" is on Kid Rock's album, Rebel Soul, released November 19, 2012.

== Return to Ruth Ruth ==
In 2004, Kennedy, Lustig and Nakata reunited and released the album Right About Now, produced by Kennedy and released on their own label Flaming Peach Records. The album was critically well received and the band performed a handful of shows in New York City as well as the 9:30 Club in Washington, D.C., with Everclear, but shortly thereafter, the group inexplicably disbanded once again.

In 2009 the Ruth Ruth album Live in Toronto was released on In Music We Trust Records, a live recording culled from a 1996 CBC broadcast and was also very well received.

Although there has been some mention in passing by Kennedy on the band's Facebook page about reformation, only they know if the band will get together.

In 2016 Ruth Ruth decided to reform and recruit longtime friend and drummer Johnny Powers and continue to play shows in the NYC area.

The soundtrack to director / actor Noah Segan's 2022 film Blood Relatives features Ruth Ruth’s song "Jerome".

== Discography ==
- Laughing Gallery (Ventrue Records/American Recordings, 1995)
- Brainiac / Love Potion No. 10 (1996, Deep Elm Records)
- Little Death (1996, Epitaph Records)
- Are You My Friend? (1998, RCA Records)
- Right About Now (2004, Flaming Peach Records)
- Live In Toronto (2009, In Music We Trust Records)
