= Robert O'Sullivan =

Robert O'Sullivan may refer to:

- Robert O'Sullivan, musician in Possum Dixon
- Robert O'Sullivan (sailor), see List of World Championships medalists in sailing (centreboard classes)
- Rob O'Sullivan, Western Australian Sports Star of the Year

== See also ==
- Gerald Robert O'Sullivan, Irish VC recipient
- Robert Sullivan (disambiguation)
