= Nineties vs. Eighties =

EP by Girls Against Boys
- Released: 1 July 1990
- Recorded: 1988–1990
- Studio: Inner Ear Studios, Arlington, VA
- Genre: Post-hardcore
- Length: 22:38
- Label: Adult Swim
- Producer: Girls Against Boys

Girls Against Boys chronology
| Nineties vs. Eighties (1990) | Tropic of Scorpio (1992) |

Professional ratings
Review scores
| Source | Rating |
|---|---|
| AllMusic | 2.5/5 stars |

Nineties vs. Eighties is the debut EP and first major release by American post-hardcore band Girls Against Boys, released in 1990 by Adult Swim Records. Both sides of the EP features a different lineup of the band, and as a result, a different sound. The first side ("Nineties") represents the direction that the band would take in the ensuing years.

== Track listing ==
All tracks are written by Girls Against Boys.

| No. | Title | Length |
|---|---|---|
| 1. | "Stay in the Car" | 3:26 |
| 2. | "Jamie" | 3:52 |
| 3. | "Kitty-Yo" | 4:20 |
| 4. | "Move" | 3:40 |
| 5. | "Angels" | 3:13 |
| 6. | "Skind" | 4:04 |

== Personnel ==
Adapted from the Nineties vs. Eighties liner notes.

Girls Against Boys

- Brendan Canty – drums (4–6), organ (4–6)
- Alexis Fleisig – drums (1–3)
- Eli Janney – sampler, bass guitar (1–3), engineering
- Scott McCloud – lead vocals, guitar
- Johnny Temple – bass guitar (1–3)

Production and additional personnel

- Girls Against Boys – production
- Amy Pickering – vocals (5)

== Release history ==
| Region | Date | Label | Format | Catalog |
|---|---|---|---|---|
| United States | 1990 | Adult Swim | CD, LP | AS3 |
