= Girls Against Boys =

American post-hardcore band

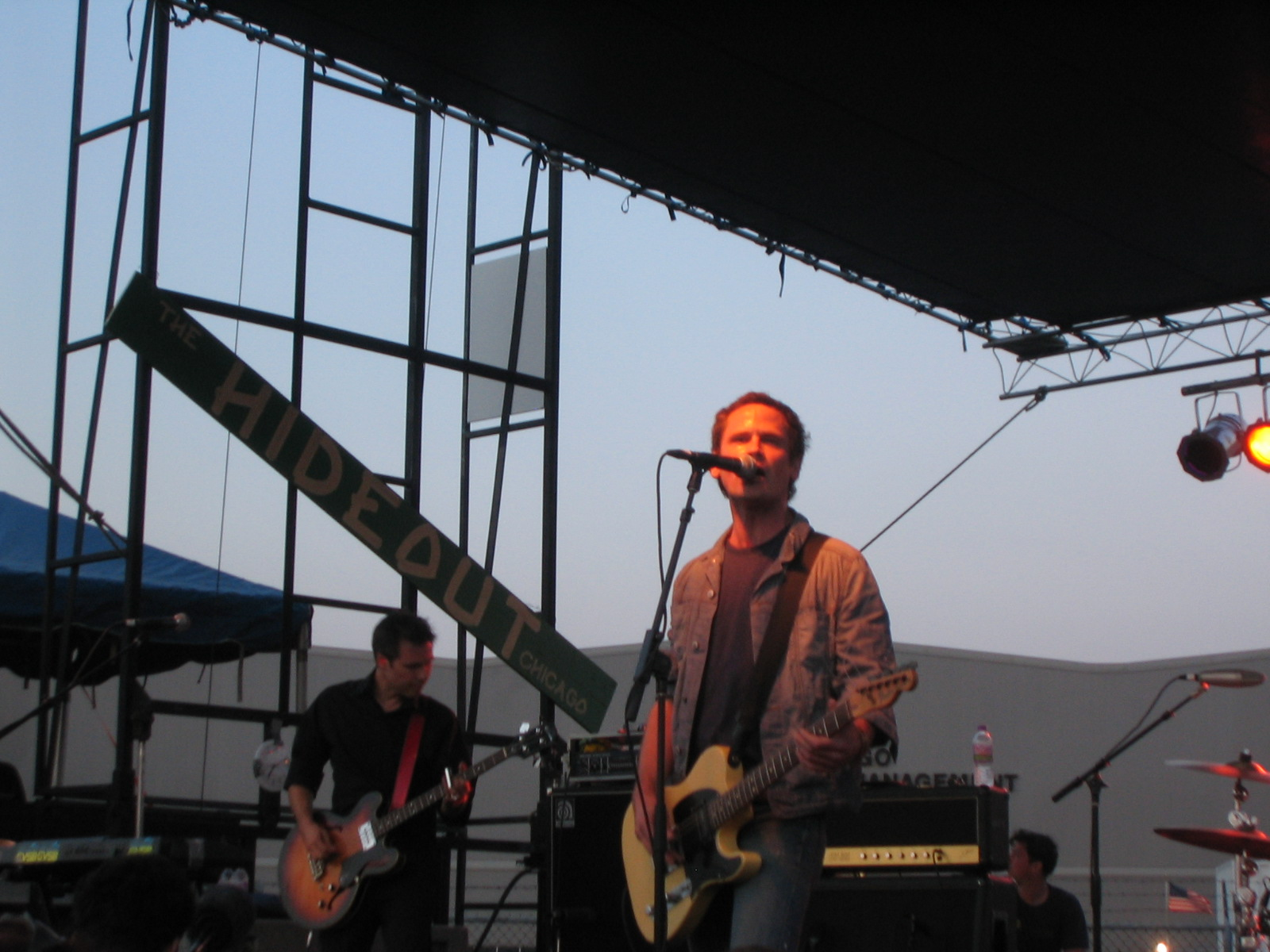
- Girls Against Boys at the Touch and Go 25th Anniversary Block Party, 2006

Background information
- Origin: Washington, D.C., United States
- Genres: Indie rock; alternative rock; post-hardcore
- Years active: 1989–2009, 2013–2017, 2021–present
- Labels: Touch and Go; Southern; Geffen; Jade Tree; Koch; Your Choice; Adult Swim; Epitonic
- Members: Eli Janney; Scott McCloud; Johnny Temple; Alexis Fleisig
- Past members: Brendan Canty; Luke Wood

Girls Against Boys is a post-hardcore band which formed in Washington, D.C., and subsequently relocated to New York City shortly after their formation in 1989. The band released albums on the labels Adult Swim, Touch and Go Records, Geffen Records, and Jade Tree from 1990 to 2002. The band then sporadically played shows from 2003 until 2009 when they became inactive. In 2013, Girls Against Boys briefly toured and self-released their first new material in 11 years. After another hiatus in 2017, they reunited for a longer term in 2021.

For the majority of their existence and on every release, the lineup has consisted of vocalist/guitarist Scott McCloud, keyboardist/bassist Eli Janney, bassist Johnny Temple, and drummer Alexis Fleisig.

== History ==
=== Formation, Nineties vs. Eighties, lineup changes, and Tropic of Scorpio (1989–1992) ===
The band was initially a studio side-project for bassist/keyboardist Eli Janney and drummer/keyboardist Brendan Canty. The duo wanted to experiment with other genres that were different from what they were involved in, primarily Canty's main band Fugazi. They initially called themselves Skind. The duo then enlisted Soulside guitarist Scott McCloud, who also provided vocals. By 1989, the group named themselves Girls Against Boys as a reflection on typical gender rivalries. The trio finished three songs in late 1989, described as industrial disco. By 1990, Soulside's vocalist Bobby Sullivan wanted to disband Soulside; thus, McCloud and his other Soulside bandmates (bassist Johnny Temple and drummer Alexis Fleisig) decided to create a new band named Little Baby, alongside former Rites of Spring bassist Mike Fellows. Little Baby was short-lived as they only played a handful of shows. McCloud then invited Temple and Fleisig to become involved with Girls Against Boys, and the trio worked with Janney on three additional studio songs in early 1990, described as more post-hardcore in nature. Both sessions were released later in 1990 as their debut effort Nineties vs. Eighties. It initially was released on Janney's novelty label Slate Records, but it later appeared on the independent label Adult Swim. The 1990 recordings were placed on the first side ("Nineties") while the 1989 recordings were placed on the second side ("Eighties"). By the time of its release, Canty departed from the band to focus on Fugazi. McCloud, Temple, and Fleisig then convinced Janney to move from Florida to New York, and they opted to continue the band as a full-time project. Shortly afterward, guitarist Luke Wood joined the band.

Although Janney handled keyboards and programming, he also played bass; thus, Girls Against Boys had an unusual lineup of dual bass guitars. For the lyrics, McCloud took an abstract approach, and metaphors became a common element as well. During the early stages of the initial full-length album's recording, Wood departed from the band to focus on his business career with major labels and his own band Sammy. Girls Against Boys decided to continue on as a quartet, and they then embarked on their first major tour of the U.S. in early 1992 as they opened for Fugazi. The band released the full-length album Tropic of Scorpio in December 1992. Janney self-produced the album due to his prior experience in the studio. Nathan Larson from the band Shudder to Think made guest appearances on various tracks, and Wood's guitar contributions remained as well. It was the band's second release on the Adult Swim label; however, they then decided to sign with the Touch and Go label the following year.

=== Venus Luxure No. 1 Baby, Cruise Yourself, and increased exposure (1993–1995) ===
Girls Against Boys released Venus Luxure No. 1 Baby, their second full-length album, on Touch and Go in 1993. It was produced by Ted Niceley, which marked the beginning of a long-standing relationship with the band (Janney was previously Niceley's studio assistant in the 1980s). The album received positive reviews and was included in the book 1001 Albums You Must Hear Before You Die. The band supported the album by touring on the side stage of the 1993 Lollapalooza tour, followed by brief runs with The Jesus Lizard, Helmet, and Jawbox.

The non-album single "Sexy Sam" was released in the middle of 1994 as a stopgap release, and the CD version included tracks from their first three major releases. They then again appeared on the side stage of Lollapalooza for the 1994 incarnation and also toured with The Jesus Lizard, and immediately after the tour's conclusion they released the album Cruise Yourself in October 1994, again produced by Niceley. It received a favorable response and was eventually included on accolade lists by Alternative Press and Rock de Lux. Both "(I) Don't Got a Place" and "Kill the Sexplayer" were released as singles, with the latter song also appearing in the influential comedy film Clerks and its accompanying soundtrack. The film was directed by Kevin Smith. "Cruise Your New Baby Fly Self", also from Cruise Yourself, appeared in Smith's subsequent 1995 film Mallrats and its soundtrack. The band made their televised debut in January 1995 on The Jon Stewart Show, playing the two aforementioned singles. They appeared on the show a second time in May of that year as they performed the Cruise Yourself tracks "Raindrop" and "Cruise Your New Baby Fly Self". "(I) Don't Got a Place" was also Girls Against Boys' first charting single, as it reached No. 91 on the UK Singles Chart. The Cruise Yourself album was also the band's first charting album as it peaked at No. 9 on the UK Rock & Metal Albums Chart. Also in 1995, the band recorded a cover of the Joy Division song "She's Lost Control", and it was included on the compilation A Means to an End: The Music of Joy Division. The song was selected to be released as its own single and a music video was produced for it as well. It peaked at No. 98 on the UK Singles Chart.

=== House of GVSB, major label signing, Freak*on*ica, and label shifts (1996–2000) ===
The band focused on creating their subsequent album in the latter half of 1995, again with Niceley as producer. House of GVSB was released in March 1996 and was critically praised by numerous outlets such as Spin (which ranked the album at No. 5 on its Best Albums of 1996 list), Kerrang, Sounds, and others. House of GVSB also appeared on the UK Albums Chart at No. 76. "Super-Fire" was released as the lead single, and it peaked at No. 82 on the UK Singles Chart, the band's highest position on the chart (it also peaked at No. 36 on the UK Dance Singles Chart). They performed the track on the television shows 120 Minutes (along with the other House of GVSB single "Disco Six Six Six") and Nulle Part Ailleurs in 1996. They also toured with Therapy? and Rage Against the Machine during the first half of 1996. For the second half of 1996, they joined the Lollapalooza tour for the third and final time. They also appeared at two prominent festivals in 1996, HFStival in Washington, D.C., and Reading in England. The 1996 film Suburbia contained Girls Against Boys' track "Bullet Proof Cupid" (originally from Venus Luxure No. 1 Baby) on its soundtrack. During the band's 1996 tours, they embraced various electronica and industrial acts. Janney took a side job as a DJ in New York City during 1997 to experiment with various sounds. He also remixed for numerous artists such as Sneaker Pimps and Ruby. Overall, the events became an early indication of the band's follow-up album. The group played a small number of shows throughout 1997, including the inaugural Fuji Rock Festival in Japan during the 1997 Pacific typhoon season. Also in 1997, the band's song "Super-Fire" from the House of GVSB album appeared in the film Love God. Spin also listed Girls Against Boys at No. 38 on its annual Most Vital Artists list.

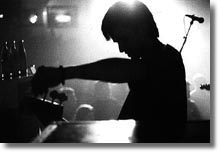
Johnny Temple (1993)

Numerous major labels approached Girls Against Boys, but the band initially resisted the labels' overtures, wanting to fulfill their three-album deal with Touch and Go. According to McCloud, their decision to stick with Touch and Go "only made the majors go more crazy for us," and soon "all the labels were following us around, buying us rooms in 5 star hotels, which was crazy, because we were still playing punk rock squats in Italy, for instance." Former Girls Against Boys guitarist Wood, who by then was working as an executive at Geffen Records, reached out to the band on behalf of his employer. The band signed a three-album deal with Geffen, and started recording their major label debut with producer Nick Launay in October 1997.

The recording process was deemed to be exhaustive because production lasted nearly six months. Previously, the band spent only one or two months on production. The electronic-influenced album Freak*on*ica was released in June 1998. The album peaked at No. 11 on the Billboard Heatseekers Chart and at No. 182 on the UK Albums Chart. It was praised by various publications such as Entertainment Weekly, Spin, and Pitchfork; however, it was criticized by other publications such as Rolling Stone and The A.V. Club. "Park Avenue" was released as the lead single, and it peaked at No. 83 on the UK Singles Chart and at No. 28 on the Billboard Hot Mainstream Rock Tracks chart. "Psycho-Future" from Freak*on*ica was released as a single as it appeared on the soundtrack to the 1998 remake film Psycho. The band went on a headlining tour throughout 1998, followed by a tour with labelmates Garbage. They also played at the Reading festival in England and Pukkelpop in Belgium. Girls Against Boys appeared on Late Night With Conan O'Brien, performing "Park Avenue". The band contributed the song "EPR" to the soundtrack of the film Permanent Midnight, and they appeared in the film 200 Cigarettes in one scene. Their cover of "Boogie Wonderland" was included on the 200 Cigarettes soundtrack.

Although Freak*on*ica performed moderately well (it was the band's best-selling effort up to that point), it did not meet Geffen Records' sales expectations. After the album's release, Geffen was bought by Canadian multinational Seagram. According to McCloud, Girls Against Boys were informed during their tour with Garbage "that Geffen Records would cease to exist as of January 1, 1999," leaving the band's future uncertain.

After a short 1999 tour with Firewater, Girls Against Boys remained in limbo as Universal Records (the parent of Geffen Records) continued to restructure its business, and the band was unable to extensively record or tour for nearly two years. Also in 1999, two tracks from Freak*on*ica ("Park Avenue" and "Psycho-Future") appeared in the racing video game Test Drive Off-Road 3. Girls Against Boys began demoing songs for a new album, initially slated to be released in early 2000. At one point that year, the band was moved to the Interscope Records brand; however, various conflicts led to the band parting ways with the label.

=== You Can't Fight What You Can't See and sporadic activity (2001–2009) ===
In 2001, the band recorded the score to the film Series 7: The Contenders. The accompanying soundtrack mainly consisted of their contributions. Toward the end of 2001, Girls Against Boys signed with the independent label Jade Tree. They teamed up with producer Niceley, who worked on three of Girls Against Boys' previous albums. The album, titled You Can't Fight What You Can't See, was released in May 2002. "Basstation" was released as the sole single, and the band supported the album by headlining their own tour with Yeah Yeah Yeahs as support. After touring Australia that same year, Janney sat out a tour of Europe due to a family emergency; thus, Sohrab Habibion (former frontman of the band Edsel) took his place throughout the remainder of the year. The following year, "All the Rage" from You Can't Fight What You Can't See was included in the snowboarding video game Amped 2.

In late 2003, Girls Against Boys (without Janney) accompanied actress Gina Gershon as her backing band for a brief tour of the United States. The purpose of the tour was to promote Gershon's film Prey for Rock & Roll, in which she portrayed an aging punk rock vocalist. The tour was featured on the documentary series Rocked With Gina Gershon the following year. After two small Spain shows in 2004, the band members wanted to focus on other ventures, but they were reactivated for various one-off shows and brief tours. A small European tour in February 2005 excluded Janney, but John Schmersal (from the bands Enon and Brainiac) filled in on the tour. Some other examples included the band playing Venus Luxure No. 1 Baby in its entirety at the 2006 All Tomorrow's Parties in London, the Touch and Go 25th Anniversary Party in 2006, a brief European tour in February 2007, the Primavera Festival in 2007, a brief European tour in February 2008, and their first visit to Russia in February 2009.

=== Brief reformation and The Ghost List (2013–2017) ===
From early 2009 to early 2013, the band became inactive as they had not played any shows, released any material, or posted any updates. In the summer of 2013, the band reunited, and they embarked on a longer-than-usual European tour (with Schmersal filling in for an absent Janney) plus a handful of dates in the United States. The prolonged reunion prompted the band to enter the studio, and in September 2013 they released their first new material in 11 years, The Ghost List. It was self-released by the band along with the internet label Epitonic.

After a few sporadic shows near the end of 2013, the band again entered an extended hiatus from early 2014 to late 2016, in which they then briefly reunited to perform at Riot Fest and Sound on Sound Fest. After two shows in 2017, one of which celebrated McCloud's 50th birthday and the other of which was the release party of a Brainiac documentary, the band became inactive again.

=== Reissues and extended reunion (2021–present) ===
In August 2021, Girls Against Boys announced that they were reissuing their House of GVSB album (which included an entire extra tracklist of b-sides and outtakes), along with a small set of tour dates in the United States to promote the reissue. The House of GVSB reissue was then released in May 2022 by Touch and Go. Throughout 2022, the band toured in both the U.S. and Europe to support the reissue. In early 2025, Girls Against Boys announced a short April tour of Japan alongside Soulside. It marked Girls Against Boys' first visit to Japan since 1997 and Soulside's first visit overall. In February 2026, Girls Against Boys returned to Australia to play shows in celebration of Cruise Yourself (which was remastered and reissued both digitally and on vinyl), with Schmersal again filling in for Janney on bass and keyboards.

== Musical style and influences ==
Frontman Scott McCloud has stated that the band's "primary cues" come from "avant-garde English punk bands, like Joy Division." McCloud has cited Big Black, Einstürzende Neubauten, Skinny Puppy, Sonic Youth, and Killing Joke as personal influences, with the Fall and the Velvet Underground additionally inspiring his unique singing style.

According to McCloud, most of his lyrics "come from late night situations: people talking in bars, just normal conversations. I catch their words and phrases, and I try to put them into a theme that interests me. I also work a lot with repetition, so things start to sound like a slogan but in fact they might be personal." McCloud also avoids writing lyrics that directly address his political beliefs and has described his approach to writing lyrics as "I'll just have a love song and throw in some designer clothing line and it all wraps up together."

== Related projects ==
McCloud and Temple played together in a side-project called New Wet Kojak, releasing two records on Chicago's Touch and Go followed with three more on Beggars Banquet. The group included Geoff Turner (Gray Matter), Nick Pellicciotto (Edsel), and Charles Bennington (High Back Chairs).

McCloud and Fleisig formed the band Paramount Styles in 2007, who have released three albums, two on the Dutch label Cycle/Konkurrent Records (2008's Failure American Style and 2010's Heaven's Alright) and one on Silver Rocket (2017's Distant Karma). The group has toured extensively in Europe and less extensively in the United States and Canada. The group featured revolving guests including Richard Fortus (Guns N' Roses/The Psychedelic Furs), Geoff Sanoff (Edsel), Julia Kent, Simon Lenski (DAAU), Chris Smets, Libor Palucha, and also Girls Against Boys fill-in member Schmersal.

Fleisig performed with Moby for his 1996 album Animal Rights. Fleisig also later joined the Italian band Bellini in 2002, and the band's output was primarily produced by Steve Albini. Fleisig later joined the supergroup Obits, alongside Drive Like Jehu frontman Rick Froberg, Greg Simpson, and Edsel frontman Habibion. Fleisig was also briefly a member of Edsel from 2012 to 2013.

McCloud was a featured guest on the 1996 album In a Bar, Under the Sea by the band Deus. He also contributed guitar for several tracks on Courtney Love's 2004 solo debut album America's Sweetheart. McCloud digitally released a solo live album in 2010 titled Dobeška 170910, recorded at a concert in Prague.

After Girls Against Boys decreased their activity in 2003, Janney became a full-time producer for many musical acts, including Obits and James Blunt. In addition, he became the keyboardist and musical director for the talk show Late Night with Seth Meyers in 2014. The house band dubbed themselves the 8G Band.

In 1997, Temple founded Akashic Books, an independent publisher, known for many books including Go the Fuck to Sleep and Hairstyles of the Damned. Temple has written for The Nation and other publications. In 2020, Temple formed the band Fake Names alongside guitarist Brian Baker (Minor Threat/Bad Religion), guitarist Michael Hampton (The Faith/S.O.A.), and vocalist Dennis Lyxzén (Refused). They released their self-titled debut album later that same year on Epitaph Records. The band then released a self-titled EP in 2021, which featured original Girls Against Boys member Canty on drums.

== Members ==
=== Current members ===
- Scott McCloud – lead vocals, guitars (1989–2009, 2013–2017, 2021–present)
- Eli Janney – keyboards, bass, programming, backup vocals (1989–2009, 2013–2017, 2021–present)
- Johnny Temple – bass (1990–2009, 2013–2017, 2021–present)
- Alexis Fleisig – drums (1990–2009, 2013–2017, 2021–present)

=== Former members ===
- Brendan Canty – drums, keyboards (1989–1990)
- Luke Wood – guitars (1990–1991)

=== Touring members ===
- Sohrab Habibion – keyboards, bass, backup vocals (2002)
- John Schmersal – keyboards, bass, backup vocals (2005, 2013, 2026)

=== Timeline ===
Colors denotes main role(s) in the band.

== Discography ==
- Nineties vs. Eighties (1990)
- Tropic of Scorpio (1992)
- Venus Luxure No. 1 Baby (1993)
- Cruise Yourself (1994)
- House of GVSB (1996)
- Freak*on*ica (1998)
- You Can't Fight What You Can't See (2002)
- The Ghost List (2013)

"Super-Fire"
Sample of "Super-Fire" by Girls Against Boys, from House of GVSB (1996)

"She's Lost Control (Joy Division cover)"
Sample of Girls Against Boys' cover of Joy Division's 1979 song "She's Lost Control", released on the Joy Division tribute album A Means to an End: The Music of Joy Division (1995)
