= A Means to an End: The Music of Joy Division =

Compilation album by Various artists
- Released: September 12, 1995
- Genres: Post-punk, indie rock
- Length: 60:32
- Label: Virgin

Professional ratings
Review scores
Source	Rating
AllMusic	4/5 stars

A Means to an End: The Music of Joy Division is a tribute album, featuring various artists covering the songs of Joy Division. It was released in 1995 by Virgin Records.

== Track listing ==
No.	Title	Performer	Length
1.	"She's Lost Control"	Girls Against Boys	3:28
2.	"Day of the Lords"	Honeymoon Stitch	4:55
3.	"New Dawn Fades"	Moby	5:34
4.	"Transmission"	Low	6:12
5.	"Atmosphere"	Codeine	4:50
6.	"Insight"	Further	3:54
7.	"Love Will Tear Us Apart"	Stanton Miranda	3:58
8.	"Isolation"	Starchildren	3:49
9.	"Heart and Soul"	Kendra Smith	6:08
10.	"Twenty Four Hours"	Versus	4:25
11.	"Warsaw"	Desert Storm	4:03
12.	"They Walked in Line"	godheadSilo	2:24
13.	"Interzone"	Face to Face	2:30
14.	"As You Said"	Tortoise	4:22
Total length:			60:32
