= Robert "Sully" Sullivan =

American broadcaster, entrepreneur and musician

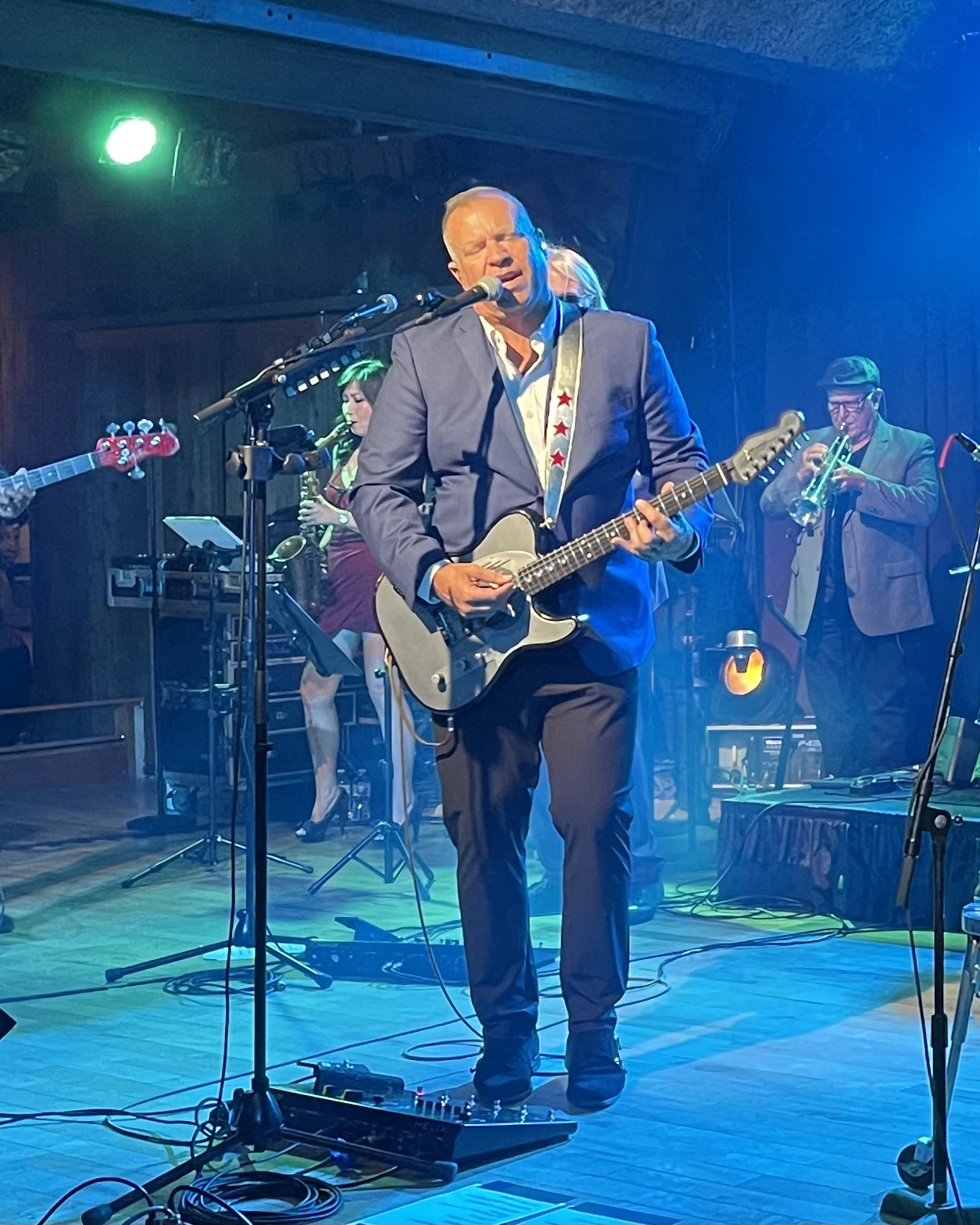
- Sullivan performing with The Sully Band at The Belly Up in San Diego
- Born: July 6, 1961 (age 65); San Diego, California, United States
- Occupations: Radio personality, television personality, musician, entrepreneur, keynote speaker
- Known for: The Big Biz Show, On The Air San Diego, The Sully Band
- Children: 2
- Website: sullyentertainmentgroup.com

Robert "Sully" Sullivan is an American radio and television personality, entrepreneur, and lead singer and guitarist for The Sully Band. He is the host of the nationally syndicated business and personal finance television program, The Big Biz Show, which is simulcast across over 150 domestic radio stations, millions of broadcast television homes, and internationally via the American Forces Network. Sullivan is also a professional business keynote speaker, specializing in negotiation skills.

== Early life and education ==
Sullivan was raised in San Diego, and began playing guitar at the age of six after learning "(Sittin' On) The Dock of the Bay" with his father. As a teenager, he attended Clairemont and Valhalla high schools, where he played football before attending SDSU. While at college, Sullivan participated in theater before receiving his B.A. in journalism in 1983.

== Career ==
Sullivan began his career in the late 1980s, working as a newspaper publisher in San Diego, before becoming an investment banker and business consultant. After making several guest radio and television appearances as a business expert, he was approached by KCEO and KSDO, where he hosted a morning show and appeared regularly during drive time hours. Sully later joined KOGO, and began appearing regularly on the San Diego's Morning News program as a business reporter, before hosting several of his own shows, with topics ranging from financial advice and political commentary, to local news and business.

Besides making frequent television news appearances as a business and financial expert, Sullivan also joined KUSI as a regular contributor on the Good Morning San Diego program. Since 2020, Sullivan has co-hosted On The Air, an hour-long interview and San Diego lifestyle show with comedian Russ Stolnack (Russ T Nailz) and radio producer "Little" Tommy Sablan. Sullivan and Stolnack have also co-hosted The Big Biz Show together for over 25 years, a nationally syndicated show simulcast daily in over 50 million television homes internationally.

== Music ==
In 2018, Sullivan formed the band Sully & The Souljahs, participated in San Diego's KAABOO Del Mar festival, and released several singles independently. After Sully & The Souljahs, Sullivan formed The Sully Band and began playing shows and releasing music via Belly Up Records and Blue Élan Records in 2021.

On March 11, 2022, The Sully Band released their debut album 'Let's Straighten It Out!', which featured a collection of 60s and 70s soul, blues, funk, and R&B tracks made popular by artists such as Billy Preston, Jackie Wilson, Ray Charles, and Dr. John & Jessie Hill. The tribute album debuted at No. 3 on the Billboard Blues chart and peaked at No. 2. The album is produced by Grammy Award-winning producer Chris Goldsmith. Previously, The Sully Band was voted Best Live Band at the 31st Annual San Diego Music Awards in 2020.

In 2024, Sullivan started a new group named sullvn.

== Personal life ==
Sullivan is a frequent contributor to the Challenged Athletes Foundation, having regularly participated in the Million Dollar Challenge since featuring the charity program on The Big Biz Show in 2010. Besides cycling and fundraising, Sullivan also performs benefit concerts as part of The Sully Band on behalf of the organization.

Sullivan currently lives in San Diego, and has two daughters.
