= Cruise Yourself =

Studio album by Girls Against Boys
- Released: October 3, 1994
- Recorded: May 1994
- Studio: Oz Studios, Baltimore, United States
- Genre: Post-hardcore; indie rock
- Length: 40:59
- Label: Touch and Go
- Producer: Ted Niceley

Girls Against Boys chronology
| (I) Don't Got a Place (1994) | Cruise Yourself (1994) | Kill the Sexplayer (1995) |

Cruise Yourself is the third studio album by the American post-hardcore band Girls Against Boys, released in October 1994 by the record label Touch and Go.

== Reception ==
Professional ratings
Review scores
| Source | Rating |
|---|---|
| AllMusic | 4/5 stars |
| Christgau's Consumer Guide | (dud) |
| The Encyclopedia of Popular Music | 3/5 stars |
| Kerrang! | 5/5 stars |
| MusicHound Rock | 3.5/5 stars |
| NME | 3.5/5 stars |
| Q | 3/5 stars |
| The Rolling Stone Album Guide | 3/5 stars |
| Select | 4/5 stars |
| Trouser Press | unfavorable |

Cruise Yourself has received a mixed-to-favorable response from critics.

=== Accolades ===
| Year | Publication | Country | Accolade | Rank |
|---|---|---|---|---|
| 1998 | Alternative Press | United States | "The 90 Greatest Albums of the '90s" | 53 |
| 2000 | Rock de Lux | Spain | "Best Albums of the '90s" | 102 |
"*" denotes an unordered list.

== Track listing ==
All tracks are written by Girls Against Boys.

| No. | Title | Length |
|---|---|---|
| 1. | "Tucked-In" | 4:17 |
| 2. | "Cruise Your New Baby Fly Self" | 3:11 |
| 3. | "Kill the Sexplayer" | 3:16 |
| 4. | "(I) Don't Got a Place" | 3:43 |
| 5. | "Psychic Know-How" | 3:41 |
| 6. | "Explicitly Yours" | 4:59 |
| 7. | "From Now On" | 4:15 |
| 8. | "Raindrop" | 3:13 |
| 9. | "The Royal Lowdown" | 2:41 |
| 10. | "My Martini" | 3:41 |
| 11. | "Glazed-Eye" | 4:02 |

== Personnel ==
Adapted from the Cruise Yourself liner notes.

Girls Against Boys

- Alexis Fleisig – drums
- Eli Janney – organ, vibraphone, bass guitar, engineering
- Scott McCloud – lead vocals, guitar
- Johnny Temple – bass guitar, sampler

Production and additional personnel

- Ted Niceley – production
- Mike Rippe – additional engineering

== Release history ==
| Region | Date | Label | Format | Catalog |
|---|---|---|---|---|
| United States | 1994 | Touch and Go | CD, CS, LP | TG134 |
