= Soulside =

American post-hardcore band

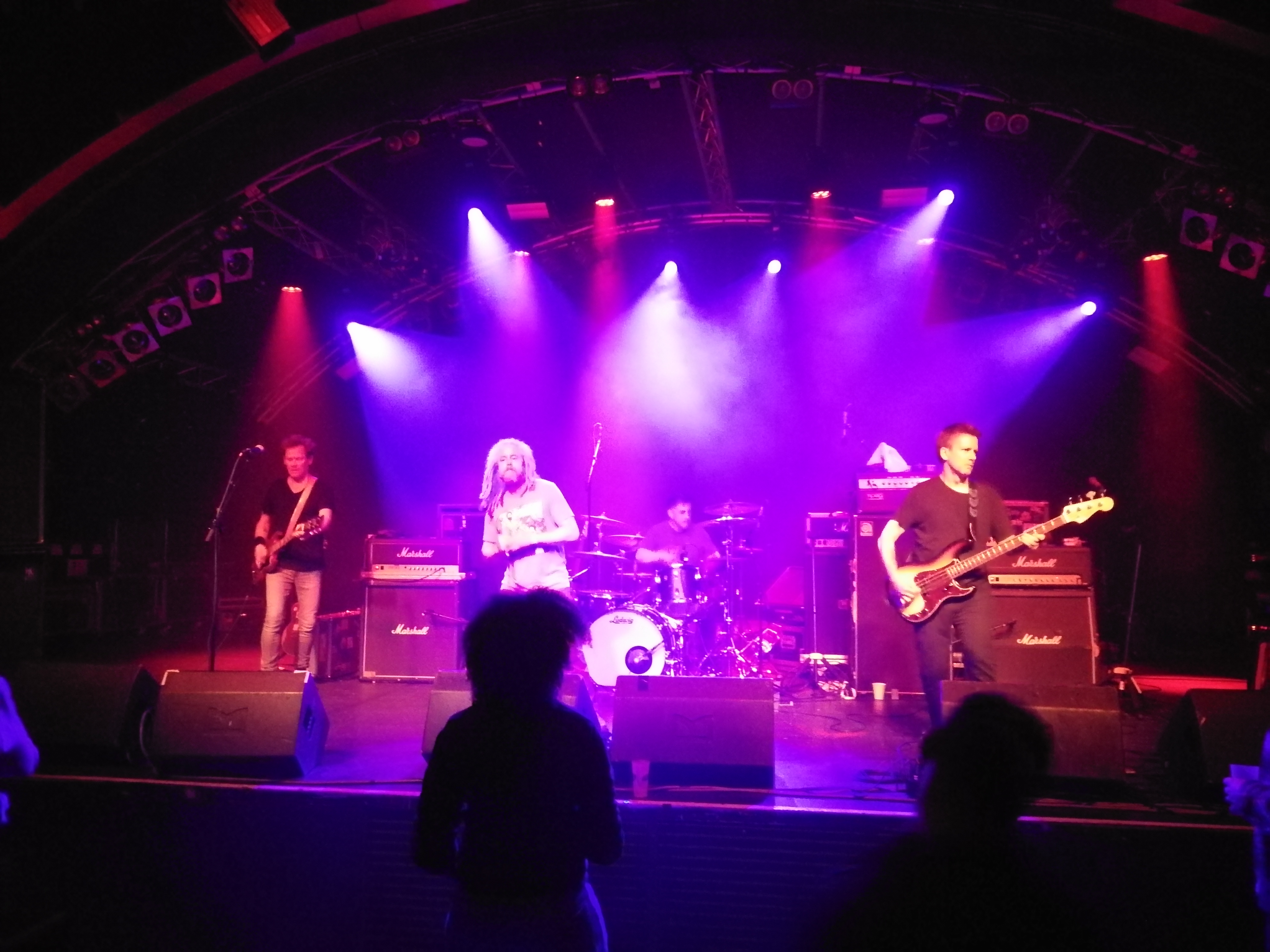
- Soulside performing in 2024

Background information
- Origin: Washington, D.C., United States
- Genres: Hardcore punk; post-hardcore; post-punk; emo
- Years active: 1985–1989, 2014–present
- Labels: Dischord Records; Sammich
- Members: Bobby Sullivan; Scott McCloud; Johnny Temple; Alexis Fleisig
- Past members: Chris Thomson
- Website: Band page at Dischord Records

Soulside, also spelled Soul Side, is an American post-hardcore band from the greater Washington, D.C. area.

== History ==
The original name of the band was Lunchmeat which was formed by high school students Bobby Sullivan, Chris Thomson, Scott McCloud and Alexis Fleisig in 1985. Lunchmeat played their last show under that name on August 29 of the same year as the group went on hiatus while the members went to college.

The next summer the band reunited under the name Soulside recording an album at the Inner Ear Studios with Ian MacKaye, Don Zientara, and Eli Janney. The album was the second release on Sammich Records. At the end of the summer, the band again went on hiatus as the members returned to college except for Thomson who had decided not return to college and formed Ignition with Chris Bald. When the other three band members returned from college in summer 1987, they had all agreed to quit college and dedicate themselves to the band. They recruited high school friend Johnny Temple to replace Thomson on bass. In 1987, the band returned to Inner Ear studios with Ian MacKaye to record their second album, Trigger, for Dischord Records. The band toured throughout the U.S.

They disbanded in summer of 1989, after an extensive three-month European tour which included the recording of Hot Bodi-Gram. The other members of the band were unhappy with Sullivan's topical and political lyrics while Sullivan was worried the group had become a "party band" during the long European tour. They played a few more shows after the European tour but broke up soon afterwards.

Soulside was the only American band to play at one of the illegal punk shows held in East Berlin in the 1980s, shows put on in tolerant Lutheran churches against the wishes of the dictatorship and its security organs such as the Stasi. According to McCloud, the band could not bring guitars across Checkpoint Charlie and were warned by people in attendance not to leave the venue until after they finished playing in case the Stasi were lying in wait.

Following Soulside's demise, Scott McCloud, Johnny Temple, and Alexis Fleisig would join Eli Janney to form the post-hardcore band Girls Against Boys at the end of the 1980s. Janney had frequently been a part of Soulside's tours, doing the sound at their shows. Bobby Sullivan went on to form a band called Seven League Boots, who played a blend of reggae and punk. Afterwards he was involved with Rain Like the Sound of Trains, Sevens, and Spontaneous Earth. Following his time with Ignition, Chris Thomson would serve as the lead vocalist for Circus Lupus.

In 2017, Soulside reunited to play one show in Prague at Scott McCloud's fiftieth birthday on November 5 at the Lucerna Music Bar. In 2019, the band played several shows in Europe and recorded three songs which were released in August 2020 on Dischord Records via Bandcamp. A 7-inch vinyl single with two of the songs was also released.

== Band members ==
- Bobby Sullivan – vocals (1985–1989, 2014–present)
- Alexis Fleisig – drums (1985–1989, 2014–present)
- Scott McCloud – guitar (1985–1989, 2014–present)
- Johnny Temple – bass (1987–1989, 2014–present)
- Chris Thomson – bass (1985–1987)

== Releases ==
- "Thanks" Split Single w/ Mission Impossible - Released under the "Lunchmeat" name (Sammich, 1985) Re-released with the title Getting Shit for Growing up Different
- Less Deep Inside Keeps LP/CD (Sammich/Dischord co-release, 1987)
- Trigger LP (Dischord, 1988)
- "Bass" b/w "103" 7 inch Single (Dischord, 1989)
- Hot Bodi-Gram LP (Dischord, 1989)
- Soon Come Happy CD (Dischord, 1990) (Note: a compilation of Trigger, "Bass" single, and Hot Bodi-Gram.)
- "This Ship" b/w "Madeleine Said" 7 inch Single/digital EP (Dischord, 2020) (Note: Digital EP comes with a third song, "Survival")
- A Brief Moment in the Sun LP (Dischord, 2022)
