= Edsel (band) =

American post-hardcore band

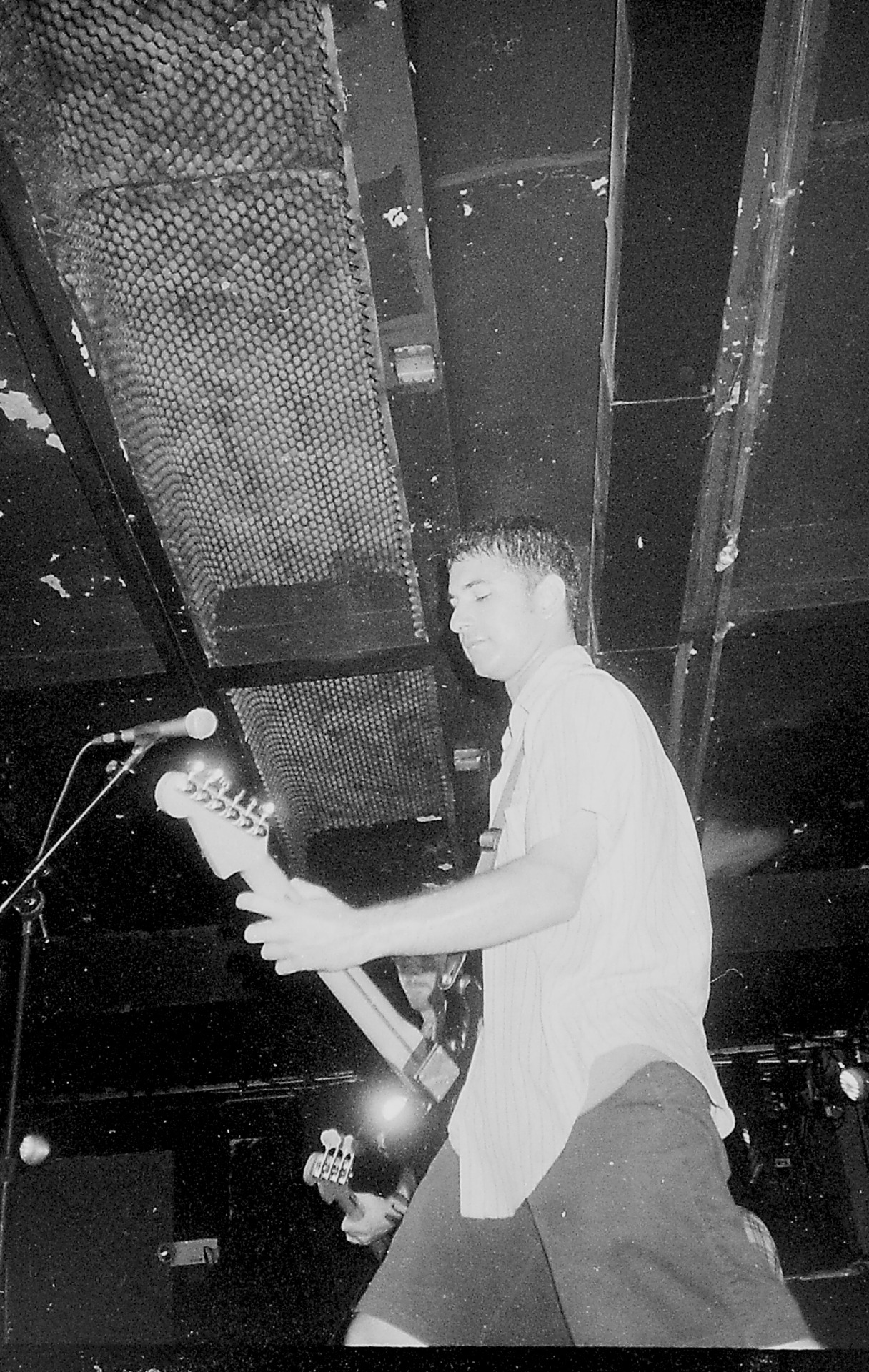
- Left to right: Sanoff and Habibion in 1995

Background information
- Origin: Washington, D.C., U.S.
- Genres: Indie rock, Post-hardcore
- Years active: 1988–1997, 2000–2001, 2012–2013
- Labels: DeSoto, Simple Machines, Merkin, Grass, Jade Tree, Relativity, Thick, Radiopaque Recordings, Comedy Minus One
- Past members: Sohrab Habibion; Steve Raskin; Geoff Sanoff; Alexis Fleisig; Steven Albert; John Pamer; John Dugan; Nick Pellicciotto; Eli Janney; Steve Ward
- Website: Official website

Edsel was an American post-hardcore band from Washington, D.C. who formed in 1988. They released four albums on a yearly basis from 1992 to 1995, which included the Techniques of Speed Hypnosis album on the major label Relativity Records in 1995. They went on a hiatus in 1997, followed by brief reformations from 2000 to 2001 and 2012 to 2013.

== History ==
=== Formation, Strange Loop, and various lineup changes (1988–1992) ===
Frontman Sohrab Habibion and his family had immigrated to the U.S. from Iran during the Iranian Revolution in the early 1980s. After his mother won an acoustic guitar at an auction, Habibion taught himself the instrument, and eventually found an interest in the punk rock genres. At a Government Issue show in the spring of 1987, Habibion met drummer Nick Pellicciotto. Pellicciotto had occasionally toured with the band Fugazi as a technician. They shared similar tastes in music, primarily punk rock. In 1988, Pellicciotto and Habibion witnessed bassist Steve Ward perform at a talent show, and they subsequently asked him to join their band Edsel.

The trio recorded a demo tape with producer Don Zientara throughout 1989, followed by the release of the "My Manacles" single later that same year. The single was the first release on the independent label DeSoto Records. Edsel had created the label alongside the band Jawbox, but Edsel distanced themselves from the business aspects shortly afterwards. Edsel's first outside contribution was on the Simple Machines EP Wedge, which included the non-album track "Feeder", produced by Barrett Jones. Edsel played various shows with Fugazi and also did a brief tour with Jawbox in the first half of 1990. From the summer of 1990 to early 1991, Edsel recorded their debut album with engineer Eli Janney. During the recording process, Janney became a member of the band as he contributed keyboards and samples. Edsel's debut album, titled Strange Loop, was released in 1992 on an independent label from Baltimore, Merkin Records. Around the same time, Janney departed from the band to focus on his band Girls Against Boys. Instead of hiring a keyboardist, Edsel added a second guitarist to the lineup, Steve Raskin. Bassist Ward also left the band and the music industry entirely, and he was replaced by Geoff Sanoff (a high school friend of Pellicciotto who also met Habibion at the same Government Issue concert in 1987).

=== The Everlasting Belt Co. and Detroit Folly (1993–1994) ===
Throughout the first half of 1993, Edsel recorded their second album with producer Zientara. A split-single with Jawbox was released as a stopgap, which featured the Jawbox song "Savory" and the Edsel song "Penaluna". The band also signed with Grass Records, an independent label that had a distribution deal with BMG Music. Edsel's second album, The Everlasting Belt Co., was eventually released in late 1993. Helium supported Edsel for The Everlasting Belt Co.'s release party concert. Edsel then toured behind the album with bands such as Scrawl and Shudder to Think, and also appeared at the 1993 incarnation of HFStival.

In early 1994, Pellicciotto left the band to venture into other projects. He was replaced on drums by John Dugan, who was a member of the band Chisel. Edsel co-headlined a tour with Pitchblende throughout 1994, in addition to another appearance at HFStival. Around the same time, Edsel entered the studio with Janney as producer and recorded a cover of the Tom Petty song "You Got Lucky" for the You Got Lucky: A Tribute to Tom Petty compilation. Petty himself later praised Edsel's cover of the song. The band then regrouped in the studio with Steve Palmieri. Detroit Folly, the band's third album, was released towards the end of 1994.

=== Major label signing, Techniques of Speed Hypnosis, and first hiatus (1995–1997) ===
In early 1995, Edsel released the single "Number 5 Recitative" on the label Jade Tree, although it was later re-recorded for the band's fourth album. Dugan returned to Chisel shortly after. Edsel recorded a cover of "Plastic Passion" by The Cure as a trio alongside a session drummer (John Pamer from Tsunami), and it appeared on the compilation Give Me the Cure. Afterwards, Steven Albert became the band's permanent drummer. Edsel then signed a contract with the major label Relativity Records. Due to the increased budget, the band flew overseas to the U.K. and worked in the studio with producer Anjali Dutt, who was known for her collaborations with bands such as Sloan, My Bloody Valentine, Oasis, The Jesus and Mary Chain, Swervedriver, among others. Edsel's fourth and final album was released in the fall of 1995, Techniques of Speed Hypnosis.

A few months after the release of Techniques of Speed Hypnosis, Relativity dropped the band from their roster, mainly due to Sony Music's takeover and eventual restructuring of Relativity. Despite no longer being on a label, Edsel entered the studio and recorded a handful of songs. Two songs from the sessions were initially released on Thick Records, the "Perched Like a Parasite" single. The band appeared at the 1996 incarnation of SXSW, and also played various shows with Girls Against Boys in 1996.

In early 1997, Dischord Records and Radiopaque Recordings released Edsel's 1996 studio sessions under the title of Extended Play. It featured the two songs that were previously released on the Thick Records single (albeit slightly remixed) in addition to two other tracks. Around the same time, Albert departed from the band and was replaced by Tsunami drummer Pamer, who had previously appeared in the studio briefly with Edsel in 1995. Although the band played a handful of one-off shows, the four members eventually focused on other projects, and thus the band entered a hiatus by the end of 1997.

=== Reunions and additional releases (1998–present) ===
Edsel reformed for a singular show in early 2000 at New York City. The lineup consisted of Habibion, Raskin, Sanoff, and Albert. Roughly a year later, they entered a studio named Stratosphere, which was where Sanoff had worked at. Stratosphere had just opened its doors by then, and to experiment with the studio's capabilities, Sanoff invited his bandmates in Edsel to record. The band created three songs, but they did not get released at that point.

Throughout 2012, Edsel's back catalog was added onto digital services. Their four full-length albums also got reissued digitally for the first time as well, handled by the independent label Comedy Minus One. The band announced their reunion in August 2012, with Girls Against Boys' member Alexis Fleisig on drums. The band played their first reunion show alongside Lotion in New York City.

In January 2013, Filter Magazine released the compilation Milo Turns 50. Edsel contributed a cover of The Descendents' song "Good Good Things", and it was the band's first new material released in roughly 15 years. The band also made an appearance at SXSW in March of that year.

After another period of inactivity, Edsel released the EP titled A Lost Language in August 2020. Background text by Sanoff accompanied the EP, which explained that the three tracks were pulled from the aforementioned 2001 sessions, and he had properly mixed and mastered them for release.

== Members ==
- Sohrab Habibion – vocals, guitars (1988–1997, 2000–2001, 2012–2013)
- Nick Pellicciotto – drums (1988–1994)
- Steve Ward – bass (1988–1992)
- Eli Janney – keyboards, vocals (1990–1992)
- Steve Raskin – guitars, vocals (1992–1997, 2000–2001, 2012–2013)
- Geoff Sanoff – bass (1992–1997, 2000–2001, 2012–2013)
- John Dugan – drums (1994–1995)
- Steven Albert – drums (1995–1997, 2000–2001)
- John Pamer – drums (1997)
- Alexis Fleisig – drums (2012–2013)

== Discography ==
=== Albums ===
- Strange Loop (1992; Merkin)
- The Everlasting Belt Co. (1993; Grass)
- Detroit Folly (1994; Grass)
- Techniques of Speed Hypnosis (1995; Relativity)

=== EPs ===
- Edsel (1990; Self-Released)
- Extended Play (1997; Radiopaque/Dischord)
- A Lost Language (2020; Peculiar Works)

=== Singles ===
- "My Manacles" (1989; DeSoto)
- "Coil-Re-Coil" (1992; Merkin)
- "Buckle" (1993; Grass)
- "Penaluna" (1993; DeSoto)
- "Switch the Codes" (1994; Grass)
- "No. 5 Recitative" (1995; Jade Tree)
- "Perched Like a Parasite" (1996; Thick)

=== Compilations ===
- "Feeder" on Wedge (1990; Simple Machines)
- "Feeder" on Simple Machines: 1990-1993 (1993; Simple Machines)
- "Derelict Fancy" on Echos From the Nation's Capital: A Washington, D.C. Compilation (1993; Third World Underground)
- "Fortune of Space" on Anon (1993; Castle von Buhler)
- "Flywheel" on WGNS: Gots No Station Compilation Volume 2 (1994; WGNS)
- "You Got Lucky" on You Got Lucky: A Tribute to Tom Petty (1994; Scotti Bros.)
- "Penaluna" and "Whistle Down" on Pulled From the Wreckage: A Grass Records Sampler (1994; Grass)
- "Plastic Passion" on Give Me the Cure: A Tribute to The Cure (1995; Radiopaque/Corduroy)
- "Suits Me Fine" on Vehicle (1995; Shute)
- "Glazed by the Cold Front" on CD 19 (1996; Huh)
- "Under a Hard Ride" on Indie-Rock Flea Market (1997; Flip)
- "No. 5 Recitative" and "Laugh Him to Scorn" on First Five Years (2000; Jade Tree)
- "Good Good Things" on Milo Turns 50: Songs of The Descendents (2013; Filter)
