= Tropic of Scorpio =

Studio album by Girls Against Boys
- Released: December 2, 1992
- Recorded: August 1991
- Studios: Inner Ear, Arlington, VA
- Genre: Indie rock
- Length: 31:09
- Label: Adult Swim
- Producer: Eli Janney

Girls Against Boys chronology
Nineties vs. Eighties (1990)	Tropic of Scorpio (1992)	Venus Luxure No. 1 Baby (1993)

Tropic of Scorpio is the debut studio album by American band Girls Against Boys, released in 1992 by record label Adult Swim.

== Reception ==
Professional ratings
Review scores
Source	Rating
AllMusic	3/5 stars

Trouser Press wrote that the album "rocks savagely on 'Wow Wow Wow', staggers drunkenly on 'Wasting Away' and pushes the distortion envelope on 'Plush'." The Washington Post noted that "'Matching Wits with Flaming Frank' and 'Wasting Away' possess some needed vehemence, but such jazzy tracks as 'Everywhere I Go I Seem to Spend $20' ... are just so much vapor."

AllMusic called it "a slightly off-and-on affair, but when it works it fulfills the promise of the earliest recordings and then a little bit more."

== Track listing ==
All tracks are written by Girls Against Boys.

No.	Title	Length
1.	"My Night of Pleasure (With the Mudjacking Contractors)"	4:21
2.	"Wow Wow Wow"	2:29
3.	"Matching Wits with Flaming Frank"	2:46
4.	"Can't Do Anything but Love You, Babe"	3:05
5.	"Wasting Away"	2:54
6.	"Plush"	4:16
7.	"Everything I Do Seems to Cost Me $20"	4:38
8.	"Taste All the Fruit"	2:55
9.	"Little Buccaneer"	2:01
10.	"Everywhere I Go I Seem to Spend $20"	1:44

== Personnel ==
Adapted from the Tropic of Scorpio liner notes.

Girls Against Boys

- Alexis Fleisig – drums
- Eli Janney – sampler, production, engineering
- Scott McCloud – lead vocals, guitar
- Johnny Temple – bass guitar

Production and additional personnel

- Nathan Larson – trumpet, backing vocals
- Yuri Martyr – photography
- David Rathbone – charango
- Chris Thomson – backing vocals
- Zeke Weiner – tabla
- Luke Wood – guitar

== Release history ==
Region	Date	Label	Format	Catalog
United States	1992	Adult Swim	CD, CS, LP	AS4
