= Venus Luxure No. 1 Baby =

Studio album by Girls Against Boys
- Released: August 20, 1993
- Recorded: February 1993
- Studio: Oz, Baltimore
- Genre: Post-hardcore; indie rock
- Length: 46:18
- Label: Touch and Go
- Producer: Ted Niceley

Girls Against Boys chronology
Tropic of Scorpio (1992)	Venus Luxure No. 1 Baby (1993)	Sexy Sam (1994)

Venus Luxure No. 1 Baby is the second studio album by the indie rock band Girls Against Boys. It was released in 1993 on Touch and Go Records.

== Production ==
Venus Luxure No. 1 Baby was produced by Ted Niceley. Singer-guitarist Scott McCloud has stated that prior to Venus Luxure No. 1 Baby, his singing was "very heavily influenced" by Rites of Spring-era Guy Picciotto. McCloud began to listen "to other stuff—The Fall, even Velvet Underground" which impacted his vocals on the album and allowed him to developed his own style.

== Release ==
Venus Luxure No. 1 Baby was released on August 20, 1993, by record label Touch and Go.

== Reception ==
Professional ratings
Review scores
Source	Rating
AllMusic	4/5 stars
Robert Christgau	(1-star Honorable Mention)
The Encyclopedia of Popular Music	4/5 stars
MusicHound Rock	3/5 stars
NME	3/5 stars
The Rolling Stone Album Guide	2/5 stars

In his retrospective review, Ned Raggett of AllMusic wrote, "when Girls Against Boys released Venus Luxure, it was clear that the quartet had really turned into something spectacular. Avoiding the clichés of early-'90s indie rock for its own surly, charismatic edge, Girls Against Boys here kicked out the jams like nobody's business." Trouser Press wrote that "Venus Luxure No. 1 Baby is where all the flailing around starts to gel."

== Legacy ==
The album was included in the book 1001 Albums You Must Hear Before You Die.

== Track listing ==
All tracks are written by Girls Against Boys.

No.	Title	Length
1.	"In Like Flynn"	4:25
2.	"Go Be Delighted"	3:57
3.	"Rockets Are Red"	5:03
4.	"Satin Down"	5:56
5.	"Let Me Come Back"	3:24
6.	"Learned It"	3:25
7.	"Get Down"	4:32
8.	"Bulletproof Cupid"	4:51
9.	"Seven Seas"	2:55
10.	"Billy's One Stop"	2:59
11.	"Bug House"	4:51

== Personnel ==
Adapted from the Venus Luxure No. 1 Baby liner notes.

Girls Against Boys

- Alexis Fleisig – drums
- Eli Janney – sampler, bass guitar, vocals, engineering
- Scott McCloud – lead vocals, guitar
- Johnny Temple – bass guitar

Production and additional personnel

- Peter Hayes – cover art
- Drew Mazurek – engineering
- Ted Niceley – production
- Steve Palmieri – engineering

== Release history ==
Region	Date	Label	Format	Catalog
United States	1993	Touch and Go	CD, CS, LP	TG117
United States	2009	Touch and Go	LP	TG117
