= DAAU =

Belgian musical group

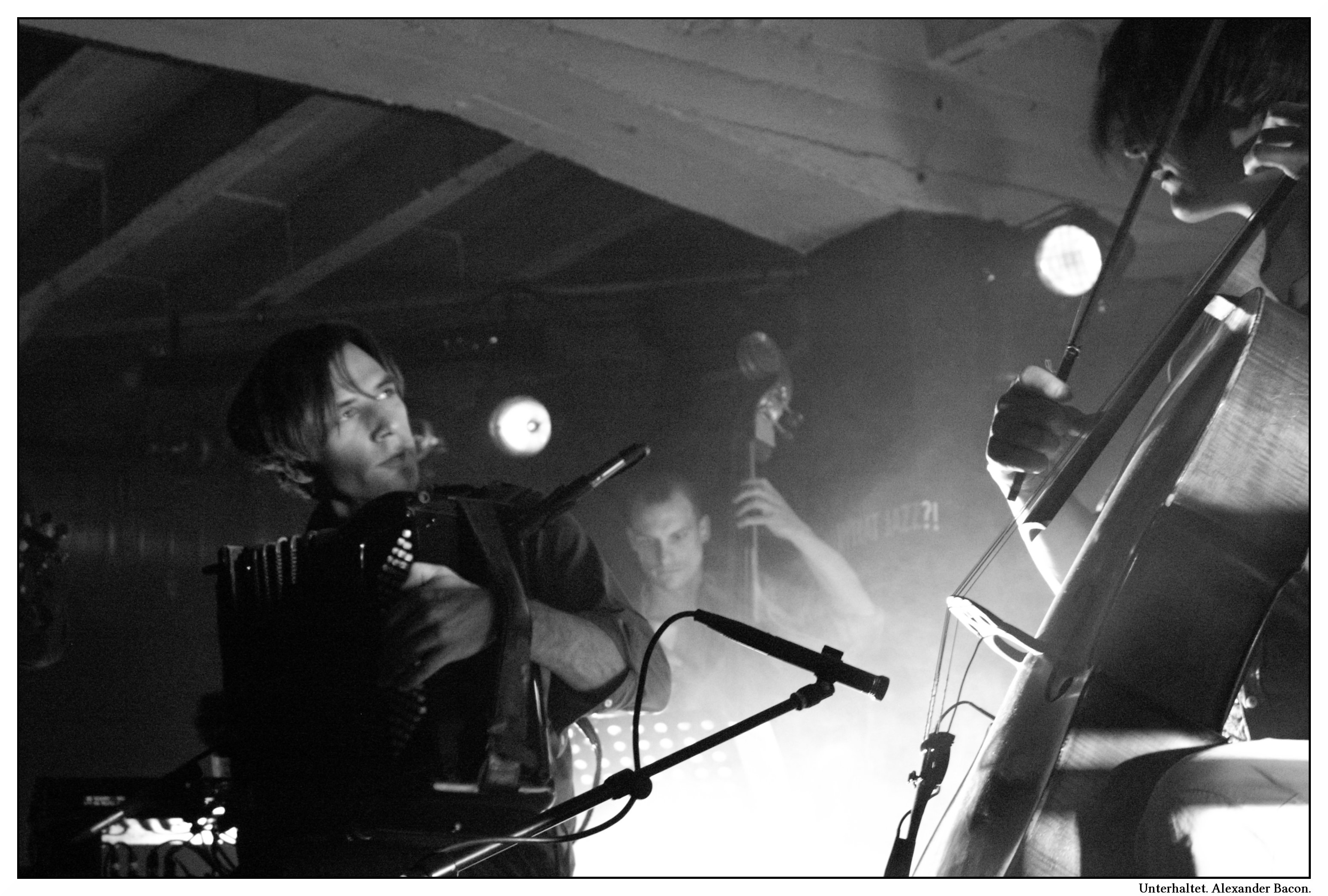
DAAU during the What Jazz!? festival in Hasselt

DAAU (short for Die Anarchistische Abendunterhaltung) is a classical, jazz, experimental and multi-genre music group from Antwerp, Belgium. The band was founded in 1992 and borrowed its name from the novel Der Steppenwolf (1927) by Hermann Hesse.

The current line-up consists of Roel Van Camp (accordion), Han Stubbe (clarinet), Hannes D'Hoine (upright bass) and Jeroen Stevens (drums, marimba). Founding members Buni Lenski (violin) and Simon Lenski (cello) left the band in 2006 and 2013. In the course of DAAU's history, other musicians have joined the quartet for a limited period: Adrian Lenski (piano), Janek Kowalski (drums), Angélique Willkie (vocals), Fré Madou (upright bass) and Geert Budts (drums). On record, the band also collaborated with An Pierlé, Ya Kid K (Technotronic) and David Bovée (Think of One).

== Career ==
In 1994 they debuted with their acoustic self-titled album on the label Jack&Johnny, which also released the first material by Zita Swoon (back then called A Beatband) and dEUS. For dEUS, DAAU also recorded a version of the cult-hit "Suds & Soda".

In 1996 Sony Classical signed the band, re-released the debut album, and released the follow-up We Need New Animals (1998). The album was recorded in the Spanish village Ronda and introduced vocals, electronics, drums and guitar to the sound of DAAU. The band was invited to support 16 Horsepower on tour in Europe. The record sold very few copies and Sony decided to shift the group to Columbia Records, which released their third album Life Transmission (2001) before sacking the group later that year. Even though record sales were once again below expectations, the group scored some small radio-hits and toured extensively in the Benelux and played for large crowds at Rock Werchter and Pukkelpop festivals.

In 2002 the band set up a record label of their own, titled Radical Duke, and released an EP of music they composed for a dance play Richard of York Gave Battle in Vain, also known as Colours. Later a compilation of outtakes and alternative versions was released, titled Ghost Tracks.

Two years later the group returned to the acoustic approach of its early days and released their fourth record Tub Gurnard Goodness, including a cover of Radiohead's "2+2=5". On tour, DAAU expanded itself to a sextet with a new rhythm section. Tub Gurnard Goodness was released in Europe and the group played many concerts in Germany, Czech Republic and in France with electro dub crew Ez3kiel. In Hungary they were present at the Sziget festival, in Denmark at Roskilde Festival.

In 2006 the band released their first record as a sextet, Domestic Wildlife. Shortly after, bass player Fré Madou decided to leave the band. In 2010 the band released The Shepherd's Dream, now as a quartet.

In 2011 Simon Lenski composed and recorded the soundtrack for the short movie Motor by Dutch movie maker Simone Bennett. For this musical piece a special electric twelve string violin was built for him by experimental luthier Yuri Landman. For their work in Last Winter, they received a Magritte Award nomination in the category of Best Original Score.

== Line-up ==
- Buni Lenski (violin) (1992–2006)
- Simon Lenski (cello) (1992–2013)
- Han Stubbe (clarinet) (1992–present)
- Roel Van Camp (accordion) (1992–present)
- Adrian Lenski (piano) (2001–2002)
- Janek Kowalski (drums) (2001–2002)
- Geert Budts (drums) (2004–2006)
- Fré Madou (upright bass) (2004–2006)
- Hannes D'Hoine (upright bass) (2006–present)
- Jeroen Stevens (drums) (2013–present)

== Discography ==
1. Die Anarchistische Abendunterhaltung (1995)
2. We Need New Animals (1997)
3. Life Transmission (2001)
4. Richard of York Gave Battle in Vain (2002)
5. Ghost Tracks (2004)
6. Tub Gurnard Goodness (2004)
7. Domestic Wildlife (2006)
8. The Shepherd's Dream (2010)
9. Eight Definitions (2013)
10. Hineininterpretierung (2017)

== Side-projects ==
- Simon Lenski with Bo Wiget
- Bear Guts Quartet
