= You Can't Fight What You Can't See =

Studio album by Girls Against Boys
- Released: 2002
- Recorded: December 2001
- Genre: Post-hardcore, indie rock
- Label: Jade Tree
- Producer: Ted Niceley

Girls Against Boys chronology
Freak*on*ica (1998)	You Can't Fight What You Can't See (2002)	The Ghost List (2013)

You Can't Fight What You Can't See is the sixth studio album by American post-hardcore/indie rock band Girls Against Boys, released in 2002 by Jade Tree Records. It was their first album released on the label, and also their last release before the band went on hiatus.

It received generally favorable reviews from critics.

== Reception ==
Professional ratings
Aggregate scores
Source	Rating
Metacritic	76/100
Review scores
Source	Rating
AllMusic	4/5 stars
Alternative Press	4/5 stars
Blender	3/5 stars
Robert Christgau	(2-star Honorable Mention)
Entertainment Weekly	B+
NME	6/10
Pitchfork	5.5/10
The Rolling Stone Album Guide	3/5 stars
Spin	8/10

You Can't Fight What You Can't See has received a generally favorable reception from critics. A less favorable review, however, came from Kevin Adickes of Pitchfork, who wrote, "there's not much here to love, which just leaves one to wonder if history will remember any of Girls Against Boys' records beyond 1994's Venus Luxure No. 1 Baby. God knows I won't."

== Track listing ==
1. "Basstation" – 3:44
2. "All the Rage" – 4:02
3. "300 Looks for the Summer" – 3:01
4. "Tweaker" – 3:46
5. "Miami Skyline" - 3:30
6. "Resonance" – 4:24
7. "BFF" – 3:46
8. "Kicking the Lights" – 3:39
9. "One Perfect Thing" – 2:55
10. "The Come Down" – 4:02
11. "Let it Breathe" – 3:48
