= Bob Sullivan (American football, born 1923) =

American football player (1923–1981)

- Sullivan in 1949

Profile
- Positions: Halfback, defensive back

Personal information
- Born: August 15, 1923; Lowell, Massachusetts, U.S.
- Died: June 19, 1981 (aged 57); North Andover, Massachusetts, U.S.
- Listed height: 5 ft 10 in (1.78 m)
- Listed weight: 190 lb (86 kg)

Career information
- College: Holy Cross University

Career history
- San Francisco 49ers (1948)
- Stats at Pro Football Reference

Robert Joseph Sullivan (August 15, 1923 – June 19, 1981) was a walk-on offensive half back and defensive back out of Holy Cross who played for the dominant 1948 San Francisco 49ers under head coach Buck Shaw. The team went 12–2, finishing 2nd in the AAFC West.

At 5'-10" and 190 pounds (86 kg), Sullivan rushed 33 times for 121 yards over 13 games and had 4 receptions for 58 yards. His only touchdown came as a return TD.

Defensively, Sullivan had one interception for a six-yard return.
