= Freak*on*ica =

Studio album by Girls Against Boys
- Released: May 18, 1998
- Recorded: October 1997
- Studio: Seedy Underbelly (Minneapolis)
- Genre: Industrial rock; electronic rock; electronica
- Length: 47:26
- Label: DGC
- Producer: Nick Launay

Girls Against Boys chronology
House of GVSB (1996)	Freak*on*ica (1998)	You Can't Fight What You Can't See (2002)

Singles from Freak*on*ica
- 1. "Park Avenue" Released: May 5, 1998; 2. "Roxy" Released: December 14, 1998; 3. "Psycho Future" Released: February 1999

Freak*on*ica is the fifth studio album by American rock band Girls Against Boys, released on May 18, 1998, through DGC Records. It was their first and only album for a major label. It was produced by Nick Launay.

Freak*On*Ica received moderate success in the US, though its stylistic shift garnered a mixed reception from critics and fans. By 2002, the album had sold 44,000 copies in the United States. Lead singer and guitarist Scott McCloud has described that period as having “an atmosphere of stress. But I remember it coming from me...There were no Geffen people in the studio. All the mistakes that were made were made by us.”

== Production ==
Girls Against Boys' previous album, House of GVSB (1996), exemplified the group's famous post-punk sound but also featured some songs that reflected their emergent interests in trip hop, hip hop and dance music, including "Vera Cruz", "Life in Pink" and "Zodiac Love Team", foreshadowing their primary direction on Freak*on*ica. The group's frontman and guitarist, Scott McCloud, commented on Freak*on*ica: "Our music always had a groove. We decided we wanted to make an electronic-based rock record. In the mid-'90s, that music was exciting. Lots of bands were dabbling in it. We decided to see how we could implement some of those sounds into our next record. We thought, 'We have always loved bands like Depeche Mode, so let's experiment."

McCloud has stated that the album was recorded over the course of two months, whereas their previous records had never taken longer than two weeks. He has also stated that DGC gave the band complete creative freedom, and the group opted to experiment in the studio and diverge from their original sound. According to McCloud, the band felt that, since they were signed to a three-album deal, they "could always follow up Freak*on*Ica with something that sounds more like House of GVSB if this didn’t work."

Critic Ned Raggett compared its crisp and clean "techno-metal" sound to Garbage and noted the use of "weird" blasts of guitar and looped samples of noise. Matt Diehl noted the "post-punk guitars and industrial-strength electronica rhythms" and called it "sci-fi deca-dance" John Mulvey noted that the group's formula still prioritised guitar riffs over songs, dual bass guitars and "muffled samples", but noted the addition of "a pricey industrial-style production in what one suspects is a vain attempt to draw in the Marilyn Manson massive."

== Critical reception ==
=== Contemporaneous reviews ===
Professional ratings
Initial reviews
Review scores
Source	Rating
Entertainment Weekly	A−
The Independent	3/5 stars
Los Angeles Times	3.5/4 stars
Melody Maker	4/5 stars
NME	6/10
Pitchfork	7.7/10
Rolling Stone	3/5 stars
Select	1/5 stars
Spin	7/10
Wall of Sound	71/100

Freak*on*ica received mixed-to-positive reviews from contemporary music critics. Matt Diehl of Entertainment Weekly called it "GVSB's most mesmerizing collection yet", drawing attention to the funky, dystopian sound and Scott McCloud's "evocatively dissolute lyrics". In The Independent, Angela Lewis welcomed the band's return and noted the addition of "Millennium paranoia" to their lyrical themes. She added: "Every song is a bleak cocktail of bad blues, but with an idiosyncrasy that's made them much missed." Brent DiCrescenzo of Pitchfork commented that while the group's decision to eschew their former hardcore label Touch and Go for the major label DGC could invoke accusations of selling out from "indie-rock pundits", their new sound "seems more like a natural progression than a clever ploy to sell more records", and believes their appeal remains in "their ability to write awesome, swinging rock burners that rely more on the band's ace rhythm section than on guitar skills." Paul Rees of Kerrang! wrote that there was "absolutely no way [the album will] make Girls Against Boys the mainstream darlings Geffen would like, but as an exercise in sonic terrorism, it remains state of the art."

The A.V. Club called Freak*on*ica Girls Against Boys' worst album, dismissing the band for "[trading] in its skewed take on dance music for the real thing, and to poor effect." They said: "To its credit, Freak*on*ica is perhaps the best Filter record ever, a fact that should score the band some much-needed airplay on alternative radio. But those looking for a return to past glories should forget it." Jimmy Blackburn of Vox similarly criticized the album as a "poor return" for the band that left them "retreating into commercial mediocrity". NME critic John Mulvey noted several "terrific moments", but suspected that the group had become "bored with what they do" and had nearly exhausted their formula. Bob Gulla of Wall of Sound wrote that the "highly anticipated" album would, according to some, "help to redefine heavy, guitar-based rock for the millennium." However, he disagreed; writing that while the record is worth hearing, much of it explores the "same dark, blank spaces" with few hooks or melodies, contending: "Impressively postindustrial, Freak*on*ica winds up being more admirable than exhilarating, more sudden than enduring."

=== Retrospective reviews ===
Professional ratings
Retrospective reviews
Review scores
Source	Rating
AllMusic	1.5/5 stars
Christgau's Consumer Guide	(neither)
The Encyclopedia of Popular Music	2/5 stars
The Great Indie Discography	6/10
MusicHound Rock	3/5 stars
The Rolling Stone Album Guide	1/5 stars

Later critical reviews were more negative. In his retrospective review, Ned Raggett of AllMusic wrote that Freak*on*ica was "practically a joke, sounding more like a commercial band attempting to cover Girls Against Boys than the group itself"; he criticized Launay's production for smoothing out the band's sound. Writing in The Rolling Stone Album Guide (2004), Arion Berger said that the album "fulfilled the indie cliché of [a band] accepting a major label contract and releasing a weak distillation of its former sound". In his review of Girls Against Boys' follow-up album You Can't Fight What You Can't See (2002), Kevin Adickes of Pitchfork described the album as a "calamity" and a "discotheque disaster". The Encyclopedia of Popular Music (2006) called it "disappointingly pedestrian", whilst Robert Christgau gave it a "Neither" rating in his book Christgau's Consumer Guide: Albums of the 90's (2000).

Writing in 2023, PopMatters critic Bob Stout believes that the album now "sounds like a preview of 21st-century mainstream music, a decadent mix of electronic and guitars with lyrics that read as a tongue-in-cheek critique of the high life. Girls Against Boys sought to make a dance record with guitars, and it delivers on that fully." He commented that the group broke ground in 1998 by "playing riffs that sound like samples and leaning further into synthesizers and the groove-heavy drumming", and that this prefigured how it is now commonplace for pop music to "lean heavily into club music". He concluded: "Given the blending of rock and electronic music that has dominated the pop charts for some time, it becomes clear that Freak*on*Ica was ahead of its time. ... Girls Against Boys weren’t the only band blending electronic and rock music at the time. They were just one of the few doing it seamlessly, whether longtime fans chose to see it or not. Twenty-five years later, it’s likely that Freak*on*Ica would be embraced for the elements that made it so maligned in 1998."

== Track listing ==
1. "Park Avenue" – 3:50
2. "Pleasurized" – 3:39
3. "Psycho-Future" – 3:32
4. "Black Hole" – 4:16
5. "Roxy" - 4:19
6. "One Firecracker" – 3:47
7. "Speedway" – 3:43
8. "Exorcisto" – 3:56
9. "Vogue Thing" – 3:53
10. "Push the Fader" – 4:01
11. "Exile" – 4:20
12. "Cowboy's Orbit" – 4:04

== Charts ==
=== Album ===
Chart (1998)	Peak position
UK Albums (OCC)	182
US Heatseekers Albums (Billboard)	11

=== Singles ===
Year	Chart	Song	Position
1998	UK Singles Chart (OCC)	"Park Avenue"	83
1998	US Mainstream Rock Tracks (Billboard)	"Park Avenue"	28

== Release history ==
Release history for Freak*on*ica
Region	Label	Format	Date	Catalog #	Ref.
Europe	Geffen	CD; CS	May 18, 1998	GED 25156	
United States	DGC	LP	May 19, 1998	DGC2-25156	
United States	DGC	CD; CS	June 2, 1998	DGCD-25156	
