= Simon Lenski =

Belgian cellist, composer and performer

- Lenski in 2018

Background information
- Occupations: Cellist, composer, performer
- Instrument: Cello
- Years active: 1992–present
- Formerly of: DAAU
- Website: simonlenski.com

Simon Lenski is a Belgian cellist, composer and performer from Antwerp, Belgium. He co-founded the ensemble Die Anarchistische Abendunterhaltung (DAAU) in 1992 and remained part of the group until 2013. His later work has included composition for film and theatre, live music and interdisciplinary performance. He has worked with artists and companies including Meg Stuart / Damaged Goods, Wunderbaum, andcompany&Co and Needcompany.

== Career ==
In 1992 Lenski co-founded DAAU, an Antwerp-based ensemble whose music combined elements of classical music, rock, jazz and experimental music. He was the group's cellist for more than two decades before leaving its regular line-up in 2013.

Alongside DAAU, Lenski developed collaborations with other musicians. He worked with Swiss cellist and composer Bo Wiget, with whom he released the album Die Vögelein schweigen im Walde in 2007. In 2009 he collaborated with the Belgian vocal group Laïs on the album and live project Laïs Lenski. He released the solo EP Oh City in 2016.

From the late 2000s onwards Lenski increasingly worked as a composer and musician for film and the performing arts. He was credited for the music of Pieter Van Hees' film Left Bank (Linkeroever, 2008), alongside Eavesdropper. He composed the music for Simone Bennett's short film Motor (2012), for which he and Yuri Landman were also credited with sound design. He later composed the music for Van Hees' Waste Land (2014). Lenski and Senjan Jansen were nominated for an Ensor Award for Best Soundtrack for Waste Land in 2015.

His work for theatre and performance has included music and live performance for Wunderbaum. He composed the music for Venlo (2009), and worked with Bo Wiget on live music and composition for The Haunted House of History (2012). In The Future of Sex (2016), Lenski was responsible for live music and composition. He also provided live music for Meg Stuart / Damaged Goods' Revisited (2007), and worked as a musician and performer with the Berlin-based collective andcompany&Co. In Der (kommende) Aufstand he performed and contributed to the music with composer Sascha Sulimma and Reinier van Houdt, and he later appeared as a musician and performer in Orpheus in der Oberwelt.

Lenski has also collaborated with theatre maker Benny Claessens. He composed the music for Claessens' Hello Useless – for W and friends, produced by CAMPO and co-produced by NTGent. In 2026 he composed the music for Claessens' BÖSES GLÜCK / CULT OF THE DAUGHTER at the Volksbühne in Berlin, which premiered on 26 February 2026.

From 2016 onwards Lenski appeared in productions by Needcompany. In Maarten Seghers' O, Or The Challenge Of This Particular Show Was To Have Words Ending In O he performed alongside Nicolas Field, Mohamed Toukabri, Fritz Welch and Seghers. In Jan Lauwers' stage adaptation of War and Turpentine (2017), Lenski appeared as a chaplain and cellist. He subsequently appeared in All the Good (2019), Grace Ellen Barkey's Probabilities of Independent Events, and The House of Our Fathers / Mothers of Inventions (2020).

In 2018 Lenski performed with Selah Sue in an acoustic trio with pianist and keyboard player Joachim Saerens, including at the North Sea Jazz Festival.

In 2019 Lenski and violinist and harpsichordist George van Dam created Goldberg Variations, a performance based on Johann Sebastian Bach's Goldberg Variations. Van Dam performs the work on harpsichord while Lenski performs as dancer and performer. Part of the project was developed at Theaterhaus Jena, where it was presented under the title BACH! in November 2019, before being presented at the December Dance festival in Bruges in December 2019. A filmed version of the performance was recorded at Monty in Antwerp in December 2020.

Lenski continued his collaboration with George van Dam with Dichterliebe, a performance based on Robert Schumann's song cycle Dichterliebe. The work premiered at Needcompany's MILL in Brussels on 15 October 2021 as part of EXPLO #2: Xenia.

In 2023 Lenski performed in Maarten Seghers' Songs of Disconnection, alongside Aya Suzuki, George van Dam and Michael Schmid.

In 2025 Lenski was part of the ensemble with which Jan Lauwers and Maarten Seghers developed Lee Miller in Hitler's Bathtub, playing cello during the creation of the work. The production premiered at the Vienna State Opera on 1 June 2025.

== Selected works ==
=== Discography ===
For Lenski's recordings with DAAU, see DAAU discography.

- Simon Lenski / Bo Wiget – Die Vögelein schweigen im Walde (2007)
- Laïs Lenski – Laïs Lenski (2009), with Laïs
- Simon Lenski – Oh City (EP, 2016)

=== Film ===
- Left Bank / Linkeroever (2008) – music, with Eavesdropper
- Motor (2012) – music; sound design with Yuri Landman
- Waste Land (2014) – music
- Feel Sad for the Bunny (2015) – music

=== Stage and performance ===
- Revisited – Meg Stuart / Damaged Goods (2007), live music
- Venlo – Wunderbaum (2009), music
- The Haunted House of History – Wunderbaum (2012), live music and composition with Bo Wiget
- Der (kommende) Aufstand – andcompany&Co (2012), performer and music collaborator
- Orpheus in der Oberwelt – andcompany&Co (2014), musician and performer
- O, Or The Challenge Of This Particular Show Was To Have Words Ending In O – Needcompany / Maarten Seghers (2016), performer
- Hello Useless – for W and friends – Benny Claessens / CAMPO (2016), music
- The Future of Sex – Wunderbaum (2016), live music and composition
- War and Turpentine – Needcompany / Jan Lauwers (2017), performer and cellist
- All the Good – Needcompany / Jan Lauwers (2019), performer
- Probabilities of Independent Events – Needcompany / Grace Ellen Barkey (2019), performer and orchestra member
- Goldberg Variations – with George van Dam (2019), concept, performance and dance
- The House of Our Fathers / Mothers of Inventions – Needcompany (2020), performer
- Dichterliebe – with George van Dam (2021), performance
- Songs of Disconnection – Needcompany / Maarten Seghers (2023), performer
- Lee Miller in Hitler's Bathtub – Needcompany / Jan Lauwers / Maarten Seghers (2025), development and cello in touring ensemble
- BÖSES GLÜCK / CULT OF THE DAUGHTER – Benny Claessens / Volksbühne Berlin (2026), music
