= Ted Niceley =

American record producer

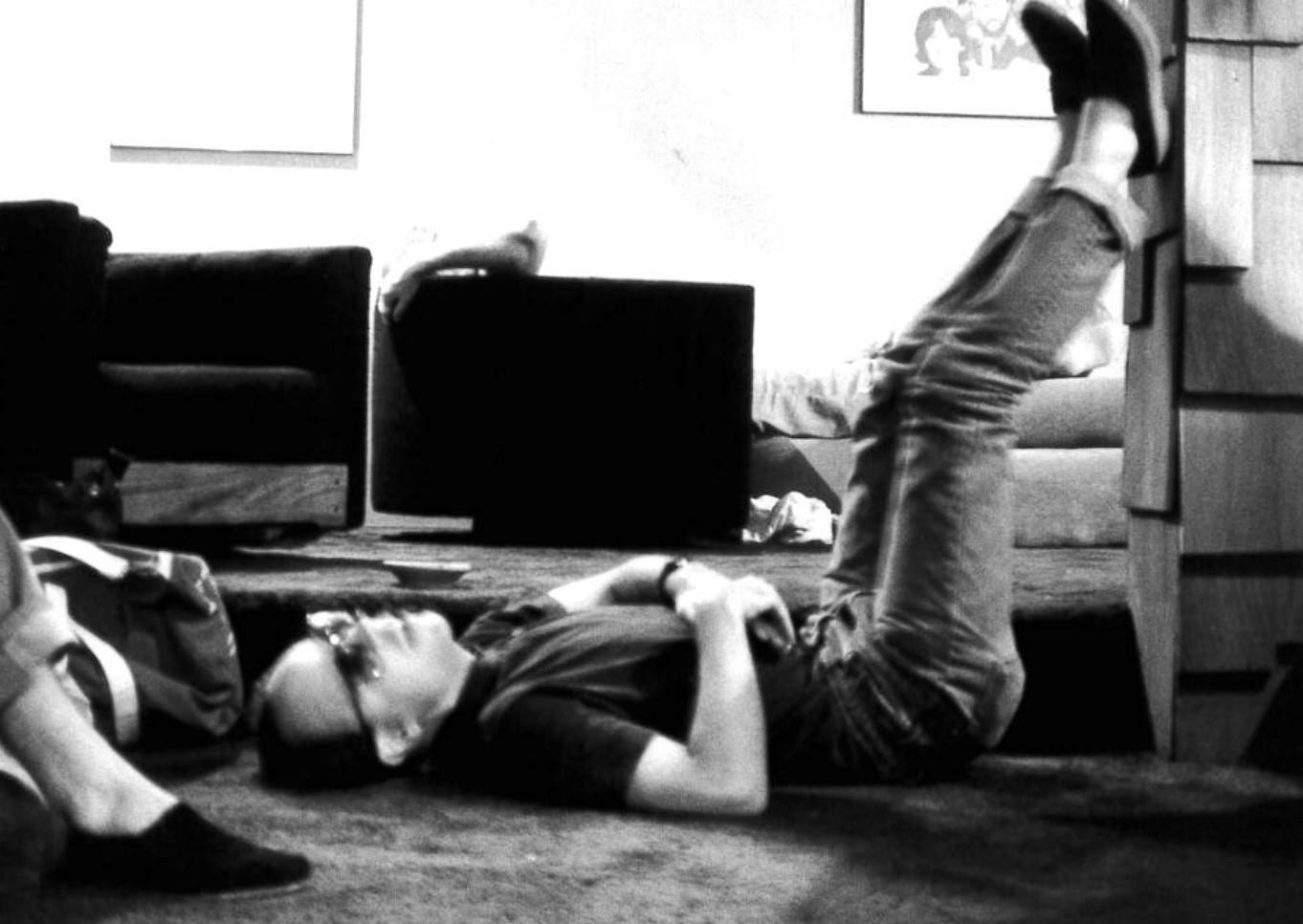
- Ted Niceley reflecting

Background information
- Genres: Rock, post-hardcore, post-punk, alternative rock
- Occupation: producer
- Years active: 1984–present
- Labels: Geffen; Dischord; DeSoto; Touch & Go; Epic
- Website: tedniceley.com

Ted Niceley is an American record producer. He is most known for his production work with Fugazi, Girls Against Boys, Jawbox, Tripping Daisy, and others. Apple Music called Niceley "the D.C. scene-shaper" for his impact on the city's explosive and revolutionary punk scene in the 1980s and 1990s.

== Production credits ==
Select production/engineering/mixing credits include the following:

- Tommy Keene – Strange Alliance (1981) ◦‣
- Tommy Keene – Places That Are Gone (1984) ◦‣
- Fugazi – 13 Songs (1989)
- Fugazi – Repeater (1990)
- The Dead Milkmen – Soul Rotation (1992)
- Noir Désir – Tostaky (1992)
- Noir Désir – Dies Irae (1993)
- Girls Against Boys – Venus Luxure No.1 Baby (1993)
- Fugazi – In on the Kill Taker (1993)
- Magnapop – Kiss My Mouth (1993)
- Shudder to Think – Hit Liquor (1994)
- Girls Against Boys – Cruise Yourself (1994)
- Jawbox – For Your Own Special Sweetheart (1994)
- Shudder to Think – Pony Express Record (1994)
- Stanford Prison Experiment – The Gato Hunch (1995)
- Tripping Daisy – I Am an Elastic Firecracker (1995)
- Ruth Ruth – Laughing Gallery (1995)
- Noir Désir –666.667 Club (1996)
- Frente – Shape (1996)
- Girls Against Boys – House of GVSB (1996)
- Doughboys – Turn Me On (tracks: 2, 4, 5, 8, 10 to 12) (1996)
- Shudder to Think – 50,000 B.C. (1997)
- Stanford Prison Experiment – Wrecreation (1998)
- Girls Against Boys – You Can't Fight What You Can't See (2002)
- Future Kings of Spain – Future Kings of Spain (2002)
- Gâtechien – 4 (2010)
- The Hyènes – Peace & Loud (2012)
- Backbone Party – Beirutopia (2013)
- New Rising Sons –Set It Right (2019) ◦‣

◦‣ Denotes bass performance credit

== Compilation Albums and Singles ==
- Clerks: Music from the Motion Picture : Track: Kill the Sexplayer – Artist: Girls Against Boys (1994)
- Mallrats : Track: Cruise Your New Baby Fly Self – Artist: Girls Against Boys (1995)
- Higher Learning (Soundtrack) : Track: Eye – Artist: Eve's Plum (1995)
