= Bobby Sullivan =

American musician

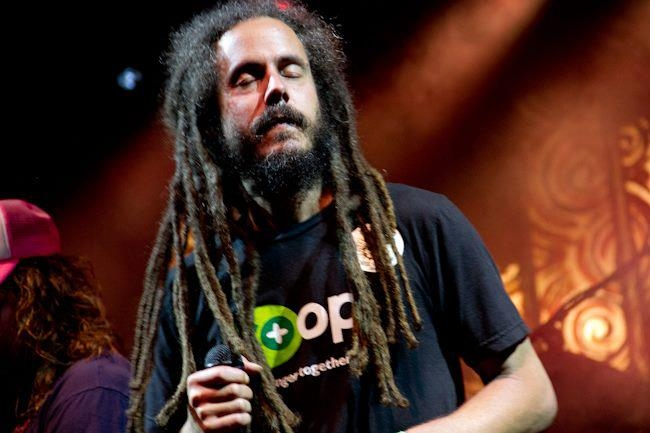
Bobby Sullivan

Bobby Sullivan is a musician and activist.

== Biography ==
He grew up in the Washington, DC punk scene. Forming Soulside in 1983, their first release under the name Lunch Meat was a split 7" with Dave Grohl's first band, Mission Impossible. After the first 7", all their work (three albums and another 7") was produced by Ian MacKaye and released on Dischord Records. Soulside toured extensively in the US, Canada, and Mexico, and toured Europe in 1989, including Eastern Europe.

Soulside were the only American band to play at one of the illegal punk shows held in East Berlin in the 1980s, shows put on in tolerant Lutheran churches against the wishes of the dictatorship and its security organs such as the Stasi. The shows normally featured banned East German groups, and only rarely did international bands appear, traveling into East Berlin on tourist visas and playing in borrowed gear.

After Soulside's split, Sullivan formed 7 League Boots in Boston, a band which blended reggae and rock. After releasing two 7"s and one album on Constant Change/Cargo Records, they broke up and Sullivan joined Rain Like The Sound Of Trains in DC, before forming Sevens with his brother Mark Sullivan. Both bands released albums produced by Tim Kerr.

In his later years, Sullivan became an activist. Mentored by Eric Weinberger, a Civil Rights activist who had been on the Freedom Rides, he worked with Food Not Bombs (soup kitchens for the homeless) for five years in DC and Boston. He also helped form the DC chapter of the Anarchist Black Cross, a political prisoner support network, giving him close relationships with Ramona Africa from the MOVE Organization and various former Black Panthers and Weather Underground members. Today Bobby still makes music with Soulside and recently put out a book called Revolutionary Threads: Rastafari, Social Justice and Cooperative Economics (2018).
