= Johnny Temple (bassist) =

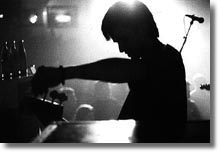
- Temple in 1993

Background information
- Born: Washington D.C.
- Genres: Post-hardcore
- Occupation: Musician
- Instrument: bass guitar
- Years active: 1985–present
- Labels: Dischord, Touch and Go

Johnny Temple is an American bassist, known best for his work in the post-hardcore bands Soulside and Girls Against Boys. Temple also formed a side project with fellow Girls Against Boys member Scott McCloud called New Wet Kojak. In 1996 he founded Akashic Books in Brooklyn with the intent of publishing works by independent artists.

== Biography ==
Johnny Temple grew up on 16th Street Northwest in Washington D.C. In high school, he worked at a reggae record store where his interest in music peaked. In college he studied the history, culture, and politics of Black Americans at Wesleyan University, eventually earning a master's degree in social work at Columbia University in New York City.

It was during his second year that Temple began playing bass guitar, with much of his influence being drawn from the punk rock and reggae scene in D.C.

== Personal life ==
Johnny Temple married in 2002 and has two sons. He has lived in Fort Greene, Brooklyn since 1990 and told The New York Times that one of his "goals in life is to leave Fort Greene as little as possible".

== Discography ==
=== Soulside ===
Year	Title
1988	Trigger
1989	Hot Bodi-Gram

=== Girls Against Boys ===
Year	Title
1992	Tropic of Scorpio
1993	Venus Luxure No.1 Baby
1994	Cruise Yourself
1996	House of GVSB
1998	Freak*on*ica
2002	You Can't Fight What You Can't See

=== New Wet Kojak ===
Year	Title
1995	New Wet Kojak
1997	Nasty International
2000	Do Things
2003	This Is the Glamorous
