= Eli Janney (musician) =

American record producer and engineer

Eli Janney is an American record producer and engineer born in Washington, D.C. Janney played bass and keyboards as well as sang backing vocals in indie rock/post-hardcore band Girls Against Boys. He served as associate music director and was the keyboardist for the Late Night with Seth Meyers house band, the 8G Band from 2014 to 2024. For his contributions to the band as associate director, Janney was nominated for a Primetime Emmy Award for Outstanding Music Direction in 2024. He is also the co-host of SonicScoop's InputOutput Podcast, along with Geoff Sanoff of the band Edsel.

== Biography ==
Janney was born in Washington, D.C.; his brother is Edward Janney. He was active as a musician for Girls Against Boys, and produced recordings with artists like Jawbox, Brainiac, Enon, Skeleton Key, Hooverphonic, Melissa Auf der Maur, Ryan Adams, The Nation of Ulysses, Every Move A Picture and The Rapture. When Girls Against Boys went inactive after 2003, he became a full-time recording and remixing artist for musical artists like James Blunt, Voicst, Nicole Atkins, Satellite Party, Future Kings of Spain and others.
