= Alexis Fleisig =

American musician

- Genres: Post-hardcore
- Occupation: Musician
- Instrument: Drummer
- Years active: 1986–present
- Website: alexisfleisig.com

Alexis Fleisig is an American drummer and photographer, best recognized for his involvement with several D.C.–based bands. Known primarily for his involvement in the post-hardcore group Girls Against Boys, Fleisig was also a founding member of the Soulside and currently performs in Paramount Styles and Bellini.

== Biography ==
Alexis Fleisig gained an appreciation for the drums by listening to classic rock musicians such as Keith Moon, Ringo Starr and John Bonham. Despite reservations, Flesig's father eventually decided to let him buy a drum kit. In 1986 Fleisig joined his first band, a hardcore punk outfit called Lünchmeat. Lünchmeat later changed its name to Soulside and they released several albums on the Washington, D.C.–based independent record label Dischord Records. The group eventually dissolved and Flesig formed Girls Against Boys with two ex-Soulside members, bassist Johnny Temple and vocalist Scott McCloud.

In May 2011, Alexis Fleisig was asked to temporarily fill the spot left by Scott Gursky for the band Obits. Originally just a touring member, Flesig recorded the group's third album, titled Bed & Bugs, in 2013.
