= High Back Chairs =

- Origin: Washington D.C.
- Genres: Power Pop, Indie Rock
- Years active: 1989–1993
- Label: Dischord Records
- Past members: Jeff Nelson; Peter Hayes; Charles Steck; Jim Spellman; Charles Bennington
- Website: https://highbackchairs.bandcamp.com

The High Back Chairs was a band from Washington, DC. Initially consisting of guitarist/vocalist Peter Hayes, guitarist Jim Spellman, bassist/vocalist Charles Steck, and drummer/vocalist Jeff Nelson, the group released its music on the Washington, D.C. punk record label, Dischord Records. The band eschewed the post-hardcore and hardcore punk sounds that Dischord was known for. Instead, the High Back Chairs' music was highly melodic indie rock, owing more to power pop and jangle pop than to the band's punk rock roots. This was all the more notable since Nelson was a co-founder of Dischord and had played in the influential hardcore punk band, Minor Threat from 1980 to 1983. "Coming out at a time when grunge held a lot of sway in Amerindie land," Trouser Press later said of the band, "this breezy, supremely melodic, gutsy rock seemed almost noble."

== Career ==
All four members of the High Back Chairs had been long-time participants in the Washington, D.C. punk subculture before the band was founded in 1989. Hayes had performed in the bands Wonderama and the Mourning Glories (with Lida Husik), as well as contributed to Kurt Sayenga's fanzine, Greed. Steck had been a member of the Velvet Monkeys, Jim Spellman was in Velocity Girl, and Nelson had drummed for Minor Threat, Three, and Senator Flux. Aside from Dischord, Nelson founded another record label, Adult Swim, around the time the High Back Chairs formed. Adult Swim would go on to release music from Girls Against Boys, Holy Rollers, the Snakes, 9353, and others.

Nelson's track record for harder-edged music confused and angered some fans who had expected more of the same with the High Back Chairs. Nelson, however, was vocal in his preference for power pop over hardcore. "I definitely am having more fun playing pop stuff now and having the emphasis on nice melodies and vocal lines," he said. "I'm sure some people would view this as a betrayal, but I definitely view a lot of punk and hardcore and my going through it as going through a stage."

The High Back Chairs released an LP, Of Two Minds, on Dischord Records in 1991. "From the album's first moment," critic and author Mark Jenkins wrote in The Washington Post, "it's clear that the Chairs are what the British call pop—fresh, immediate, sweet but not soft." Recording from November 1990 through April 1991 at Inner Ear Studios, the band and co-producer Ted Niceley occasionally clashed during the sessions for Of Two Minds. "We often overlooked Ted’s impressive credentials and constantly second-guessed him," Hayes recalled The group exceeded the recording budget Dischord provided, and also spent significant time and resources on the album's elaborate artwork, but were ultimately satisfied. "What I really liked about working with Ted was that he had a real long view," Spellman said. "He was there to make a classic record, and he didn’t care about punk rock scene politics or anything else."

Jim Spellman left the band in 1991 in favor of playing full-time for Velocity Girl and was replaced by Charles Bennington, who co-owned WGNS Studios and had previously been a member of Bloody Mannequin Orchestra.

In 1992, the band released a 7", 2 Songs, and an EP, Curiosity and Relief, also on Dischord. "Crisp guitars again rule the day, with more sing-song pop choruses, heavy bass and drums, lulling backing vocals and a '60s-meets-'80s feel," Jack Rabid wrote of the EP for Trouser Press.

Nelson left the band in 1992. "After playing with the High Back Chairs for three years or whatever," he explained, "I could tell it was likely not to go anywhere. I thought we were good, but there was just so much competition from other bands of our ilk. And I was getting married and was going to be serious and have kids, so I hung up my sticks." Nelson was replaced by Blair Lee Elrod but the group soon disbanded in 1993 before releasing any more recordings.

== Discography ==
=== Singles & EPs ===
- 2 Songs (Dischord, 1992)
- Curiosity and Relief (Dischord, 1992)

=== Albums ===
- Of Two Minds (Dischord, 1991)

=== Compilation appearances ===
- "$1.60" on Echos of the Nation's Capital (Third World Underground, 1991)
- "Summer" on 20 Years of Dischord (1980–2000) (Dischord, 2002)
