= Velocity Girl =

American indie rock band

- Also known as: The Gotterdammacrats
- Origin: College Park, Maryland
- Genres: Indie rock; indie pop
- Years active: 1989–1996; 2002; 2023–2024
- Labels: Sub Pop; Slumberland
- Past members: Sarah Shannon; Archie Moore; Kelly Young; Brian Nelson; Jim Spellman; Bridget Cross

Velocity Girl was an American indie rock band formed in 1989 in College Park, Maryland, and active in the Washington, D.C., area. The band released three albums before splitting up in 1996. The band reunited for a one-off concert in 2002 and for a few concerts in 2023 and 2024.

== History ==
=== 1989–1996: Formation and initial run ===
The band started as the duo of Kelly Young (formerly Riles) and guitarist/singer Archie Moore (ex-Black Tambourine) in 1989 (the two having met at the University of Maryland), initially going by the name The Gotterdammacrats. They became Velocity Girl with the addition of Brian Nelson (ex-Black Tambourine, Whorl), Jim Spellman (of High Back Chairs), and lead singer Bridget Cross, who joined Unrest in 1990. The band took its name from a Primal Scream B-side which appeared on the C86 compilation album. Sarah Shannon replaced Cross after the release of the band's debut single, "I Don't Care If You Go."

Unlike some 1990s rock music that featured an abrasive vocal and instrumental style, Velocity Girl's sound, especially post-1993, was more melodic and typically featured "clean" (non-distorted) electric guitar sounds and two-part harmonies. The band described their influences as "the Rough Trade and Postcard labels and some of the early Creation bands", as well as the Wedding Present. However, on their first seven-inch records on Slumberland and Merge, as well as their first Sub Pop album, Copacetic, Velocity Girl were noted for their shoegaze influences. The band was noted for its love of releasing a steady stream of 7-inch vinyl singles. Slumberland Records was formed in 1989 by members of several D.C.-area bands, including Velocity Girl. Velocity Girl's songs often featured female/male vocals, sometimes simultaneously, with Archie Moore providing the male vocals.

Velocity Girl toured frequently, releasing three full-length recordings on the Sub Pop label. Music videos were released for "Crazy Town," (1993),"Audrey's Eyes," (directed by Phil Harder) (1993) "Sorry Again," (1994) "I Can't Stop Smiling," (directed by Spike Jonze) (1994) and "Nothing" (1996). The group disbanded in late 1996 after playing their last show, nicknamed "The Buzz Bakesale", in West Palm Beach, Florida. Shannon, Riles and Spellman reunited in a short-lived project called Starry Eyes, releasing one EP in 1998. Moore had already formed Heartworms before Velocity Girl split up, and later formed The Saturday People with Terry Banks of Tree Fort Angst.

=== Since 2002: Subsequent activity and reunions ===
Sarah Shannon went on to release her self-titled album in 2002. There was one Velocity Girl reunion show played at the Black Cat in Washington, DC on June 9, 2002.

Jim Spellman, since a CGTN correspondent, went on to play guitar in the Washington, D.C.–based power-pop bands Julie Ocean and Foxhall Stacks.

Velocity Girl performed a reunion concert in Washington D.C. for the Black Cat's 30th anniversary celebration on September 9, 2023. A second concert followed at the Bowery Ballroom in New York City on September 30, 2023. After the success of the Black Cat anniversary show, Velocity Girl performed two more shows at the Black Cat in December 2023, with the recently reunited Tuscadero opening.

In September 2023, the band announced they had remixed their debut album Copacetic to better suit how they want the album to sound. In that process, they discovered old recordings with alternate takes, covers, and unreleased material, which the band is reworking for release to streaming services. UltraCopacetic (Copacetic Remixed and Expanded) was released by Sub Pop on August 16, 2024.

== Band members ==
- Archie Moore – guitar, bass, vocals
- Brian Nelson – bass guitar
- Kelly Young (formerly Riles) – guitar, bass
- Sarah Shannon – vocals
- Jim Spellman – drums
- Bridget Cross – vocals (1989–1990)

== Discography ==
=== Albums ===
- Copacetic (1993, Sub Pop)
- ¡Simpatico! (1994, Sub Pop)
- Gilded Stars and Zealous Hearts (1996, Sub Pop)

=== Singles & EPs ===
- "I Don't Care If You Go" b/w "Always" (1990, Slumberland Records/Summershine)
- "My Forgotten Favorite" b/w "Why Should I Be Nice To You?" (1991, Slumberland Records)
- "Crazy Town" b/w "Creepy" (1992, Sub Pop)
- Split with Tsunami (1992, Sub Pop)
- Velocity Girl (1993, Slumberland Records)
- "Audrey's Eyes" b/w "Stupid Thing" (1993, Sub Pop)
- Sorry Again (1994, Sub Pop)
- "Sorry Again" b/w "Marzipan" (1994, Sub Pop)
- "I Can't Stop Smiling" b/w "Marzipan" (1994, Sub Pop)
- "Your Silent Face" b/w "You're So Good To Me" (1994, Merge Records)
- "Seven Seas" b/w "Breaking Lines" (1995, Heaven Records)
- "Nothing" b/w "Anatomy Of A Gutless Wonder" (1996, Sub Pop)
- Split with Chisel (1996, Shute Records)
- Setting the Night on Fire with Rock and Roll (2023, self-released)
- Incidentals (2024, self-released)

=== Compilation appearances ===
- "Clock" on What Kind Of Heaven Do You Want? (1989, Slumberland Records)
- "Blackzilla (live)" on Pre-Moon Syndrome Post-Summer Of Noise (1990, Simple Machines)
- "My Forgotten Favorite" on One Last Kiss (1991, SpinART Records)
- "What You Say" on Screw (1991, Simple Machines)
- "Tales Of Brave Aphrodite" on Fortune Cookie Prize: A Tribute To Beat Happening (1991, Simple Machines)
- "Crawl" on Sassy (1992, Sub Pop)
- "Forgotten Favorite" on ...One Last Kiss (1992, spinART Records)
- "Tales of Brave Aphrodite" on Fortune Cookie Prize (1992, Simple Machines)
- "Merry Christmas, I Love You" on Season's Greetings 7-inch (1992, Simple Machines)
- "Crazy Town" on Spin This 2 (1992, Spin)
- "I Don't Care If You Go" on DC Space R.I.P. (1992, Playhouse Productions)
- "What You Say" on The Machines: 1990–1993 comp. (1993, Simple Machines)
- "Not At All" on Teenbeat 50 (1993, Matador/TeenBeat)
- "Crazy Town" on Say "Hello" To The Far East (1993, Sub Pop)
- "Audrey's Eyes" on Sub Pop Video Network Program II (1993, Sub Pop)
- "Creepy" on Lime Lizard (1993, Lime Lizard)
- "Here Comes", "Always" and "Crazy Town" on John Peel Sub Pop Sessions (1994, Sub Pop)
- "Sorry Again" on CMJ New Music Monthly, Volume 13 (1994, CMJ)
- "I Don't Care If You Go" on Tomorrow's Hits Today (1994, Summershine)
- "I Can't Stop Smiling" on Music Matters Volume 6 (1994, Details)
- "What You" on Echos of the Nation's Capital #2 (1994, Third World Underground)
- "I Can't Stop Smiling" on Life Is Too Short For Boring Music Vol. V (1994, EFA)
- "Sorry Again" on The Album Network's VirtuallyAlternative 47 (1994, The Album Network)
- "I Can't Stop Smiling" on Sub Pop Video Network Program 3 (1995, Sub Pop)
- "My Forgotten Favorite" on Clueless soundtrack (1995, Capitol Records)
- "Finest Hour" on That Virtua Feeling: Sub Pop And Sega Get Together (1995, Sub Pop)
- "Same Old City" on Golden Jam: General Mills' Golden Grahams (1996, EMI)
- "Audrey's Eyes" on Sub Pop Sampler - A Fine Selection of Titles Distributed by Warner Music Canada (1996, Sub Pop)
- "Nothing" on February 96 (1996, Virtuallyalternative)
- "Nothing" on B.L.A.S.T. Modern Rock Program #16 (1996, S.I.N.)
- "Nothing" on Next Magazine 006 (1996, Next Magazine)
- "I Can't Stop Smiling" on Poptopia! Power Pop Classics of the '90s (1997, Rhino)
- "Sorry Again" on Street Mix - Music From Volkswagen Commercials (Volume 1) (2001, Rock River/Universal Music)
- "It's All Right By Me" on Flirt (MP3-only release, 2003)
- "You're So Good To Me" on SCORE! Twenty Years of Merge Records (2009, Merge Records)
- "Seven Seas" on Noise and Fury (2011, Pit Pony)
- "I Don't Care If You Go" on Still In A Dream: A Story of Shoegaze 1988-1995 (2016, Cherry Red)
