= Downward Is Heavenward =

Studio album by Hum
- Released: January 27, 1998
- Recorded: 1997
- Studios: Pogo Studio, Champaign, Illinois
- Genres: Alternative rock; post-hardcore; space rock; alternative metal
- Length: 52:04
- Language: English
- Label: RCA
- Producers: Mark Rubel, Hum

Hum chronology
You'd Prefer an Astronaut (1995)	Downward Is Heavenward (1998)	Inlet (2020)

Singles from Downward Is Heavenward
- 1. "Comin' Home" Released: January 1998; 2. "Green to Me" Released: April 13, 1998

Professional ratings
Review scores
Source	Rating
AllMusic	4.5/5 stars
The A.V. Club	(positive)
The Boston Phoenix	3/4 stars
Chicago Tribune	2/4 stars
Pitchfork	8.3/10
MusicHound Rock	3/5 stars
Punknews.org	4.5/5 stars

Downward Is Heavenward is the fourth studio album by the American post-hardcore/alternative rock band Hum. This was the band’s final album before their initial disbandment in 2000. Their next album Inlet was surprise released in 2020, 22 years after Downward is Heavenward.

== Release ==
Downward Is Heavenward was recorded in 1997, and first released on January 27, 1998, by RCA Records. Some websites such as AllMusic list it as being a 1997 album rather than a 1998 album. "Comin' Home" entered the Billboard Modern Rock Tracks chart on February 14, 1998 at #39. The next week, the song reached its peak position on the chart at #37.

The title of the album appears as a lyric in "Afternoon with the Axolotls".

== Reception ==
Despite selling fewer copies than its predecessor You'd Prefer an Astronaut, the album was critically acclaimed. Brent DiCrescenzo from Pitchfork Media praised the abrasive but graceful nature of the album, writing, "A listen to Downward Is Heavenward actually scrubs off a layer of skin, yet Hum still manage to infuse grace and control into their skyward swirl." Ned Raggett from Allmusic wrote, "Having scored their fluke hit with 'Stars', Hum hunkered down and created a follow-up album that went nowhere, leading to the band's splintering. An unfortunate result all around, because, arguably, Downward Is Heavenward isn't merely the group's best album, but a lost classic of '90s rock, period." In 1999, Pitchfork Media placed the album at #81 on their top 100 albums of the 1990s.

== Track listing ==
1. "Isle of the Cheetah" – 6:38
2. "Comin' Home" – 2:45
3. "If You Are to Bloom" – 5:11
4. "Ms. Lazarus" – 3:38
5. "Afternoon with the Axolotls" – 6:27
6. "Green to Me" – 3:56
7. "Dreamboat" – 6:07
8. "The Inuit Promise" – 6:07
9. "Apollo" – 5:47
10. "The Scientists" – 5:26

Bonus single (received by fans who pre-ordered the album)

1. "Puppets" – 4:11
2. "Aphids" – 6:08

2018 vinyl and 2023 CD release bonus tracks

11. "Puppets" – 4:11
12. "Aphids" – 6:08
13. "Boy with Stick" – 5:42

== Personnel ==
=== Hum ===
- Jeff Dimpsey – bass guitar
- Tim Lash – guitar
- Bryan St. Pere – drums
- Matt Talbott – guitar, vocals

=== Additional personnel ===
- Mark Rubel – production
