= Next Magazine =

Next Magazine may refer to:

- Next Magazine (Hong Kong and Taiwan), formerly published news magazines
- Next Magazine (New York City), an LGBT nightlife magazine
- Next Magazine (Santa Monica), a music industry trade publication
