= Kurt Sayenga =

Writer, director, and producer

- Education: University of Michigan
- Occupations: Writer, director, producer
- Years active: 1992–present
- Awards: Emmy Award
- Website: http://kurtsayenga.com/

Kurt Sayenga is a Los Angeles-based writer, director, and producer. He has served as the principal creative on many high-end documentary projects, most recently as showrunner for the 2023 National Geographic/Hulu/Disney+ special Titanic: 25 Years Later with James Cameron (which generated an enormous amount of press) and director/writer/showrunner of the 2022 eight-part Shudder miniseries The 101 Scariest Horror Movie Moments of All Time (Shudder's most-watched title for the year and winner of the 2023 Fangoria Chainsaw Award for Outstanding Achievement in Horror Film and Television).

Sayenga ran all three seasons of AMC-TV's Eli Roth's History of Horror, writing and directing its 19 hour-long episodes and conducting over 200 interviews for it. The series was awarded a 2020 Reelscreen Award for Non-Fiction Arts and Cultural Program. Interviewees include a host of filmmakers, authors, and scholars including Stephen King, Quentin Tarantino, Cate Blanchett, Geena Davis, Edgar Wright, Bill Hader, Megan Fox, Ari Aster, Rob Zombie, Greg Nicotero, Nancy Allen, Diablo Cody, Jack Black, Tippi Hedren, John Landis, Jamie Lee Curtis, Jordan Peele, Doug Jones, Andy Muschietti, Barbara Muschietti, Joe Dante, Roger Corman, Richard Donner, Dean Cundey, Robert Englund, Tobin Bell, Tony Todd, Stuart Gordon, Bryan Fuller, Howard Shore, Mary Harron, Tom Savini, Joe Hill, Victor LaValle, Bruce Campbell, Leonard Maltin, and Leigh Whannell. Sayenga also produced seasons two and three of the Shudder podcast Eli Roth's History of Horror Uncut, which is based on interviews conducted for the television series.

Previously, Sayenga ran the eight-part National Geographic docuseries Origins, hosted by Jason Silva, and was EP/showrunner for the first two seasons of the science anthology series Breakthrough, a coproduction of National Geographic Channel, GE, Imagine Entertainment, and Asylum Entertainment. Breakthrough featured films helmed by notable directors and actors including Ron Howard, Paul Giamatti, Angela Bassett, Peter Berg, Akiva Goldsman, Ana Lily Amirpour, David Lowery, Shane Carruth, and The Malloys. Narrators included Howard, Bassett, Giamatti, Adrien Brody (2016 Primetime Emmy Award nomination for Outstanding Narrator), Chris Pine, J.K. Simmons, and Mike Colter. Sayenga wrote and co-directed several episodes.

As an executive producer at Revelations Entertainment, Sayenga wrote, directed, and produced 15 episodes of the Emmy-nominated series Through the Wormhole with Morgan Freeman.

== Biography ==
Throughout his young adulthood Sayenga was active in the Washington, D.C. punk music scene. He created, edited, and was the head writer of Greed Magazine in the late 1980s, one of the first magazines to fuse coverage of underground music, literature and "high" and "low" art. On the pop culture side, Greed featured interviews with acts such as Sonic Youth, Pussy Galore, Daniel Johnston, The Swans, Wire, Plasticland, Rites of Spring, Live Skull, and Robyn Hitchcock, plus comics figures Los Bros Hernandez, Charles Burns, Peter Bagge, Chester Brown and Clive Barker. Greed featured the debut of Evan Dorkin's Milk and Cheese in its final issue.

Sayenga also designed albums for the Dischord Records label, most notably Fugazi's first six packages: Fugazi, Margin Walker, 13 Songs, Repeater, Steady Diet of Nothing, and the 7" 3 Songs.

A graduate of the University of Michigan College of Literature, Science & the Arts, Sayenga won the Jules and Avery Hopwood Award for Drama and the Roy M. Cowden Fellowship.

His television career started at the Discovery Channel, where he wrote, directed and produced the special Nighthawk: Secrets of the Stealth Fighter, the mini-series Wings Over the Gulf, and the 13-part series Fields of Armor, a survey of mechanized warfare in the 20th Century. He won an Emmy for the design of the opening credits of Fields of Armor, along with several writing and producing awards.

During his time running the production company Arcwelder Films (which he founded with Martha Adams), Sayenga wrote, directed and produced many more documentaries, including Spies Above, Robots Rising, Explosive Situations, High Speed Impacts, Inside the Kill Box (made on the tenth anniversary of the first Gulf War and featuring interviews with players such as George H. W. Bush and Dick Cheney), and the engineering series Skyscrapers: Going Up, Bridges: Reaching Out, and Tunnels: Digging In. He was also showrunner of Animal Nightmares, a 13-part series for National Geographic International; and Microkillers, a mini-series for National Geographic about pandemic diseases that fused fictional scenarios with documentary content.

In 2006 Sayenga formed a new production company called Command and Control Creative Services, which has produced ancillary content for companies such as 20th Century Fox International, United Artists/MGM, and Disney. In 2008 Sayenga worked with Bill Nye, the Science Guy, as executive producer/showrunner of Stuff Happens, for Discovery Communications' Planet Green. He has also produced several science-based pieces with Nye for Disney Educational Products and The Planetary Society.
