= Electra 2000 =

- The cover to Electra 2000+1, the re-release with copper lettering

Studio album by Hum
- Released: October 19, 1993
- Recorded: 1993
- Studios: Idful, Chicago, Illinois
- Genres: Post-hardcore; alternative rock; alternative metal
- Length: 44:20
- Language: English
- Label: 12 Inch/Cargo
- Producers: Brad Wood; Hum

Hum chronology
Fillet Show (1991)	Electra 2000 (1993)	You'd Prefer an Astronaut (1995)

Professional ratings
Review scores
Source	Rating
AllMusic	2/5 stars
MusicHound Rock: The Essential Album Guide	2.5/5 stars

Electra 2000 is the second studio album by the American alternative rock band Hum. Originally released in 1993 by 12 Inch Records, the first run was limited to 1,000 copies had the band's name printed in black lettering. The album also included "Monty Python Organ Grinder," an instrumental Monty Python song included as a secret track. The second release contains the same track listing as the first, but slightly different cover art, with red lettering rather than black. The album was released for a third time in 1997 by Martians Go Home and contains "Diffuse" as the final track. The song was recorded during the Electra 2000 sessions, but was initially released on the various artists compilation Feast of the Sybarites.

A music video was produced for "Iron Clad Lou."

== Critical reception ==
In a retrospective review, Tiny Mix Tapes called Electra 2000 "the group’s heaviest and most relentless album." Trouser Press called the album "bracingly loud but generically obvious in its attack: simple melodies kicked along with a brisk backbeat and covered in sizzling sensual guitar aggression."

== Track listing ==
All tracks written by Hum.

1. "Iron Clad Lou" – 5:51
2. "Pinch & Roll" – 3:26
3. "Shovel" – 4:30
4. "Pewter" – 4:09
5. "Scraper" – 3:20
6. "Firehead" – 3:30
7. "Sundress" – 3:57
8. "Double Dip" – 5:16
9. "Winder" – 14:18

On the original release "Winder" lasts 5:44, with a hidden track, "Monty Python Organ Grinder", beginning at 6:08. This was omitted from subsequent pressings.

Re-release bonus track

10. "Diffuse" – 4:34

== Personnel ==
Hum

- Jeff Dimpsey – bass guitar
- Tim Lash – guitar
- Bryan St. Pere – drums
- Matt Talbott – guitar, vocals

Additional personnel

- Andy Hodge – artwork
- Mike Starcevich – photography
- Brad Wood – engineering, mixing, production
