= Copacetic =

Copacetic may refer to:

- Copacetic (Velocity Girl album), 1993
- Copacetic (Knuckle Puck album), 2015
