= Waiting Room (song) =

1988 song by Fugazi

Song by Fugazi

from the EP Fugazi
- Released: 1988
- Recorded: June 1988
- Studio: Inner Ear Studios (Arlington, VA)
- Genre: Post-hardcore; post-punk
- Length: 2:53
- Label: Dischord Records
- Producers: Ted Niceley, Fugazi

"Waiting Room" is a song by the American post-hardcore band Fugazi. The song was first released as the opening track to their debut EP, and was later compiled on their commercially successful 1989 compilation 13 Songs. Featuring stylistic influences from funk, hip-hop and reggae, the song typifies Fugazi's signature style of post-hardcore and would go on to become one of their most popular and widely covered songs despite never being released as a single.

== Background ==
The song was inspired by the short-lived nature of (then-lead vocalist) Ian MacKaye's previous band Embrace. Wanting to ensure the longevity of his new project, he was "absolutely determined that he was not going to make the same mistakes this time around [...] It's his song about waiting for the right people and the right moment."

== Versions ==
The earliest recorded version of the track appears on the first installment of the Fugazi Live Series (the band's first live show, a benefit concert for Positive Force), recorded at the Wilson Center in Washington, D.C., on September 3, 1987. Guy Picciotto hadn't yet joined the band. Months later, in January 1988, the band recorded a studio version of the song with Don Zientara, which ended up on their first demo tape.

The definitive and most well-known version of the song was recorded in June that year with Ted Niceley at Inner Ear Studios. Initially released on their self-titled debut EP, the track would also appear on 13 Songs.

== Composition ==
The early versions of the song were described as being slower and "dirge"-like, while the definitive version has an "andante moderato" ("walking" to "moderate") tempo of 92 BPM. With a time signature of 4/4, the song is performed in the key of D♭ minor.

Stylistically, Andy Kellman of AllMusic noted the song's "relentless ska/reggae-inflicted drive", calling its sudden "drop into silence that occurs at the 22-second mark" attention-grabbing. Joe Lally's bass riff on the song has been described as "circular", funk-influenced and "catchy". Merely a backing vocalist at this point in the band, Guy Picciotto's contributions to the song have earned comparisons to that of Flavor Flav of Public Enemy, in that he acts as a "foil" to MacKaye. The song's "tense [...] verses explode into a heavy metallic chorus" in a way reminiscent of an "impatient call to action" even though thematically, the song "is about carefully getting one's ducks in a row".

== Reception ==
The song has been widely acclaimed as one of the band's best and most popular songs. According to Blake Butler: "Ask the common punk rock listening kid, who may not know too much about music, what they know of Fugazi and they will probably mention fairly soon the impact that hearing "Waiting Room" had on them." A similar point was made by Verbicide, who wrote that the song "is to Fugazi what 'Smells Like Teen Spirit' is to Nirvana—the one song that you know, even if you know no others." "While the band's sound would continue to grow over the arc of its existence," wrote Jes Skolnik for Pitchfork, "Waiting Room" is the song that first defined them, and continues to reverberate with fans new and old." It has even been called "the band's de facto "hit song"." According to Quicksand lead singer Walter Schreifels, "everything that's great about Fugazi is spelled out within the first verse and chorus of ‘Waiting Room.’ Within the first 15 seconds of the song, you knew you didn't need to compare it to Minor Threat anymore. [That song] was an event that changed the meaning of everything that came before it."

== Legacy ==
=== Covers and samples ===
How many times has Washington, D.C., endured a Fugazi cover from a touring band? Specifically, how many times has Washington, D.C., endured a cover of "Waiting Room"? Too many times. It's okay, we get it: "Waiting Room" is a jam.

— Lars Gotrich, NPR

The song has been covered "by a remarkably diverse roster of artists" since its release in 1988. "In the quarter-century since it was first performed," writes Verbicide Magazine in an article listing ten different covers of the track, "“Waiting Room" has become a go-to song for rock bands looking to ingratiate themselves to an audience and gain some cred, as well as those simply wishing to share their love of a band that flies under the radar of the mainstream." The Washington Post had even labelled 2011 as "the year of the Fugazi cover" due to the number of bands and musicians that had covered the song (as well as others by the band) that year.

"Waiting Room" has been covered—both live and otherwise—by Red Hot Chili Peppers, Rancid, Arcade Fire, Mustard Plug, the Wildhearts, Ryan Adams, Atom and His Package, Minus The Bear, Billy Talent, Anti-Flag, Dead Milkmen, The Ex, Jimmie's Chicken Shack, The Cryptkeeper Five, Osaka Popstar, Rubblebucket, Awolnation, TV on the Radio, and many others.

Both MC Lars and Girl Talk have sampled the song on their tracks "No Logo" and "Let It Out" respectively. Mike Doughty of Soul Coughing references the song's bridge on the track "Casiotone Nation" off of their 1994 debut Ruby Vroom.

=== In popular culture ===
The song is frequently played at Washington Commanders football games at FedExField. Actor Jack Black has lip-synched to the song as a part of his #RadOnes series of lip-sync videos.

=== Accolades ===
Publication	Country	Accolade	Rank
Beats Per Minute	US	The Top 100 Tracks of the 1980s	31
Blender	US	The 1001 Greatest Songs to Download Right Now!	*
Pitchfork	US	The 200 Best Songs of the 1980s	16
Pitchfork	US	The Pitchfork 500	*
PopMatters	US	The 100 Best Songs Since Johnny Rotten Roared	62
PopMatters	US	The 100 Greatest Alternative Singles of the '80s	84
Robert Dimery	US	1001 Songs You Must Hear Before You Die	*
Kerrang!	UK	666 Songs You Must Own: The Ultimate Playlist ("Post-Hardcore/Emo")	1
NME	UK	The 500 Greatest Songs of all Time	411

* denotes an unordered list.

== Personnel ==
- Ian MacKaye – vocals, guitar
- Guy Picciotto – vocals
- Joe Lally – bass
- Brendan Canty – drums
