= Inlet (album) =

Studio album by Hum
- Released: June 23, 2020
- Recorded: 2017–2020
- Studios: Earth Analog and ELL, Champaign, Illinois
- Genres: Shoegaze; post-hardcore
- Length: 55:31
- Language: English
- Labels: Earth Analog Records; Polyvinyl
- Producer: Hum

Hum chronology
Downward Is Heavenward (1998)	Inlet (2020)

Inlet is the fifth studio album by the Champaign, Illinois alternative rock band Hum. It was surprise-released digitally to Bandcamp on June 23, 2020. The album has been received positively by critics. It is the final album to feature original drummer Bryan St. Pere who died on June 29, 2021.

== Recording and release ==
This is the band's first release since 1998's Downward Is Heavenward and was recorded over several years. The individual band members had a few other musical ventures in the 2000s and the band intermittently reformed for festival appearances and short tours but began work in earnest on a new album coincidental to the 20th anniversary of Downward Is Heavenward in 2018. Inlet was surprise-released digitally to Bandcamp on June 23, 2020.

The album cover features an edited photograph of Rainbow Bridge National Monument in southern Utah.

== Reception ==
Professional ratings
Aggregate scores
Source	Rating
Metacritic	87/100
Review scores
Source	Rating
AllMusic	4.5/5 stars
The Daily Californian	5/5 stars
Exclaim!	8/10
Our Culture Mag	4/5 stars
Pitchfork	7.8/10
Under the Radar	8.5/10
VultureHound	5/5 stars

According to the review aggregator Metacritic, Inlet received "universal acclaim" based on a weighted average score of 87 out of 100 from six critic scores.

Matt Collar from AllMusic was amongst those commending the album, calling it "a dynamic return to form that evokes the fuzz-tone emotionality of their '90s albums". In a brief write-up for Consequence of Sound, John Hadusek opined that this album follows from the band's previous work but has them sounding their "heaviest and most metal". Stereogum's Annie Zaleski praised the performance and the technical merits of the recording, writing that the "production is rich and ear-pleasing, amplifying Hum’s luxurious dynamics and complex arrangements in ways at which their past albums only hinted". Andrew Sacher of Brooklyn Vegan wrote that the album further cemented the band's legacy and that Inlet "is the album that this distinct subgenre needed". Writing for VultureHound, Timothy Stockwell gave the release five out of five stars, focusing on the instrumental work with "chugs and riffs carry a lot of weight moving songs forward without feeling overdone" as well as emotional vocals, summing up "there is not one dull moment over the lengthy tracks".

Pitchfork's Ian Cohen gave the release a 7.8, calling Inlet "their most emotionally accessible music yet". Writing for The Daily Californian, Pooja Bale gave the release five out of five, summing up, "Inlet is a raw display of emotion, a marrying of multiple genres that don’t always go well together. It’s of an otherworldly nature, transporting anyone who ventures inside back to Hum’s prime in the 1990s. But Inlet is not only a means to lift off from the concreteness of the current world—it’s a means to ultimately grow closer to it." In Under the Radar, Ian King rated Inlet an 8.5 out of 10, concluding, "Hum are now a prime example among the bands from their generation that have made good on unfinished business and shown there are different ways to have longevity in music". Konstantinos Pappis of Our Culture Mag gave the album four out of five stars, calling this their most "solid" collection of songs yet, and praising Matt Talbott's lyrics, "Hum’s signature blend of shoegaze, alternative metal, and post-hardcore may have now become a staple for many acts, but where others use it as a backdrop for epic tales spanning through the ages, Talbott’s lyrics turn inwards". Tom Piekarski in Exclaim! gave Inlet an eight out of 10 and compared this to previous Hum albums by writing that this release "does more" and "exudes grace", adding to the complexity, heaviness, and catchiness of the band's output.

Several publications listed Inlet among notable releases of the week, including All Songs Considered from NPR, Brooklyn Vegan, and Mic.com. Bandcamp made it album of the day on June 29. Noisey listed it as one of 26 essential 2020 albums readers may have missed on July 15 of that year.

== Track listing ==
All tracks are written by Hum.

Inlet track listing
No.	Title	Length
1.	"Waves"	5:30
2.	"In the Den"	6:45
3.	"Desert Rambler"	9:01
4.	"Step into You"	4:04
5.	"The Summoning"	8:31
6.	"Cloud City"	5:17
7.	"Folding"	8:19
8.	"Shapeshifter"	8:01
Total length:		55:31

== Personnel ==
Hum

- Jeff Dimpsey – bass guitar, design
- Tim Lash – guitar, engineering, mixing at ELL, design
- Bryan St. Pere – drums, design
- Matt Talbott – guitar, vocals, engineering, design

Additional personnel

- Sheila Metzner – photography
- Maruice Mikkers – photography
- Ohio Girl – design
- Ryan Smith – mastering at Sterling Sound, Nashville
- James Treichler – engineering

== Charts ==
Chart performance for Inlet
Chart (2020)	Peak position
US Billboard 200	111
