= Hum (band) =

American alternative rock band

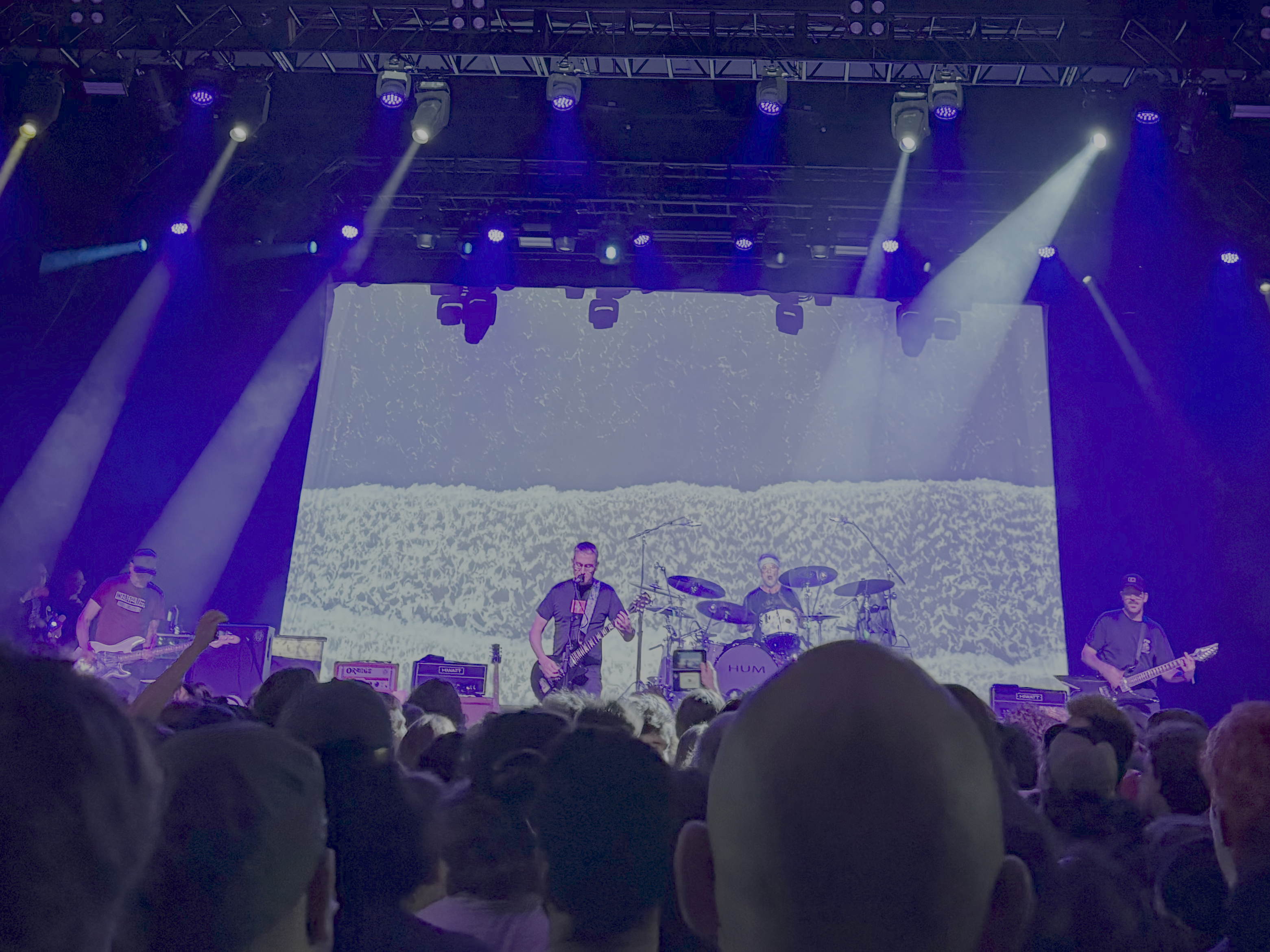
- Hum performing in 2026

Background information
- Origin: Champaign, Illinois, U.S.
- Genres: Alternative rock; alternative metal; post-hardcore; space rock
- Years active: 1989–2000; 2003; 2005; 2008–2013; 2015–present
- Labels: Mud; 12 Inch; Cargo; RCA; Martians Go Home; Earth Analog; Polyvinyl
- Members: Matt Talbott; Jeff Dimpsey; Tim Lash; Jason Gerken
- Past members: Andy Switzky; Akis Boyatzis; Jeff Kropp; Bryan St. Pere; Joe Futrelle; Rod Van Huis; Baltie de Lay

Hum is an American alternative rock band from Champaign, Illinois, formed in 1989. The band's longtime lineup consisted of lead vocalist and rhythm guitarist Matt Talbott, bassist Jeff Dimpsey, lead guitarist Tim Lash and drummer Bryan St Pere.

Best known for their 1995 radio hit "Stars", the band released four albums, including two on major label RCA – You'd Prefer an Astronaut (1995) and Downward Is Heavenward (1998) – before disbanding in 2000. Hum sporadically reunited for shows throughout the 2000s before embarking on full tours in 2015. In 2020, the band surprise-released Inlet, their first album in 22 years. Longtime drummer Bryan St. Pere died unexpectedly in 2021, and after a period of silence, Hum returned to live performances in 2026.

== History ==
=== Founding and early recordings ===
The initial lineup of the band formed in 1989, with guitarist Andy Switzky, guitarist Matt Talbott, bass guitarist Akis Boyatzis and drummer Jeff Kropp. Talbott and Switzky met at a cafe named Treno's, in Urbana, Illinois, where Switzky worked. Discussions about music led to the two forming the nucleus of Hum. Talbott had previously played in the local group We Ate Plato and was presently a member of Honcho Overload; Switzky had performed in the semi-serious live band Obvious Man and had studio experience with Designer Mustard Gas.

The group performed at Akis' basement for their initial months. At the suggestion of Rick Valentin of Poster Children, the band chose the name Hum (over contenders like Grendel's Arm, Pod, and Feedbag), an intentional vague description of their sound and went through a second drummer before overhearing Bryan St. Pere playing along to a Rush record out of his apartment window and recruiting him.

This lineup was not to last long, though, as Boyatzis left home for Greece in 1990. Local musician Joe Futrelle, who played with Switzky in Designer Mustard Gas joined briefly, before leaving for more serious musical pursuits and was replaced by Rod van Huis, later of Steakdaddy Six. For personal reasons, he amicably left the band and went on to perform in the Great Crusades. With the addition of Balthazar "Baltie" de Lay, of the band Mother (later Menthol), the band recorded their first demo in famed engineer Steve Albini's basement in Chicago.

The band recorded eight songs in first or second takes, with only vocal overdubs and had an official demo to shop around, named Kissing Me Is Like Kissing an Angel. At this point, Switzky was the group's primary singer, guitarist and songwriter, which remained the case when their first album, Fillet Show, was released by local label 12 Inch Records in 1991. The album features a faster, heavy sound somewhere between punk rock and heavy metal, with more overt political and humorous material than the later oblique lyrics that Matt Talbott would write.

Pressure grew on de Lay to focus his efforts on Mother and other pursuits, so he too left on good terms with the other members of Hum. Left without a bassist again, Talbott suggested Jeff Dimpsey, his bandmate in Honcho Overload. In that group, and during his brief stint with the Poster Children, Dimpsey played guitar and Talbott actually played bass, but the transition was smooth, and the band recorded two singles, "Hello Kitty" and "Sundress", the former on 12 Inch, and the latter on the new Champaign-based label Mud Records. Around this time, the Champaign scene started to coalesce with members of one band joining up with members of another to form an indefinite amount of one-off side projects, and the Parasol Records distribution company helped promote local acts nationally and brought in alternative music to record stores in Champaign, Illinois.

In the interim between these singles and the next album, creative differences grew between members of the band, and Switzky left. The remaining members recruited a local fan named Tim Lash, almost a decade their junior, to play guitar. His previous experience had been in a speed metal group The Grand Vizars (with Joe Ludwinski from Scurvine and Matt Friedburger from The Fiery Furnaces), and once casually remarked to the band after a show that if they ever needed a guitarist, they could give him a call.

=== Mainstream success ===
The classic lineup of the band was in place, and the quartet headed to Idful Studios with Brad Wood producing Electra 2000. The album was released in its first two pressings by 12 Inch Records and distributed through Cargo Records. The lyrics were far more non-linear and conceptual, and introduced some of the space and science imagery that would dominate later songs. The album produced no singles, but due in no small part to distribution by Parasol, caught the attention of representatives from RCA Records. The band was signed, and hooked up with local club owner and sometimes-musician Ward Gollings as tour manager. They switched to producer Keith Cleversley for their major-label debut You'd Prefer an Astronaut in 1995. The album would produce their biggest hit, the single "Stars", which ended up peaking at No. 11 on the Billboard Modern Rock Tracks chart and No. 28 on the Billboard Mainstream Rock Tracks chart. They also supported the album with promotional appearances on Space Ghost Coast to Coast, The Howard Stern Show, 120 Minutes, and a video that was included in an episode of Beavis and Butthead. The album swiftly sold 250,000 copies, and Hum played their largest dates promoting the record. Further singles "The Pod" and the promotional "I'd Like Your Hair Long" failed to generate much interest, and the band spent much of the rest of the year and 1996 on the road.

In late 1997, they teamed with Mark Rubel at Pogo Studios to record their fourth album, Downward Is Heavenward. The biggest promotion for the album came with an appearance on Modern Rock Live on January 25, 1998, and the album was released in February. Singles "Green to Me" and "Comin' Home" were promotional-only; however, "Comin' Home" would land Hum another appearance on the Billboard Modern Rock Tracks chart, peaking at No. 37. On June 14, 1998, while touring near Winnipeg in Canada, the band's van was broadsided and destroyed, and the rest of the tour was canceled. By the end of the year, the band had only sold 30,000 copies of the album. Around this time, the band missed out on an opportunity to record live favorite the Police's "Invisible Sun" for The X-Files film soundtrack. At the last minute, Sting and Aswad decided to record a reggae cover, keeping the band from a large potential fan base. Due to disappointing sales, and large record label mergers, the band was dropped from their contract in 2000. On tour that year, the band was involved in yet another van accident, signaling the last straw. They played their final shows in 2000 on December 29 in St. Louis, Missouri and December 31 in Chicago.

=== Post-Hum projects ===
Talbott formed Centaur with local musicians Derek Niedringhaus and Jim Kelly. The former had been in Castor and Sarge, who had been produced by Talbott, and the latter was involved with Parasol and drummed in 16 Tons and Love Cup. To date, only one album has been released, In Streams, on the Martians Go Home label, set up by the band themselves to release the vinyl version of Downward Is Heavenward and the re-release of Electra 2000 on CD. A second is being produced. Talbott produces in his studio Great Western Recorders, now Earth Analog Records and has started a family. He also taught at Millikin University in Decatur, Illinois. Talbott is also currently contributing to Open Hand, on Trustkill Records, and contributed vocals to First Days of Spring from the Neverending White Lights album Act 1: Goodbye Friends of the Heavenly Bodies, released in 2005.

Dimpsey resurrected a side-project from 1997, National Skyline with Jeff Garber, also of Castor. This outfit put out a self-titled album, the ep Exit Now, and a second full-length, This = Everything. The band was also featured on the Parasol compilation Sweet Sixteen, Volume 2. He moved to Texas to pursue his career. Dimpsey is currently playing with Adam Fein (Absinthe Blind) in a new band called Gazelle.

Lash has played in other groups after Hum, the electronic duo Glifted with T. J. Harrison of Love Cup, and Balisong, a heavy rock trio with local musicians Eric Steckler and Joe Ludwinski. To date, Glifted have released Under and In on Martians Go Home. A follow-up album was reported to be in production by Lash, but in 2008 he confirmed that Glifted was no more. Balisong never recorded anything, but played a few live shows in Champaign. Lash is currently working with Joe Ludwinski (Scurvine, The Grand Vizars), and Jason Milam (Scurvine, Lovecup) on a new project called Alpha Mile. Alpha Mile played their first show in December 2008 at the Highdive in Champaign. Alpha Mile has been recording off and on, and hope to have an album out in 2010. The 2009 Pygmalion Music Festival featured sets from both Gazelle and Alpha Mile. This was Gazelle's debut live show.

=== Reunions ===
In 2003, the band reunited for a one-off appearance at Furnace Fest near downtown Birmingham, Alabama at the historic Sloss Furnaces. Furnace Fest, held August 15–17, 2003, was a festival of hard rock, alternative, indie, and emo acts from across the country. As the story went, the band said that they would be willing to play any show for a high price (assuming that no one would actually be willing to pay that amount), and the organizers at Furnace Fest called their bluff. Hum headlined Saturday night, playing a set and an encore. The band was reportedly dissatisfied with the performance, and actually preferred the surprise warm-up show they played in Champaign directly prior.

Though declining to re-form on a permanent basis, Hum has continued to perform occasional club shows and regional festival appearances. "We want to play small clubs again and perform just for our fans," says Talbott. "I feel bad that younger kids often can't go to those shows, but it's important for us to have some fun and play for people who care about our music."

In May 2010, Miami-based record label Pop Up Records, announced a Hum tribute album in the works entitled Songs of Farewell and Departure: A Tribute to Hum, featuring Funeral for a Friend, The Esoteric, The Felix Culpa, Anakin, (Damn) This Desert Air, Constants, Junius, City of Ships, Stomacher and more.

In a 2011 interview with The A.V. Club, Matt Talbott affirmed that Hum was likely to continue on an informal, sporadic basis. The band reunited for a couple of shows that year, playing at the inaugural A.V. Fest in Chicago, Illinois, followed by Fun Fun Fun Fest in Austin, Texas.

In June 2015, it was announced that Hum would partake in two brief tours. In August 2015, Hum opened for Failure for five shows on the east coast of the United States. The band played an aftershow for Atlanta's Wrecking Ball Fest in August. Following that, they performed at Riot Fest in Chicago in September 2015, before embarking on a six-show co-headlining tour with Mineral on the West Coast. After the tour was announced, drummer Bryan St. Pere sat out the tour, with Jason Gerken of Shiner subbing.

=== Inlet, St. Pere's death and onward ===
On June 23, 2020, the band surprise-released their fifth studio album, entitled Inlet, their first in 22 years. The album peaked at No. 15 on the Billboard Heatseekers Albums chart and at No. 30 on the Billboard Current Album Sales chart.

Drummer Bryan St. Pere died on June 29, 2021, at age 53.

In September 2025, it was announced that Hum would return to perform at Slide Away Festival in May 2026, with Jason Gerken returning on drums. The festival featured the return of Hum and Chapterhouse, as well as the 10-year anniversary of Nothing and other artists in areas such as New York City, Chicago, and Los Angeles .

== Musical style and songwriting ==
Hum's albums Electra 2000 and You'd Prefer an Astronaut combine a distorted guitar tone and melodic songwriting, with contrasts between quiet, calm and loud, aggressive passages. You'd Prefer an Astronaut had comparably greater variation in dynamics than the band's directly preceding album, Electra 2000 (1993), with a more spacious sound and a more restrained approach, as well as some songs containing slower tempos and heavier distortion. In a 2012 interview conducted by Smile Politely, Matt Talbott explained that additional recording time and funding allowed the band to broaden its range with layered guitar parts and develop denser arrangements on You'd Prefer an Astronaut. He described how all four of the band's members were closely involved and strongly opinionated during the band's writing and recording of the album.

Hum's fourth studio album, Downward Is Heavenward (1998), further developed the band's sound through layered instrumentation and a wider range of arrangements. Jason Panella of The Curator identified progressive rock elements in "Isle of the Cheetah" and "Afternoon with the Axolotls," alongside the more direct indie-pop songwriting of "Ms. Lazarus."

On Inlet (2020), the band's fifth studio album, Ian Cohen of Pitchfork contrasted Talbott's heavy rhythm guitar with Tim Lash's textured lead playing, describing the album's approach as combining post-hardcore guitars with the slower tempos of stoner metal. Four of the eight tracks on the album exceed eight minutes, with these extended arrangements containing repetitive riffs. Tom Piekarski of Exclaim! described its heavy riffs, vocal melodies and sonic experimentation as elements retained from the band's earlier work.

Writing about You'd Prefer an Astronaut, John Steinbacher of Smile Politely interpreted Talbott's frequent lyrical use of imagery of space and distance as expressing themes of love, loss and emotional separation. When asked about the origins of these themes, Talbott connected his artistic outlook to his upbringing, spending much of his time outdoors in the countryside. In a 2008 interview with ALARM, he described the lyrics as impressionistic and explained that revisiting older songs revealed new meanings in the context of experiences he had undergone since writing them.

== Influences and legacy ==
Hum cited influences including Smashing Pumpkins, Poster Children, Dinosaur Jr., Pixies, Ride, My Bloody Valentine, Boo Radleys, the Jesus and Mary Chain, Spacemen 3, Galaxy 500 and Codeine.

Hum has been cited as an influence by multiple groups and artists, including the White Noise, Chino Moreno of Deftones, Narrow Head, Hundred Reasons, Citizen, Nothing, Cloakroom, Split Chain, Fleshwater, Modern Color, Superheaven and Stemage.

== Members ==
- Matt Talbott – lead vocals, rhythm guitar (1989–2000, 2003, 2011–present)
- Jeff Dimpsey – bass (1992–2000, 2003, 2011–present)
- Tim Lash – lead guitar (1993–2000, 2003, 2011–present)
- Jason Gerken – drums (2015, 2025–present)

Previous members

- Andy Switzky – lead guitar, lead vocals (1989–1993)
- Akis Boyatzis – bass (1989–1990)
- Jeff Kropp – drums (1989–1990)
- Joe Futrelle – bass (1990)
- Rod Van Huis – bass (1990–1991)
- Baltie de Lay – bass, backing vocals (1991–1992)
- Bryan St. Pere – drums (1990–2000, 2003, 2011–2015, 2015–2021; his death)

== Discography ==
=== Studio albums ===
Title	Album details	Peak chart positions	
Title	Album details	US	US Heat.
Fillet Show	Released: 1991; Label: 12 Inch Records; Formats: CD, cassette	—	—
Electra 2000	Released: October 19, 1993; Label: 12 Inch Records, Martians Go Home; Formats: CD, cassette, vinyl	—	—
You'd Prefer an Astronaut	Released: April 11, 1995; Label: RCA; Formats: CD, cassette, vinyl	105	1
Downward Is Heavenward	Released: January 27, 1998; Label: RCA; Formats: CD, cassette, vinyl	150	6
Inlet	Released: June 23, 2020; Label: Earth Analog Records, Polyvinyl Record Co.; Formats: CD, digital, vinyl	111	15

=== Demos ===
- Kissing Me Is Like Kissing an Angel
- It's Gonna Be a Midget X-mas

=== Singles ===
Year	Title	Peak chart positions		Album
Year	Title	US Alt	US Main	Album
1992	"Hello Kitty"	—	—	Non-album single
1992	"Sundress"	—	—	Electra 2000
1995	"Stars"	11	28	You'd Prefer an Astronaut
1995	"The Pod"	—	—	You'd Prefer an Astronaut
1995	"I'd Like Your Hair Long"	—	—	You'd Prefer an Astronaut
1998	"Puppets" / "Aphids"	—	—	Non-album single
1998	"Comin' Home"	37	—	Downward Is Heavenward
1998	"Green to Me"	—	—	Downward Is Heavenward
"—" denotes singles that did not chart.

=== Music videos ===
Title	Year	Album
"Iron Clad Lou"	1992	Electra 2000
"Stars"	1995	You'd Prefer an Astronaut
"The Pod"	1995	You'd Prefer an Astronaut
"Comin' Home"	1997	Downward Is Heavenward
"Green to Me"	1997	Downward Is Heavenward
