= Gilded Stars and Zealous Hearts =

Studio album by Velocity Girl
- Released: March 12, 1996
- Genre: Indie rock, indie pop
- Label: Sub Pop
- Producer: Clif Norrell

Velocity Girl chronology
Simpatico (1994)	Gilded Stars and Zealous Hearts (1996)

Professional ratings
Review scores
Source	Rating
AllMusic	2/5 stars
The Encyclopedia of Popular Music	3/5 stars
MusicHound Rock: The Essential Album Guide	3/5 stars

Gilded Stars and Zealous Hearts is the third, and final, studio album by indie rock band Velocity Girl. It was released in 1996 on Sub Pop.

"Nothing" was the band's last music video, and was released on a single with the non-album track "Anatomy Of A Gutless Wonder". Two other songs, "Same Old City" and "Finest Hour", appeared on the compilations Golden Jam: General Mills' Golden Grahams and That Virtua Feeling: Sub Pop And Sega Get Together, respectively.

== Critical reception ==
Trouser Press called Gilded Stars and Zealous Hearts "an uninspired album of relatively straight-ahead mainstreamed pop." Entertainment Weekly wrote that the band "offer a few spritely, memorable melodies featuring happy, strumming guitars behind boy-girl harmonies." MTV deemed the album full of "radiocatchy punk-pop songs with easy melodies and hooks galore, coupled with intelligent, decipherable lyrics that, if not always profound, manage to steer clear of pop cliché." CMJ New Music Monthly wrote that Velocity Girl "makes a convincing case for writing coherent, intelligent pop songs that continue to sound as if they were recorded in someone's basement (albeit with excellent equipment)."

== Track listing ==
1. "Gilded Stars" (3:22)
2. "Nothing" (2:46)
3. "Just Like That" (2:34)
4. "Same Old City" (3:49)
5. "Go Coastal" (3:18)
6. "Lose Something" (2:23)
7. "It's Not For You" (3:00)
8. "Zealous Heart" (3:14)
9. "The Only Ones" (3:04)
10. "Finest Hour" (2:56)
11. "Blue In Spite" (2:37)
12. "Formula 1 Throwaway" (3:31)
13. "For The Record" (2:40)
14. "One Word" (3:36)
