= Simpatico (Velocity Girl album) =

Studio album by Velocity Girl
- Released: June 14, 1994
- Recorded: Dec. 1993 – Jan. 1994
- Genres: Indie rock, indie pop
- Length: 34:39
- Label: Sub Pop
- Producer: John Porter

Velocity Girl chronology
Copacetic (1993)	Simpatico (1994)	Gilded Stars and Zealous Hearts (1996)

¡Simpatico! is the second album by Velocity Girl. It was released in June 1994.

Compared to the band's debut album Copacetic, ¡Simpatico! showed more traditional indie pop/ power pop influences, rather than noisy shoegaze tendencies. "Sorry Again" was released as a single (via a CD EP with three non-album tracks, and a 7" with one non-album track). "What You Left Behind" features rare male lead vocals.

== Production ==
The album was recorded at Cue Studios in Falls Church, Virginia, from December 27, 1993, to Jan 15, 1994. It was produced by John Porter.

== Critical reception ==
Professional ratings
Review scores
Source	Rating
AllMusic	4.5/5 stars
The Encyclopedia of Popular Music	3/5 stars
Entertainment Weekly	C
MusicHound Rock: The Essential Album Guide	3.5/5 stars
Rolling Stone	4/5 stars

Rolling Stone wrote that "the group manages to mop up the garage-band spills to reveal simple melodic constructions without washing away the music's defining layers." Trouser Press wrote that ¡Simpatico! "has some great tunes but less of the atmosphere that makes the first album so riveting." The Washington Post wrote: "Cleaner sounding and better focused, Simpatico! leaves behind the cacophonous lullabies of the band's early sound, largely derived from the dream-pop of such British bands as My Bloody Valentine." Pitchfork called the album "classically styled near-British pop." Entertainment Weekly deemed it "pleasant to the point of blandness," writing that "!Simpatico! is like a grungy Cranberries — without the hits."

== Track listing ==
1. "Sorry Again"
2. "There's Only One Thing Left to Say"
3. "Tripping Wires"
4. "I Can't Stop Smiling"
5. "The All-Consumer"
6. "Drug Girls"
7. "Rubble"
8. "Labrador"
9. "Hey You, Get Off My Moon"
10. "Medio Core"
11. "What You Left Behind"
12. "Wake Up, I'm Leaving"
