= Black Cat (Washington, D.C., nightclub) =

Nightclub in Washington, D.C.

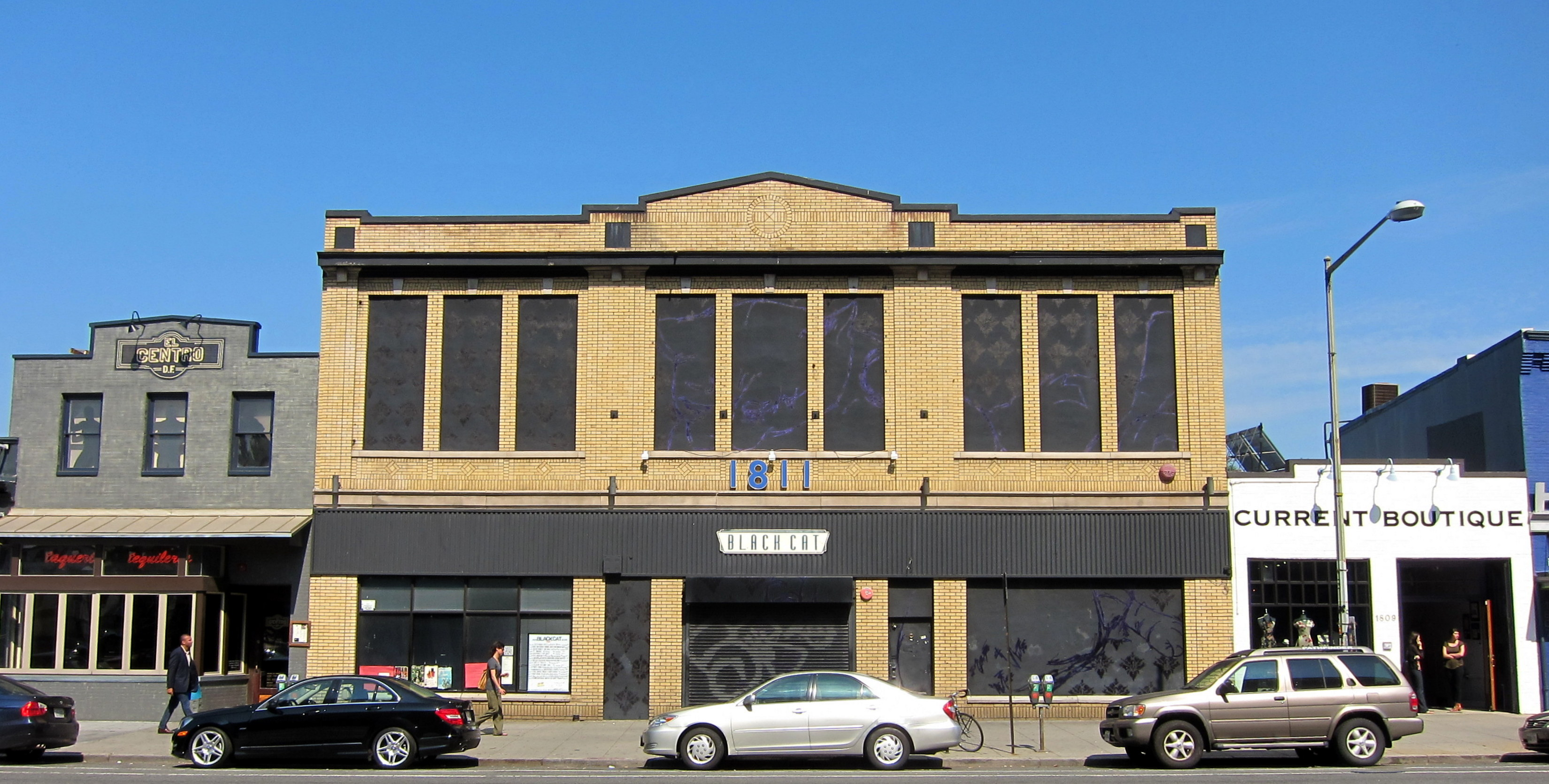
- Front of the Black Cat
- Interactive map of Black Cat
- Location: Washington, D.C., US
- Coordinates: 38.914563°N 77.031597°W
- Seating type: Standing room, bar seating
- Type: Music venue
- Event: alternative / punk / metal / dance
- Public transit: Washington Metro at U Street

Construction
- Opened: September 11, 1993
- Renovated: September 13, 2001
- Expanded: September 2018

Website
- blackcatdc.com

The Black Cat is a nightclub in Washington, D.C., located on 14th Street Northwest in the Shaw/U Street neighborhood. The club was founded at 1831 14th Street NW in 1993 by former Gray Matter drummer Dante Ferrando, along with a group of investors (including D.C. area native, Nirvana drummer, and future Foo Fighters leader Dave Grohl) and quickly established itself as a venue for independent music. While the Black Cat is most known for its support of indie rock, featured musical acts include metal, punk, and electronic, as well as DJ/dance nights, stand-up comedy, and film screenings. The Black Cat's "Mainstage" concert venue is on the second floor in a 7000 square-foot space with a capacity of 800.

The first concert held at the Black Cat was by the Washington, D.C. band 9353 on September 11, 1993. Ferrando named the club after an establishment his great-grandfather operated in Greenwich Village in the 1920s. The club's original location had a capacity of 400 patrons and was envisioned by Ferrando as a supplement to the 9:30 Club and a way to fill the void left by the recently-shuttered independent music venue, d.c. space. “We’re not trying to compete with anyone,” stated musician and then-Black Cat concert booker Chris Thomson, at the time of the club's opening. “I think it just gives people other options.”

In 2001, the venue moved three doors south, to 1811 14th Street NW. The location formerly held a dance club called the Cage and, before that, Mattos Paints. The second location for the Black Cat opened on September 13, 2001 and featured a concert by the Omaha, Nebraska synth-punk band, the Faint.

Until 2019, Black Cat hosted lesser-known acts on the "Backstage," a 200-patron capacity event area on the first floor. The first floor of the club also contained a no-cover bar/lounge called the "Red Room", and the "Food For Thought" café. Serving primarily vegetarian food, along with some meat and vegan dishes, "Food For Thought" was named for a Dupont Circle vegetarian restaurant – owned by Ferrando's father, Bobby Ferrando – that operated from 1973 to 1999.

The Black Cat announced in September 2018 that, by the end of the year, the venue would contract and that the "Backstage" and "Red Room" areas on the first floor would move into a smaller space upstairs on the second floor, adjoining the "Mainstage" show space. Ferrando attributed the changes to declining interest from patrons of the venue, noting that they are making room for one or two retail tenants that fit in better with the new landscape of the neighborhood.

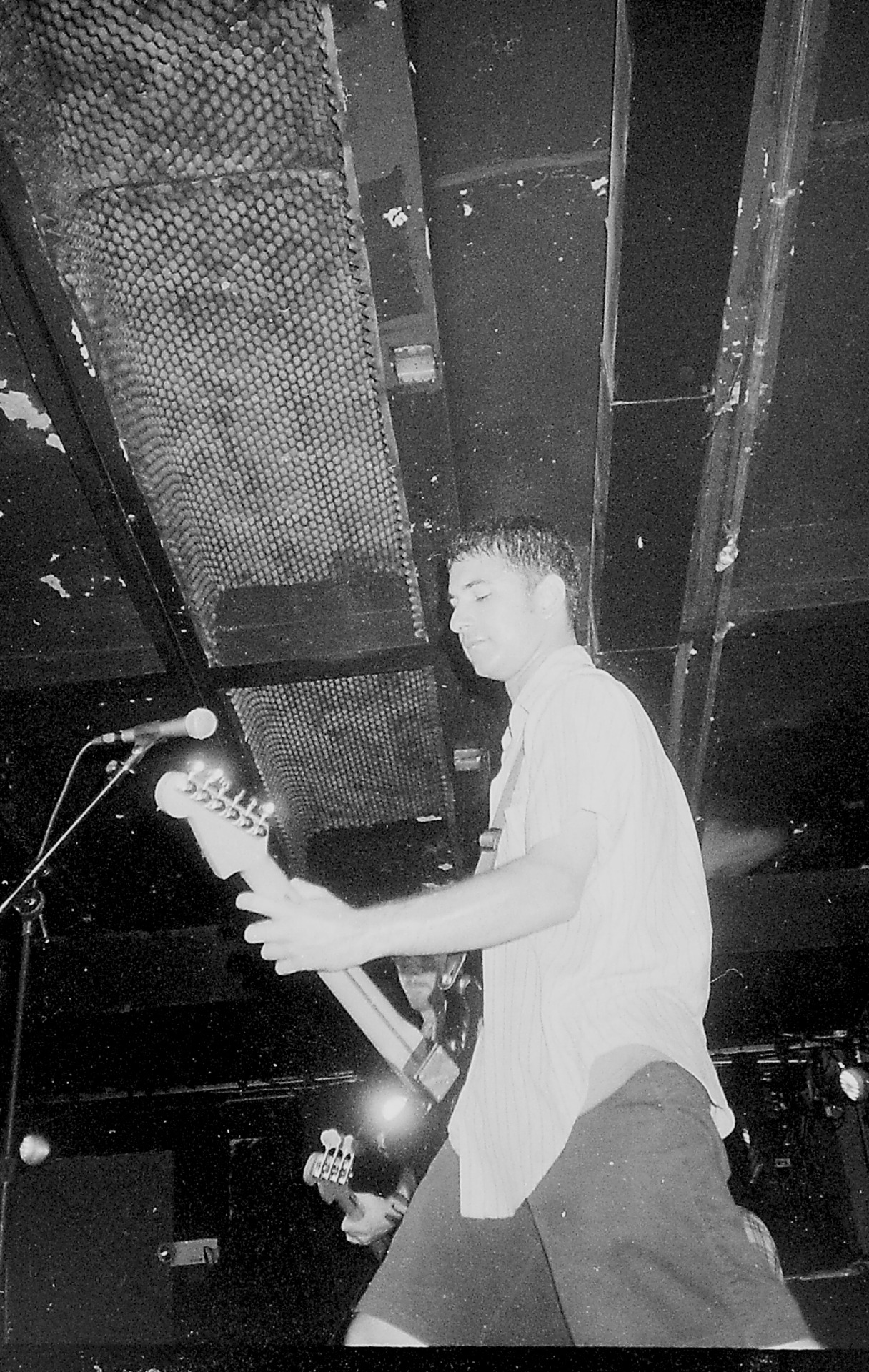
Edsel performs at the Black Cat in July 1995

The Black Cat is served by the U Street station on the Washington Metro, about three blocks from the club.

The venue has hosted many successful musical artists, the likes of which include Jeff Buckley, Foo Fighters, Radiohead, Bikini Kill, Fugazi, Death Cab for Cutie, The Cramps, The Killers, The Strokes, Elliott Smith, Molchat Doma, Bon Iver, Bad Religion, Fleet Foxes, and the Yeah Yeah Yeahs.
