= Greed Magazine =

- Editor: Kurt Sayenga
- Categories: music, comics, and culture
- Frequency: 2x/year (varied)
- Publisher: Bleak House
- First issue: Late Winter 1986
- Final issue Number: 1989; 6
- Country: United States of America
- Based in: Washington, D.C.
- Language: English

Greed Magazine was a music, comics, and culture periodical published in Washington, D.C., by Kurt Sayenga from 1986 to 1989. It lasted six issues, and included interviews with Robyn Hitchcock, Los Bros Hernandez (creators of Love and Rockets), Sonic Youth, Bob Burden (creator of Flaming Carrot and Mystery Men), Rites of Spring, and Chester Brown (creator of Yummy Fur). The magazine also published the first appearance of Evan Dorkin's popular creations Milk and Cheese, which spawned a comic as well as T-shirts, lunch boxes, and refrigerator magnets.

== Publication history ==
The first three issues (Late Winter, 1986; Spring, 1987; Fall, 1987) were entirely black and white, with covers by Peter Hayes, while the last three featured color covers, done respectively by Charles Burns, Los Bros Hernandez, and Bob Burden.
