= Glifted =

- Origin: Champaign, Illinois, USA
- Genres: Electronic, alternative rock, shoegazing, noise
- Years active: 2001–2008

Glifted was an American shoegaze band formed in 2001 by Tim Lash, former guitarist for Hum, and T. J. Harrison of the band Lovecup.

They released only one album, Under and In, on Hum's Martians Go Home label in 2002. The album was made up of experimental soundscapes, noise, loops, and beats to create an ethereal and sometimes chaotic sound that many critics compared to My Bloody Valentine, receiving generally positive reviews.

The duo recorded some material for an EP in 2005 but it was never officially released; however one track called "Blowing All Your Cool" was uploaded to their MySpace account, simply under the album title "various shenanigans".

Although a second album was also reported to be in production, Lash confirmed in 2008 that Glifted has disbanded.

== Discography ==
=== Studio albums ===
Title	Album details	
Under and In	Released: October 22, 2002; Label: Martians Go Home	—
