= 13 Songs (Fugazi album) =

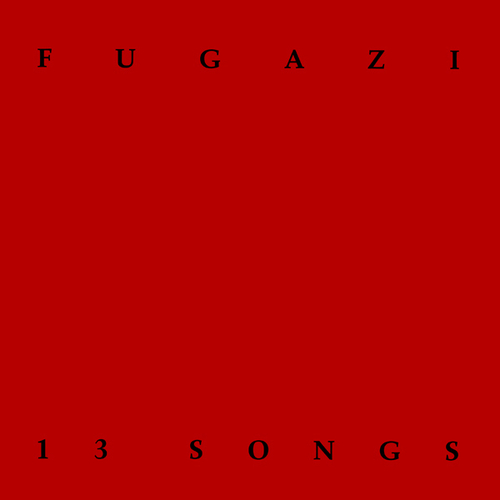

Compilation album by Fugazi
- Released: September 1, 1989
- Recorded: June; December 1988
- Studio: Inner Ear Studios (Arlington, Virginia) Southern Studios (London, England)
- Genres: Post-hardcore; art punk
- Length: 40:10
- Label: Dischord
- Producers: Ted Niceley, John Loder

Fugazi chronology
Margin Walker (1989)	13 Songs (1989)	3 Songs (1989)

13 Songs is a compilation album by the American post-hardcore band Fugazi, released on September 1, 1989, by Dischord Records. The album consists of all the songs from the band's first two EPs, Fugazi and Margin Walker. In regards to worldwide sales, it is the band's most commercially successful album, with a reported figure between 750,000 and 3 million sales.

== Background ==
The EPs compiled were Fugazi (1988), which was recorded at Inner Ear Studios in June 1988 with Ted Niceley & Don Zientara, and Margin Walker (1989), which was recorded in December 1988 at Southern Studios in London with John Loder handling production duties.

The EPs had been on Ian MacKaye's Dischord Records as numbers 30 and 35, respectively. 13 Songs was number 36. A remastered version was released in February 2003.

== Release ==
13 Songs is Fugazi's most successful release. While certain sources report the album's total worldwide sales as being over 3 million, Alan O'Connor in his 2008 book Punk Record Labels and the Struggle for Autonomy: The Emergence of DIY lists the figure as 750,000 (based on an interview with Dischord Records).

== Reception ==
Professional ratings
Review scores
Source	Rating
AllMusic	5/5 stars
Encyclopedia of Popular Music	4/5 stars
The Great Rock Discography	8/10
MusicHound Rock	4.5/5 stars
OndaRock	7.5/10
Robert Christgau	(choice cut)
The Rolling Stone Album Guide	4/5 stars
Spin Alternative Record Guide	8/10
Uncut	9/10

The album has gone on to receive critical acclaim, despite being a compilation, with many calling it one of the best albums of the post-hardcore genre. Stereogum called it "as auspicious as punk debuts come", further noting that on the album, "most of the Fugazi elements were in place from the jump, albeit in a somewhat less-developed form. If the concept of a punk band writing a song from the perspective of a woman being hooted at by sexist loudmouths seems revolutionary now, imagine what it sounded like in 1988, when the canon of classic punk still consisted largely of songs dealing with beating on brats, lynching landlords, and the ritual impaling of cats." In a 5-star review for Allmusic, Andy Kellman called the album "timeless" and wrote that "the importance of this record can perhaps be more suitably measured by the number of people who remember the first time they heard it. 13 Songs is usually among the first records that spring to mind when defining alternative rock. Furious, intelligent, artful, and entirely musical, it's a baker's dozen of cannon shots to the gut -- not just a batch of emotionally visceral and defiant songs recorded by angry young men, but something greater." Consequence of Sound called it "a solid classic, instantly grabbing the ear with a timeless quality that you just don’t find every day. [...] I know this music is over 20 years old, but it sounds like it’s pouring out of someone’s garage down the street. You can’t fake this kind of timeless authenticity, though God knows many have tried." According to Popmatters, the album (along with Repeater) "remain the band's most widely successful and consistently praised work. 13 Songs, for instance, has sold over three million copies -- all without radio singles, music videos, or any of the tools of corporate publicity that help musicians reach that stratospheric level of success."

=== Accolades ===
In 2005, 13 Songs was ranked 29 in Spin's "100 Greatest Albums, 1985–2005". NME ranked it #284 in their list of "The 500 Greatest Albums of All Time" in 2014. Paste ranked it at #57 on their list of "The 80 Best Albums of the 1980s". In 2016, Rolling Stone ranked it 35th on their list of the "40 Greatest Punk Albums of All Time".

== Influence ==
According to Kathleen Hanna of Bikini Kill: "13 Songs is to underground music what Led Zeppelin IV is to suburban potheads." According to Conrad Keely of ...And You Will Know Us by the Trail of Dead, the album along with Unwound's Fake Train "epitomized America's disaffected, self-hating white middle-class guilt victims screaming about the fact that they have nothing to do with their time other than be bored, nothing to speak out against other than their own ennui and unwarranted discontent. And although that might sound like a criticism or an indictment, the fact is that this sentiment existed, it was shared by a lot of us, and it found its voice in albums like [13 Songs]." "Looking back upon the arc of alternative rock, punk and indie throughout the decade," writes Treble, "from Nirvana to Jawbox, Shudder to Think, Sunny Day Real Estate, Quicksand and The Afghan Whigs, there’s a line that traces back to the jittery funk and searingly melodic hardcore of Fugazi’s first two EPs, which comprise 13 Songs." Both Jack Johnson and Eddie Vedder have named 13 Songs as one of their favorite albums of all time. Rise Against cited the album as one of their 12 key influences, alongside works by Bad Religion, Dead Kennedys and Jawbreaker.

== Track listing ==
All tracks are written by Fugazi.

No.	Title	Lead vocals	Length
1.	"Waiting Room"	MacKaye	2:53
2.	"Bulldog Front"	Picciotto	2:53
3.	"Bad Mouth"	MacKaye	2:35
4.	"Burning"	Picciotto	2:39
5.	"Give Me the Cure"	Picciotto	2:58
6.	"Suggestion"	MacKaye	4:44
7.	"Glue Man"	Picciotto	4:23
8.	"Margin Walker"	Picciotto	2:30
9.	"And the Same"	MacKaye	3:27
10.	"Burning Too"	MacKaye	2:50
11.	"Provisional"	Picciotto	2:17
12.	"Lockdown"	Picciotto	2:10
13.	"Promises"	MacKaye	4:02
Total length:			40:10

- Tracks 1–7 taken from Fugazi
- Tracks 8–13 taken from Margin Walker

== Personnel ==
Fugazi

- Ian MacKaye – lead and backing vocals, guitar
- Guy Picciotto – lead and backing vocals
- Brendan Canty – drums
- Joe Lally – bass

Additional personnel

- Edward Janney – Popsloppy guitar on "Provisional"
- Ted Niceley – producer on tracks 1–7
- Fugazi – producer on tracks 1–7
- Don Zientara – engineer on tracks 1–7
- John Loder – producer, engineer on tracks 8–13
- Paul Gadd – engineer on tracks 8–13
- Glen E. Friedman – Inner front cover photo
- Adam Cohen – Traycard photo
- Bert Queiroz – Back photo
- Kurt Sayenga – graphics
