= Jim Spellman =

American journalist and musician (born 1968)

Jim Spellman (born 1968) is an American journalist and musician. Formerly with CNN, Spellman joined CGTN America in 2013. Before that, he also played guitar in the High Back Chairs and Julie Ocean and drums in Velocity Girl, which contributed to the soundtrack for the 1995 movie Clueless. Most recently, he has played guitar with Foxhall Stacks.
