= You'd Prefer an Astronaut =

Studio album by Hum
- Released: April 11, 1995
- Recorded: 1994–1995
- Studios: Playground, Chicago; Pachyderm (Cannon Falls, Minnesota) (Track 5)
- Genres: Post-hardcore; space rock; alternative rock; alternative metal
- Length: 45:53
- Language: English
- Label: RCA
- Producers: Keith Cleversley; Hum

Hum chronology
Electra 2000 (1993)	You'd Prefer an Astronaut (1995)	Downward Is Heavenward (1998)

Singles from You'd Prefer an Astronaut
- 1. "Stars" Released: May 22, 1995; 2. "The Pod" Released: May 27, 1996; 3. "I'd Like Your Hair Long" Released: 1996

Professional ratings
Review scores
Source	Rating
AllMusic	4/5 stars
Chicago Tribune	3/4 stars
Kerrang!	3/5 stars
MusicHound Rock	3.5/5 stars

You'd Prefer an Astronaut is the third studio album by the American alternative rock band Hum, released on April 11, 1995, by RCA Records as their major label debut. The title of the album is a lyric lifted from the song "I'd Like Your Hair Long".

The album has sold over 250,000 copies since its release, mostly due to the second single from the album, "Stars". It became Hum's highest charting song, reaching 11 on Hot Modern Rock Tracks and 28 on Hot Mainstream Rock Tracks; it regained popularity a decade later after being featured in a Cadillac commercial with actress Kate Walsh. The song and its video were also featured on the television show Beavis and Butt-Head.

The album spawned two other singles, "The Pod" and "I'd Like Your Hair Long", although neither received the commercial success of "Stars".

== Legacy ==
Discussing You'd Prefer an Astronaut, Deftones frontman Chino Moreno said, "This is a heavy record, and it's where Deftones get a big part of our influence from, tone-wise."

In 2016, Sam Blum of The A.V. Club listed the album as an overlooked masterpiece.

== Track listing ==
1. "Little Dipper" – 4:44
2. "The Pod" – 4:38
3. "Stars" – 5:09
4. "Suicide Machine" – 5:58
5. "The Very Old Man" – 2:45
6. "Why I Like the Robins" – 4:58
7. "I'd Like Your Hair Long" – 5:26
8. "I Hate It Too" – 5:59
9. "Songs of Farewell and Departure" – 6:16

== Personnel ==
Hum

- Jeff Dimpsey – bass guitar
- Tim Lash – guitar
- Bryan St. Pere – drums
- Matt Talbott – guitar and vocals

Technical

- Keith Cleversley – production
