= Velocity Girl (album) =

Velocity Girl EP

EP by Velocity Girl
- Released: April 1993
- Recorded: 1990 - 1992
- Genre: Indie rock
- Label: Slumberland Records
- Producer: Velocity Girl

Velocity Girl chronology
Velocity Girl EP (1993)	Copacetic (1993)

Velocity Girl EP is a compilation of singles by Velocity Girl, released in April 1993. Lead vocals were performed by the following: Bridget Cross on "Not at All" and both versions of "I Don't Care if You Go"; Sarah Shannon on "Forgotten Favorite" and "Why Should I Be Nice to You?"; and Archie Moore on "Always". The song "Forgotten Favorite" appeared on the soundtrack of the 1995 Alicia Silverstone movie Clueless, as well as the 2000 indie film Calling Bobcat under the title "My Forgotten Favorite".

== Track listing ==
1. "I Don't Care If You Go"
2. "Always"
3. "Forgotten Favorite"
4. "Why Should I Be Nice to You?"
5. "Not at All"
6. "I Don't Care If You Go" (acoustic)
