= Fugazi (EP) =

EP by Fugazi
- Released: November 1988
- Recorded: June 1988 at Inner Ear Studios
- Studio: Inner Ear Studios
- Genres: Post-hardcore; post-punk; emo
- Length: 23:06
- Language: English
- Label: Dischord 030
- Producers: Ted Niceley, Fugazi

Fugazi chronology
Fugazi (1988)	Margin Walker (1989)

Fugazi, also known as the EP 7 Songs, is the debut release by the American post-hardcore band Fugazi. As with subsequent release Margin Walker, Guy Picciotto did not contribute guitar to this record; all guitar was performed by Ian MacKaye. It was originally recorded in June 1988 and released in November 1988 on vinyl and again in 1989 on the compilation release 13 Songs along with the following EP Margin Walker. The photo used for the album cover was taken on June 30, 1988 at Maxwell's in Hoboken, New Jersey.

== Content ==
The release features "Waiting Room" which is often seen as the band's most well-known song, notorious for "the attention-getting drop into silence that occurs at the 22-second mark," as well as for its "relentless ska/reggae-inflected drive", and "Suggestion", a "Meters-meets-Ruts thrust."

== Reception ==
Professional ratings
Review scores
Source	Rating
AllMusic	4.5/5 stars
MusicHound Rock	5/5 stars
OndaRock	7.5/10
Punknews.org	4.5/5 stars
Spin Alternative Record Guide	9/10
The Virgin Encyclopedia of Heavy Rock	3/5 stars

The band's entry in the Trouser Press record guide, written by Ian McCaleb, Ira Robbins and Mike Fournier, calls the EP an "impressive debut" which "blends a classic DC-core sensibility with a mature, objective outlook and crisply produced mid-tempo songs that are dynamic, aggressive and accessible." They write that MacKaye and Picciotto "trade raw emotionalism for an introspective, almost poetic vision, using abstractions in strongly structured compositions like “Bulldog Front” and “Give Me the Cure,” a contemplation on death." Andy Kellman of AllMusic calls the EP "excellent".

CMJ New Music Report reviewed the EP positively, remarking that, despite the band's impressive pedigree, Fugazi "doesn't trample or get mired in their past, and is one of the best recent releases of the sort. [...] What's most important here is the way the lyrics and music match up, pointing to a necessary maturation in the rarest and most positive sense. The lyrics manage to get sincere viewpoints across without being hokey or preachy, while the music is pared down, and yet more ominous and troubling for it (see "Suggestion")."

Byron Coley, writing in Forced Exposure, gave Fugazi a positive review, calling it "easily the best Dischord release since Out of Step. [...] Stylistically, this is a hodgepodge, but it's largely a great hodgepodge -- momentary flashes of Lee Perry, the Misfits, Cream, and the Germs all passed afore my ears while it played."

Mark Jenkins of The Washington Post listed Fugazi as one of his top releases of 1988, describing the group as "D.C.'s most galvanizing band, edgy and explosive punk-funk whose purpose is just as white-hot as its sound." In a different review also published in The Washington Post, Jenkins wrote that:

[Fugazi] is one of the strongest post-post-punk ensembles in the known world, not just the neighborhood. The combination of Brendan Canty and Joe Lally's taut rhythm section and Ian MacKaye and Guy Picciotto's impassioned vocal interplay is as uncompromising as the subjects the latter duo attack: rape, AIDS, drugs, self-delusion. Angry but clear-eyed, songs like "Suggestion" and "Bad Mouth" are among the most incendiary devices detonated since early-'80s bands like Gang of Four and the Au Pairs surrendered. The only possible complaint about thls debut EP is that seven songs are not enough to explore the possibilities of this astonishing band.

== Legacy ==
=== Accolades ===
In 2018, Pitchfork ranked the EP at #45 on their list of "The 200 Best Albums of the 1980s", with Evan Rytlewski writing that while the band "would go on to release hours of the most inventive post-hardcore ever, [...] they never recorded anything else so instantly gratifying."

=== Influence ===
According to Kim Thayil of Soundgarden, the band would regularly listen to cassettes of the Fugazi EP and Nirvana's Bleach whilst on tour. Walter Shcreifels of Quicksand, in a feature for Revolver, ranked it the best post-hardcore album of all time and called it "ground zero for whatever's great about the genre." The Get Up Kids singer and guitarist Jim Suptic has described the first time he listened to the EP as a "a clouds-parting moment" and has stated that the album is responsible for his interest in hardcore and punk rock.

"Waiting Room" has been covered by a wide range of musicians since the EP's release. Tropical Fuck Storm covered "Burning" live. Prong covered "Give Me the Cure". Pearl Jam covered "Suggestion" in various concerts in the early 1990s, usually as a tag to another song or an improvised jam. The track was also covered by Jonah Matranga and Taina Asili (in collaboration with the Nuyorican hip-hop/punk band Ricanstruction).

== Track listing ==
All tracks are written by Fugazi.

No.	Title	Lead Vocals	Length
1.	"Waiting Room"	MacKaye	2:53
2.	"Bulldog Front"	Picciotto	2:53
3.	"Bad Mouth"	MacKaye	2:36
4.	"Burning"	Picciotto	2:40
5.	"Give Me the Cure"	Picciotto	2:58
6.	"Suggestion"	MacKaye	4:44
7.	"Glue Man"	Picciotto	4:24
Total length:			23:06

== Personnel ==
- Ian MacKaye – vocals, guitar
- Guy Picciotto – vocals
- Joe Lally – bass
- Brendan Canty – drums
