= Copacetic (Velocity Girl album) =

Studio album by Velocity Girl
- Released: 1993
- Recorded: Memphis, 1993
- Genre: Indie rock, shoegaze
- Label: Sub Pop
- Producer: Bob Weston

Velocity Girl chronology
Velocity Girl (1993)	Copacetic (1993)	Simpatico (1994)

Copacetic is an album by Velocity Girl, released in 1993. It is their first full-length album and features the singles "Crazy Town" and "Audrey's Eyes," both of which were given music videos. The album's title is an American slang word for being untroubled.

== Production ==
The album was produced by Bob Weston and was recorded over five days for less than $5,000. Its sound is heavily influenced by shoegaze. Kelly Riles described the recording of the album: "We mixed the album in a very different way than people would have expected us to—it's very rough sounding. It's a deliberate move away from the lighter production on the singles".

== Critical reception ==
Professional ratings
Review scores
Source	Rating
AllMusic	4.5/5 stars
Chicago Tribune	1.5/4 stars
Robert Christgau	(neither)
Entertainment Weekly	C+
Rolling Stone	4/5 stars
Spin	(mixed)
The Virgin Encyclopedia of Nineties Music	3/5 stars

A review in Lime Lizard at the time of its release drew comparisons with My Bloody Valentine, stating that "this could be the rejected demos for Isn't Anything". The Washington Post noted that "the noisy dream-pop works some of the time (the opening 'Pretty Sister', for example), although when it gets too dreamy (the over-long 'Here Comes', the instrumental 'Candy Apples') it can just seem vague." Trouser Press wrote: "Despite being taken as shoegazers, Velocity Girl makes its songs here jump up and down rather than simply stare at the floor."

The album was listed among "75 Lost Classics" in the Spring 2007 issue of Magnet.

== Track listing ==
1. "Pretty Sister" (4:59)
2. "Crazy Town" (3:47)
3. "Copacetic" (3:41)
4. "Here Comes" (4:42)
5. "Pop Loser" (2:24)
6. "Living Well" (3:06)
7. "A Chang" (5:48)
8. "Audrey's Eyes" (3:02)
9. "Lisa Librarian" (2:18)
10. "57 Waltz" (2:49)
11. "Candy Apples" (3:07)
12. "Catching Squirrels" (5:42)
