= Stars (Hum song) =

1995 Hum single

Single by Hum

from the album You'd Prefer an Astronaut
- Released: 1995
- Recorded: 1994
- Genre: Alternative rock; post-hardcore; grunge
- Length: 5:09; 4:32 (radio edit)
- Label: RCA
- Songwriters: Matt Talbott; Jeff Dimpsey; Tim Lash; Bryan St. Pere
- Producers: Keith Cleversley; Matt Talbott; Jeff Dimpsey; Tim Lash; Bryan St. Pere

Hum singles chronology
"I'd Like Your Hair Long" (1995)	"Stars" (1995)	"The Pod" (1995)

"Stars" is the second single from Hum's 1995 album You'd Prefer an Astronaut. The single was moderately successful in the United States, peaking at number eleven on the Hot Modern Rock Tracks, and at number twenty-eight on the Hot Mainstream Rock Tracks.

== Composition ==
"Stars"—which was written by Hum band members Matt Talbott, Jeff Dimpsey, Tim Lash, and Bryan St. Pere—had been penned by the band years prior to their signing with RCA Records. The single was produced by the band and Keith Cleversley.

In terms of style, "Stars" is predicated on "quiet-loud dynamics" akin to those used by Pixies. According to the St. Louis Post-Dispatch, "Stars" (along with the other Hum tracks "The Pod" and "I'd Like Your Hair Long") features a "fuzzed-out barrage of guitars [that] suggest[s] a mixture of the pummeling sound of Dinosaur Jr. and the more dreamy soundscapes of Irish or British bands like My Bloody Valentine or Lush." Vox magazine wrote, "Tracks like 'Stars' ... are achingly melancholic, but Talbott's detached tone and the crashing outbreak of guitars prevents the [song] from sliding into sentimentalism."

== Reception ==
Prior to its being released as an official single, "Stars" received heavy airplay on the Los Angeles radio station KROQ-FM. According to the St. Louis Post-Dispatch, "KROQ jumped on the song so soon that RCA had to rush release the song nationwide, a full month before the scheduled release of [the] single." Hum's drummer Bryan St. Pere credited KROQ with making the song so popular, saying in an interview, "Yeah, I think [KROQ] helped us out the most, because from what I gather, that's the station in the country, and when they decide to add a song, all the other stations kind of follow suit." "Stars" eventually debuted on the Billboard Alternative Songs chart (then known as the "Modern Rock Tracks") at number 32 during the week of June 3, 1995, eventually peaking at number 11. According to the Los Angeles Times, "Stars" was vital in helping You'd Prefer an Astronaut sell over 250,000 copies.

In 2008, it was announced that the song had sold 26,000 digital copies, 29% of which had occurred since September 2007. Billboard magazine later hypothesized that this uptick in sales was due to a Cadillac commercial that used the song. According to Matt Talbott, the frontman of Hum:

People have always said this or that about using our songs in movies or commercials and nothing ever really comes of it. [...] [But one day] some guy at an ad firm asking about using a song for a commercial [...] I said, 'Yeah, sure, whatever man.' [He eventually] wrote back and told me more, and when I knew it was for real and that it sounded like a large campaign, I called my lawyer.

The commercial was released before the members of Hum were aware that a deal had been agreed upon. According to Talbott, he only learned of its existence when he was at a hotel and the commercial was playing. Suddenly, Talbott received a call from his wife, who informed him that others had seen the ad and were phoning their house.

The song can be heard on the radio station Krunch 106.66 in the video game Saints Row 2.

== Music video ==
A music video was released in 1995 that featured the band performing the song in a darkened basement-like room, interspersed with footage of a man covered in tattoos interacting with candles, a mask, a wall clock and other ephemera.

In the Beavis and Butt-head episode, "The Future of Beavis and Butt-head", the duo watch the video and change the channel after the extended chord early on, mistakenly thinking the song is over.

== Track listing ==
The following songs are on the CD single:

1. "Stars" – 5:09
2. "Boy with Stick" – 5:42
3. "Baby, Baby" – 2:30
4. "Stars" (Edit) – 4:32

== Personnel ==
- Matt Talbott - vocals, rhythm guitar
- Jeff Dimpsey - bass guitar
- Tim Lash - lead guitar
- Bryan St. Pere - drums

== Charts ==
Chart (1995)	Peak position
Canada Rock/Alternative (RPM)	7
US Radio Songs (Billboard)	72
US Alternative Songs (Billboard)	11
US Mainstream Rock (Billboard)	28

== Cover versions ==
- British industrial dance group Empirion remixed the song in 1996.
- Evergreen Terrace covered the song on their 2004 album Writer's Block.
- American metalcore band Bleeding Through covered the song for the 2006 compilation album Punk Goes 90's.
