= Margin Walker =

EP by Fugazi
- Released: June 1989
- Recorded: December 1988
- Studio: Southern Studios (London)
- Genre: Post-hardcore
- Length: 17:08
- Language: English
- Label: Dischord 035
- Producer: John Loder

Fugazi chronology
Fugazi (1988)	Margin Walker (1989)	13 Songs (1989)

Professional ratings
Review scores
Source	Rating
Allmusic	4.5/5 stars
MusicHound Rock	4/5 stars
OndaRock	7.5/10
Punknews.org	4.5/5 stars
Spin Alternative Record Guide	7/10
The Virgin Encyclopedia of Heavy Rock	3/5 stars

Margin Walker is the second EP by the American post-hardcore band Fugazi. It was originally released in June 1989 on vinyl and again in the same year on the compilation release 13 Songs along with the debut EP Fugazi. The 12" vinyl went out of print, but was remastered and reissued by Dischord Records in October 2009.

== Background ==
Margin Walker was recorded at Southern Studios in London, where Fugazi had finished their first European tour. It was produced by John Loder who was the engineer for several underground artists, including anarcho-punk band Crass which greatly influenced Fugazi. Originally intended to be their first studio album, Margin Walker was released as an EP due to what the members perceived as sub-par performances caused by the exhausting tour.

== Reception ==
According to Trouser Press, the EP "illustrates just how far Fugazi’s four have traveled from their hardcore beginnings. [...] in MacKaye’s melodic guitar work, the tight, fluid rhythm section, the incisive lyrics and the sharply arranged vocal exchanges." "Continuing to develop the stylings he began with Minor Threat," it continues, "MacKaye manages to make the expletives in the vigorously monotonal, part spoken “Promises” sound somewhat eloquent."

Andy Kellman of AllMusic called it an "equally excellent follow-up to the Fugazi EP." Margin Walker was also voted the 2nd best EP of the year in the 1989 Pazz & Jop poll, behind Lucinda Williams' Passionate Kisses. Melody Maker reviewed Margin Walker positively, with its critic noting that the EP sounded better with successive listens. "Four plays and songs suddenly open up," they wrote. "[The record] hasn't seen the inside of its sleeve in five days, going on six."

John Robb, writing in Sounds, noted that:

Last year, Fugazi blasted away the hardcore cobwebs of their Minor Threat past with their stunning debut [EP, Fugazi]. A record of such positive, blistering energy that it left most of the fat and sweaty U.S. competition grovelling on its ass. [Margin Walker] does not quite make the anticipated crazy leap to godlike status, but the Washington, D.C. four-piece have still delivered a crunching blow to the jaw of the mundane majority. [...] Still in command of a spine-tingling, nerve-edge excitement, Fugazi march further forward in the pursuit of sonic soulcore celebration.

In a 2014 retrospective piece on 13 Songs, Washington City Paper's Brandon Gentry writes that "[w]hile Margin Walker sounds more polished than Fugazi, it doesn’t lack in intensity or intelligence. The title track’s stunray guitar and elastic bass lines are the ideal backdrop for MacKaye’s and Picciotto’s traded lyrical barbs. “And the Same” combines slashing chords and shouted invective into a scathing diatribe against racism and retrograde thinking. “Promises” is an insightful meditation on trust, betrayal, and the acceptance of disappointment."

== Covers ==
"Margin Walker" was covered live by Wild Flag. "Provisional" was covered by The Dirty Nil as a b-side to their "No Weaknesses" single. Ryan Adams covered the track "Promises" live.

== Track listing ==
All tracks are written by Fugazi.

No.	Title	Lead Vocals	Length
1.	"Margin Walker"	Picciotto	2:30
2.	"And the Same"	MacKaye	3:27
3.	"Burning Too"	MacKaye	2:50
4.	"Provisional"	Picciotto	2:17
5.	"Lockdown"	Picciotto	2:10
6.	"Promises"	MacKaye	4:02
Total length:			17:08

== Personnel ==
- Ian MacKaye – vocals & guitar
- Guy Picciotto – vocals
- Joe Lally – bass
- Brendan Canty – drums
