= Under and In =

Studio album by Glifted
- Released: October 22, 2002
- Genre: Shoegaze
- Length: 41:43
- Label: Martian Go Home

Professional ratings
Review scores
Source	Rating
AllMusic	4.5/5 stars
Pitchfork	8.6/10

Under and In is the only studio album by the shoegaze band Glifted. It was released in 2002.

== Track listing ==
No.	Title	Length
1.	"Is There Any Always"	4:36
2.	"The Scare"	3:02
3.	"On and On"	2:48
4.	"Baby's Blue"	3:30
5.	"Heavy Ion"	1:42
6.	"Last in Line"	3:18
7.	"Every Single Second"	2:45
8.	"The Ground"	2:23
9.	"Red Lift"	4:30
10.	"Dromoscope"	3:24
11.	"[unknown]"	9:45
