= Next Magazine (Santa Monica) =

Next Magazine was an American music trade publication, distributed to record labels, radio stations, retail outlets, and artist management. Its hybrid content primarily addressed new music releases, technology and the business of music including the issue of payola, its ramifications and possible enforcement actions by the Federal Communications Commission (FCC).

== History ==
Next produced two weekly newsletters: Next At Retail which carried news stories and new music release dates between magazines, and Next Flash, which covered unsigned artists and A&R News. Next Flash was acquired in a buyout and the name changed from Gordon’s Flash. Next also provided a number of direct mail services for the music industry.

n. design was Next’s in-house ad agency and was responsible for music and film CD/DVD packaging and designs, including the soundtrack for the film The Crow: City of Angels.

In May 1998, the magazine's Wilshire Boulevard offices were the focus of a four-page feature in Interior Design magazine. Next's offices occupied half of the top floor of a Santa Monica art deco building, designed by the firm Frank + Frisch. It was designed to provide every office with an ocean facing view.

Next magazine and its associated properties were founded by Bryan Boyd and John Van Citters. Boyd and also Van Citters created Virtuallyalternative which, along with The Album Network, Network 40 and Urban Network, was later acquired by Clear Channel Communications in a cash deal valued at over $75 million.

Next magazine’s design and imaging was created by Grammy nominated designers Todd Gallopo and Tim Stedman, then extended by art director and creative director Chris Jones.

It was the first music trade magazine with radio monitors including ids, drops, commercials, and jock rap; the first to address politics and its role in pop culture and broadcasting; the first to cover the role China plays in copyright and intellectual property theft, and the first to include lifestyle editorial in every issue, including book reviews and city travel coverage

Cover stories for Next included Screaming Trees, Soundgarden, Tori Amos, Stone Temple Pilots, Iggy Pop, Alice in Chains, Sebadoh, Social Distortion, Bob Mould, and Midnight Oil.
