= 9353 =

- Origin: Washington, D.C., United States
- Genres: Post-punk, punk rock, experimental rock
- Years active: 1983–1986, reunions
- Labels: R&B Records, Fountain of Youth Records

9353 was an American post-punk band based in Washington, D.C., active primarily from 1983 to 1986. The group was part of the city's alternative music scene and was noted for its theatrical live performances and stylistic divergence from the region's dominant hardcore punk movement.

== History ==
The band was formed in 1983 by vocalist Bruce Merkle (later known as Bruce Hellington), bassist Vance Bockis (previously of The Obsessed), guitarist Jason Carmer (formerly of Double-O), and a drum machine. Drummer Dan Joseph joined shortly afterward. Their debut album, To Whom It May Consume, was released in 1984 by the independent label R&B Records. Writing in The Washington Post, critic Mike Joyce described the album as "not only musically exact and accomplished for a first effort, but also realizes most of its ambitions."

Their second album, We Are Absolutely Sure There Is No God, was released in 1985 on Fountain of Youth Records. Following internal changes, the band disbanded in 1986.

The group reunited periodically in later years with various lineups, often centered around Hellington.

== Musical style ==
9353 combined post-punk and experimental rock with elements of performance art. Their sound included surreal or satirical lyrics and theatrical stage presence, and was considered distinct from the hardcore punk typical of Washington, D.C., at the time.

== Discography ==
=== Studio albums ===
- To Whom It May Consume (1984, R&B Records)
- We Are Absolutely Sure There Is No God (1985, Fountain of Youth Records)

=== Compilation appearances ===
- "Ten Witches" on Bouncing Babies (1984, Fountain of Youth Records)
