= Post-hardcore =

Music genre

- Stylistic origins: Hardcore punk; post-punk; noise rock
- Cultural origins: 1980s, United States
- Derivative forms: Blackgaze; emo rap; mathcore; math rock; post-metal

Subgenres
- Emo (screamo); Nintendocore; pop screamo; sass

Fusion genres
- Crunkcore

Regional scenes
- South Wales; Texas

Local scenes
- Chicago; Olympia; San Diego; Washington D.C.

Other topics
- Art punk; metalcore; list of bands

Post-hardcore is a punk rock music genre that maintains the aggression and intensity of hardcore punk but emphasizes a greater degree of creative expression. Like the term "post-punk", the term "post-hardcore" has been applied to a broad constellation of groups. Initially taking inspiration from post-punk and noise rock, post-hardcore began in the 1980s with bands like Hüsker Dü and Minutemen. The genre expanded in the 1980s and 1990s with releases by bands from cities which had established hardcore scenes, such as Fugazi from Washington, D.C. as well as groups such as Big Black, Jawbox, Quicksand, and Shellac who stuck closer to post-hardcore's noise rock roots. Dischord Records became a major nexus of post-hardcore during this period.

The genre also began to incorporate more dense, complex, and atmospheric instrumentals with bands like Slint and Unwound, and also experienced some crossover from indie rock with bands like The Dismemberment Plan. In the early- and mid-2000s, post-hardcore achieved mainstream success with the popularity of bands like At the Drive-In, My Chemical Romance, Dance Gavin Dance, Glassjaw, AFI, Underoath, Hawthorne Heights, Silverstein, the Used, Saosin, Alexisonfire, and Senses Fail. In the 2010s, bands like Sleeping with Sirens and Pierce the Veil achieved mainstream success under the post-hardcore label. Meanwhile, bands like Title Fight and La Dispute experienced underground popularity playing music that bore a closer resemblance to the post-hardcore bands of the 1980s and 1990s.

== Characteristics ==
Hardcore punk typically features very fast tempos, loud volume, and heavy bass levels, as well as a "do-it-yourself" ethic. Music database AllMusic stated "These newer bands, termed post-hardcore, often found complex and dynamic ways of blowing off steam that generally went outside the strict hardcore realm of 'loud fast rules'. Additionally, many of these bands' vocalists were just as likely to deliver their lyrics with a whispered croon as they were a maniacal yelp." AllMusic also claims that post-hardcore bands find creative ways to build and release tension rather than "airing their dirty laundry in short, sharp, frenetic bursts". Jeff Terich of Treblezine stated, "Instead of sticking to hardcore's rigid constraints, these artists expanded beyond power chords and gang vocals, incorporating more creative outlets for punk rock energy." Post-hardcore generally incorporates more complex chord shapes and progressions. According to SiriusXM, "tempos could be slow, or as fast as metal, and singing was allowed to be inventive."

British post-punk of the late 1970s and early 1980s has been seen as influential on the musical development of post-hardcore bands. As the genre progressed, some of these groups also experimented with a wide array of influences, including soul, dub, funk, jazz, and dance-punk. It has also been noted that since some post-hardcore bands included members that were rooted in the beginnings of hardcore punk, some of them were able to expand their sound as they became more skilled musicians. During the early 2000s it became common for mainstream "melodic" post-hardcore bands to crossover into other related genres like melodic hardcore, metalcore, beatdown hardcore, indie rock, screamo, and emo, straddling experimentation and accessibility.

== History ==
=== Origins (1980s) ===
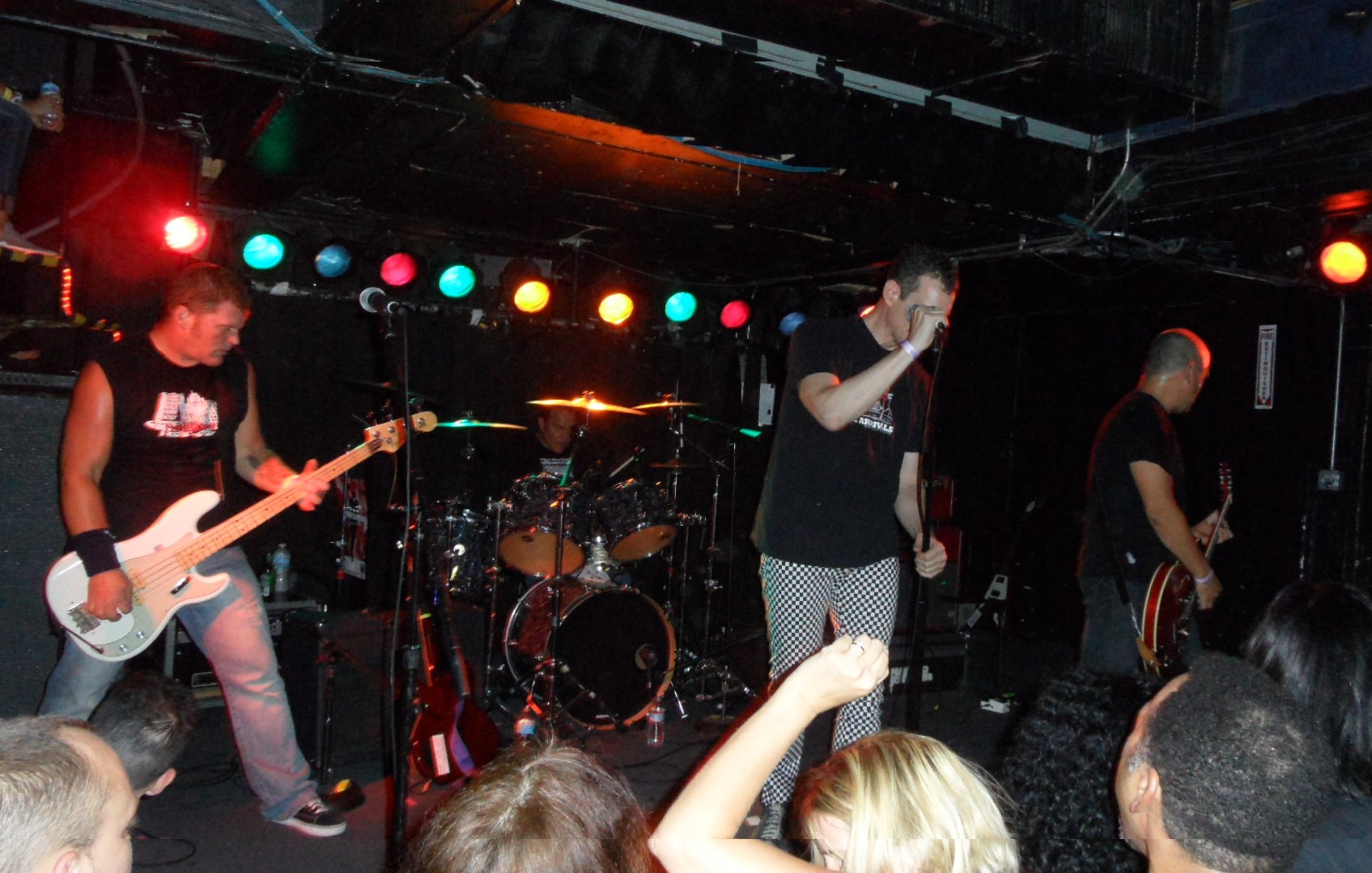
Naked Raygun in 2012

Groups such as Minutemen, Naked Raygun, and The Effigies, which were active around the early 1980s, are considered to be forerunners to the post-hardcore genre. Naked Raygun's Jeff Pezzati and Effigies frontman John Kezdy have disputed this classification, however, insisting that neither band was drawing from hardcore, and were instead influenced by British punk acts like Buzzcocks, Sex Pistols, and The Stranglers. Los Angeles' Saccharine Trust mixed Minutemen's sound with that of post-punk acts The Fall and Gang of Four on early releases like their EP Paganicons, helping to further the burgeoning genre.

During the early- to mid-1980s, the desire to experiment with hardcore's basic template expanded to many musicians that had been associated with the genre or had strong roots in it. Many of these groups also took inspiration from the 1980s noise rock scene pioneered by Sonic Youth. Some bands signed to the independent label Homestead Records, including Squirrel Bait, David Grubbs-related bands Bastro and Bitch Magnet, and Steve Albini's Big Black, Rapeman, and Shellac are also associated with post-hardcore. Big Black, which also featured former Naked Raygun guitarist Santiago Durango, made themselves known for their strict DIY ethic, related to practices such as paying for their own recordings, booking their own shows, handling their own management and publicity, and remaining "stubbornly independent at a time when many independent bands were eagerly reaching out for the major-label brass ring". The band's music, punctuated by the use of a drum machine, has also been seen as influential to industrial rock, while Blush has also described the Albini-fronted project as "an angst-ridden response to the rigid English post-punk of Gang of Four". After the issuing of the "Il Duce" single and between the release of their only two full-length studio albums, Big Black left Homestead for Touch and Go Records, which would later reissue not only their entire discography, but would also be responsible for the release of the complete works of Scratch Acid, an act from Austin, Texas described as post-hardcore, that, according to Stephen Thomas Erlewine, "laid the groundwork for much of the distorted, grinding alternative punk rockers of the '90s".

According to Ryan Cooper of About.com and author Doyle Greene, 1980s hardcore punk band Black Flag is one of the pioneers of post-hardcore for the experimental style the band started playing later on in the 1980s. In 1984, Minneapolis punk band Hüsker Dü released their second studio album, Zen Arcade, considered a key post-hardcore record. Upon its release, the album received positive critical reception from The New York Times and Rolling Stone. Outside the United States, post-hardcore would take shape in the works of the Canadian group Nomeansno, related with Jello Biafra and his independently run label Alternative Tentacles, and that had been active since 1979. The magazine Dusted noted that the group's 1989's release Wrong was "one of the most aggressive and powerful opuses in post-hardcore ever made".

==== The Washington D.C. scene ====
During the years 1984 and 1985 in the Washington, D.C. hardcore scene, a new movement had "swept over". This movement was led by bands associated with the D.C. independent record label Dischord Records, home in the early 1980s to seminal hardcore bands such as Minor Threat, State of Alert, Void, and Government Issue. According to the Dischord website: "The violence and nihilism that had become identified with punk rock, largely by the media, had begun to take hold in DC and many of the older punks suddenly found themselves repelled and discouraged by their hometown scene", leading to "a time of redefinition". When The Faith put out the EP Subject to Change in 1983, it marked a critical evolution in the sound of D.C. hardcore and punk music in general. During these years, a new wave of bands started to form, these included Rites of Spring (which featured The Faith former guitarist Eddie Janney), Lunchmeat (later to become Soulside), Gray Matter, Mission Impossible, Dag Nasty and Embrace, the latter featuring former Minor Threat singer and Dischord co-founder Ian MacKaye and former members of The Faith. This movement has been since widely known as the "Revolution Summer". Rites of Spring has been described as the band that "more than led the change", challenging the "macho posturing that had become so prevalent within the punk scene at that point", and "more importantly", defying "musical and stylistic rule". Journalist Steve Huey writes that while the band "strayed from hardcore's typically external concerns of the time – namely, social and political dissent – their musical attack was no less blistering, and in fact a good deal more challenging and nuanced than the average three-chord speed-blur", a sound that, according to Huey, mapped out "a new direction for hardcore that built on the innovations" brought by Hüsker Dü's Zen Arcade. Other bands have been perceived as taking inspiration from genres such as funk (as in the case of Beefeater) and 1960s pop (such as the example of Gray Matter).

According to Eric Grubbs, a nickname was developed for the new sound, with some considering it "post-harDCore". Another name used for the scene was "emo-core". The latter, mentioned in skateboarding magazine Thrasher, would come up in discussions around the D.C. area. While some of these bands have been considered contributors to the birth of emo, with Rites of Spring sometimes being named as the first or one of the earliest emo acts, musicians such as the band's former frontman Guy Picciotto and MacKaye himself have voiced their opposition against the term. In the nearby state of Maryland, similar bands that are categorized now as post-hardcore would also emerge, these include Moss Icon and the Hated. The former's music contained, according to Steve Huey, "shifting dynamics, chiming guitar arpeggios, and screaming, crying vocal climaxes", which would prove to be influential to later musicians in spite of the band's unstable existence. This group has also been considered one of the earliest emo acts.

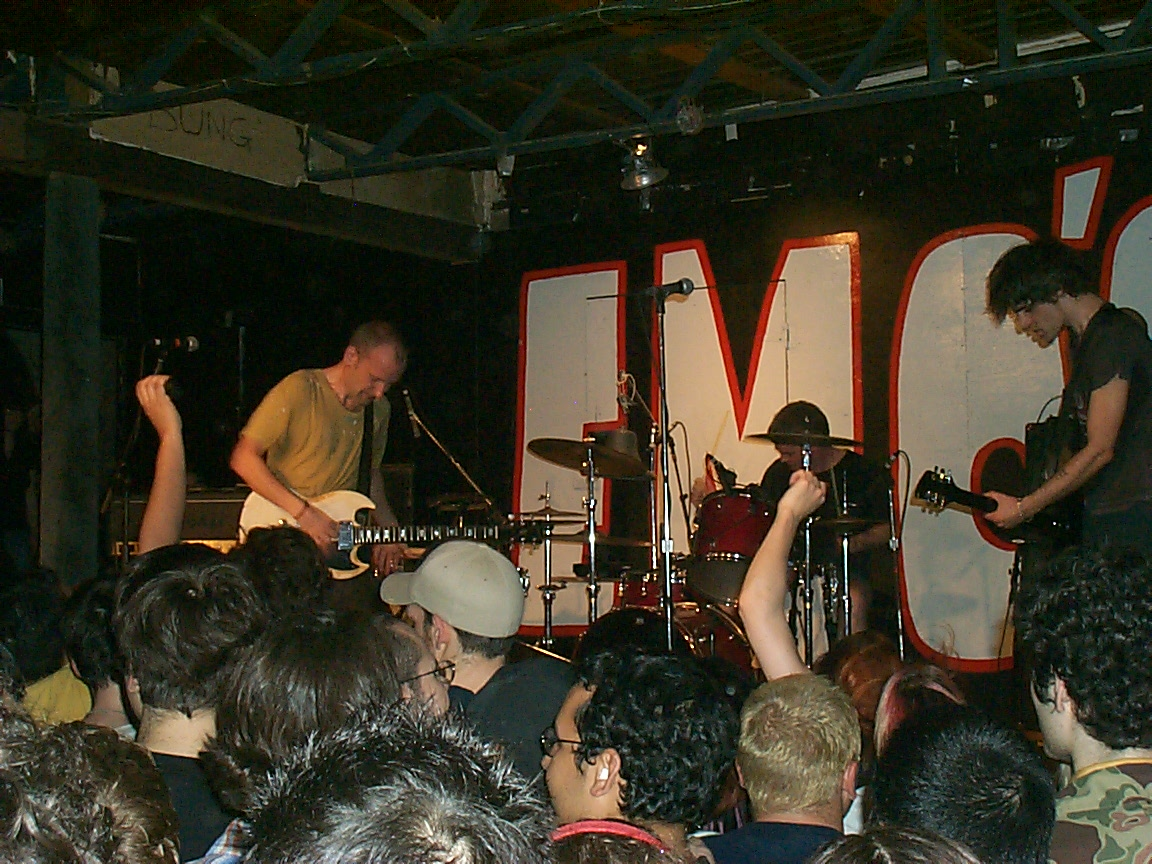
Fugazi during their last pre-hiatus tour, 2002. The band's influence was summarized by reviewer Andy Kellman with the following statement: "To many, Fugazi meant as much to them as Bob Dylan did to their parents."

The second half of the 1980s saw the formation of several bands in D.C., which included Shudder to Think, Jawbox, the Nation of Ulysses, and Fugazi, as well as Baltimore's Lungfish. MacKaye described this period as the busiest that the Dischord Records label had ever seen. Most of these acts, along with earlier ones, would contribute to the 1989 compilation State of the Union, a release that documented the new sound of the late 1980s D.C. punk scene. Fugazi gained "an extremely loyal and numerous global following", with reviewer Andy Kellman summarizing the band's influence with the statement: "To many, Fugazi meant as much to them as Bob Dylan did to their parents." It has also been noted that the group's "ever-evolving" sound would signal a more experimental turn in hardcore that paved the way for later Dischord releases. The band, which included MacKaye, Picciotto, and former Rites of Spring drummer Brendan Canty along with bassist Joe Lally, issued in 1989 13 Songs, a compilation of their earlier self-titled and Margin Walker EPs, which is now considered a landmark album. Similarly, the band's debut studio album, 1990's Repeater, has also been "generally" regarded as a classic. The group also garnered recognition for their activism, cheaply priced shows and CDs, and their resistance to mainstream outlets. On the other hand, Jawbox had been influenced by "the tradition of Chicago's thriving early-'80s scene", while the Nation of Ulysses are "best remembered for lifting the motor-mouthed revolutionary rhetoric of the MC5" with the incorporation of "elements of R&B (as filtered through the MC5) and avant jazz" combined with "exciting, volatile live gigs", and being the inspiration for "a new crop of bands both locally and abroad".

=== Expansion (late 1980s and 1990s) ===
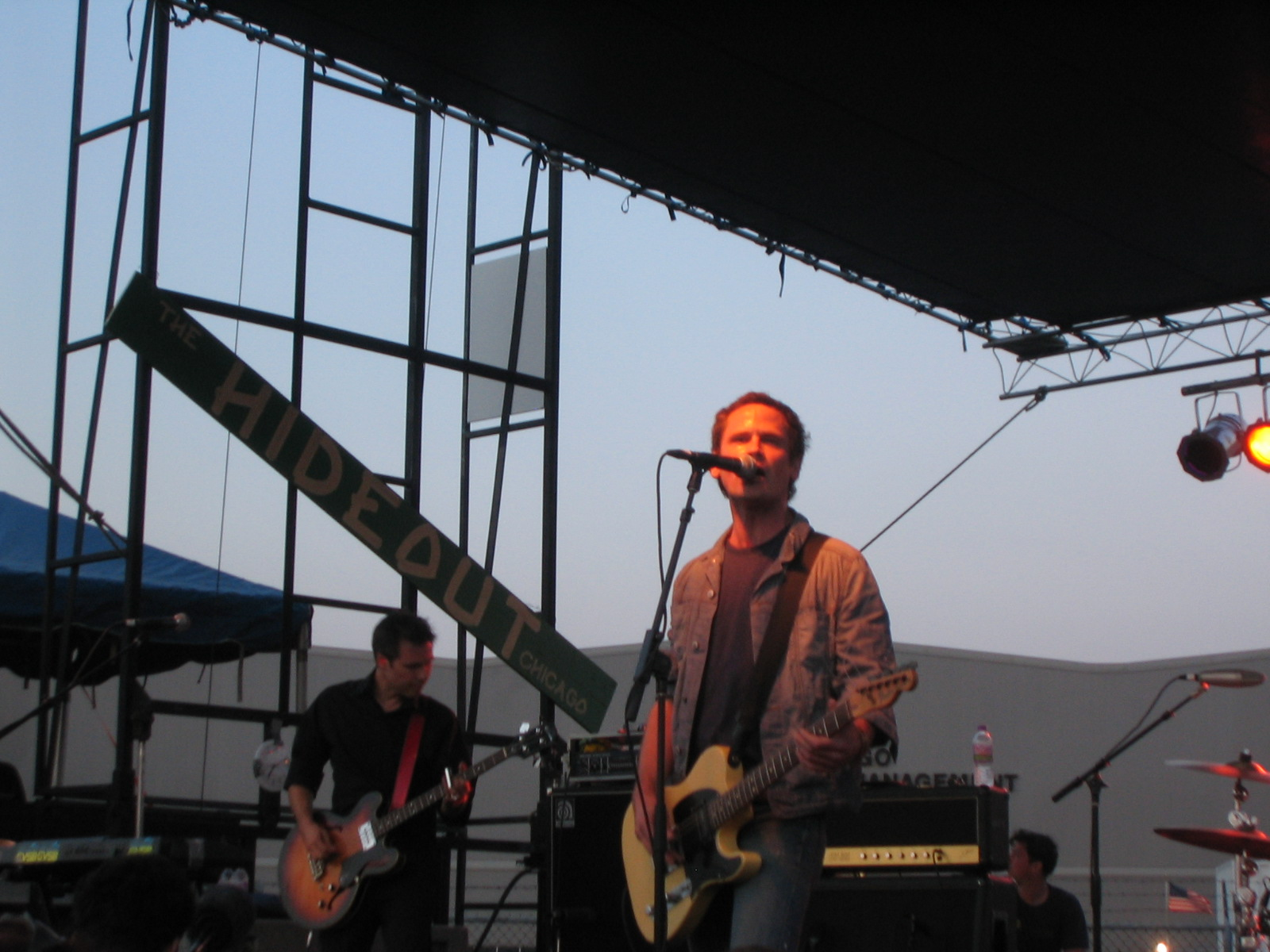
Post-hardcore band Girls Against Boys in 2006

The late 1980s and early 1990s saw the formation and rise to prominence of several bands associated with earlier acts that not only included the examples of Fugazi and Shellac, but also Girls Against Boys (originally a side-project of Brendan Canty and Eli Janney, which would later incorporate members of Soulside), The Jesus Lizard (formed by ex-members of Scratch Acid), Quicksand (fronted by former Youth of Today and Gorilla Biscuits member Walter Schreifels), Rollins Band (led by former Black Flag singer Henry Rollins), Tar (which raised from the ashes of a hardcore outfit named Blatant Dissent), and Slint (containing members of Squirrel Bait). Acts such as Shellac and Louisville's Slint have been considered influential to the development of the genre of math rock, with the former featuring "awkward time signatures and trademark aggression" that has come to characterize "a certain slant" on math rock, while the latter presented "instrumental music seeped in dramatic tension but set to rigid systems of solid-structured guitar patterns and percussive repetition". According to reviewer Jason Arkeny, Slint's "deft, extremist manipulations of volume, tempo, and structure cast them as clear progenitors of the post-rock movement".

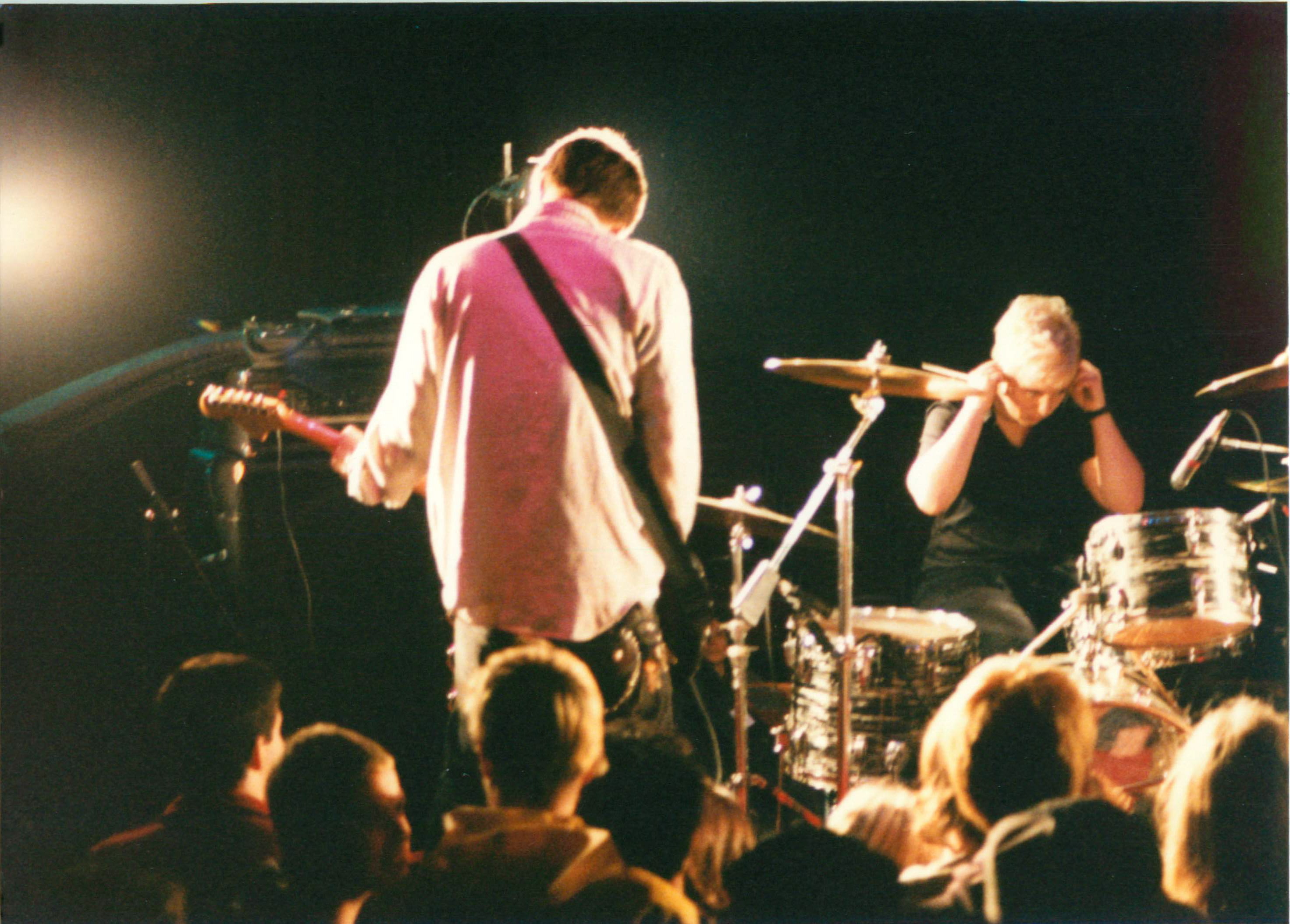
Unwound emerged from Olympia, Washington.

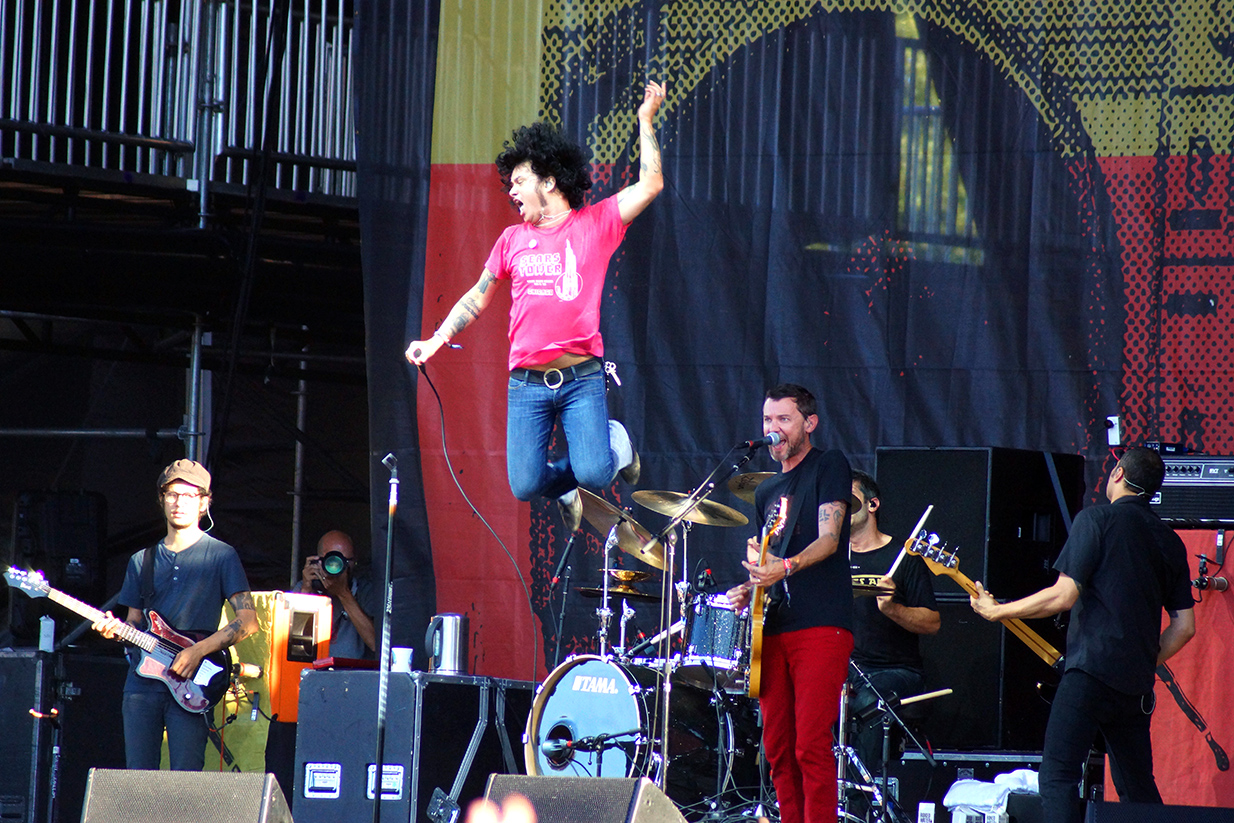
At the Drive-In performing at Lollapalooza 2012

AllMusic has noted that younger bands "flowered into post-hardcore after cutting their teeth in high school punk bands". In Washington D.C., new bands such as Hoover (as well as the related The Crownhate Ruin), Circus Lupus, Bluetip, and Smart Went Crazy were added to the Dischord roster. Hoover has been cited by journalist Charles Spano as a band that had "a tremendous impact on post-hardcore music". In New York City, in addition to Quicksand, post-hardcore bands such as Helmet, Unsane, Chavez and Texas Is the Reason emerged. Chicago, which alongside the Midwestern United States has been important to the progression of math rock, also saw the birth of post-hardcore acts such as the examples of Shellac, Tar, Trenchmouth, and the Jade Tree-released group Cap'n Jazz (as well as the subsequent related project Joan of Arc, which also released their work through Jade Tree). Steve Huey argues that the release of Cap'n Jazz's retrospective compilation album Analphabetapolothology helped spread the band's influence "far beyond their original audience", while also considering the group as influential for the development of emo in the independent music scene. Champaign, also in Illinois, was known for an independent scene that would give way to groups like Hum, Braid and Poster Children. The American Northwest saw the creation of acts such as Karp, Lync and Unwound, all hailing from the Olympia, Washington area. The latter's music has been considered by critic John Bush to be a combination of "the noise of Sonic Youth's more raucous passages" with a "rare energetic flair which rivals even that of Fugazi". Texas saw the formation of groups such as The Jesus Lizard (later to be based in Chicago) and ...And You Will Know Us by the Trail of Dead in Austin, and At the Drive-In from El Paso. This last band was known for their energy in both performances and music, and for their "driving melodic punk riffs, meshed together with quieter interlocking note-picking". Kansas City, Missouri bands of the early 90s also contributed significantly to the genre including Season to Risk.

The genre also saw representation outside the United States in Refused who emerged from the Umeå, Sweden music scene. The band, which made itself known earlier in their career for its "massive hardcore sound", released in 1998 The Shape of Punk to Come, an album that saw the group take inspiration from the Nation of Ulysses while incorporating elements such as "ambient textures, jazz breakdowns", metal and electronica to their hardcore sound.

==== The San Diego scene ====
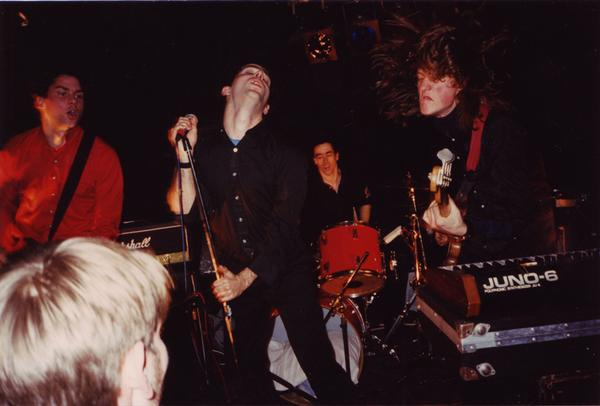
The VSS performing in 1997. While formed in Boulder, Colorado, the group has been associated with the post-hardcore sound developed in San Diego and led by independent labels like Gravity.

The early-to-mid 1990s saw the birth of several bands in the San Diego, California music scene, some of which would lead a post-hardcore movement associated with the independent label Gravity Records. This movement eventually became known as the "San Diego sound". Gravity was founded in 1991 by Matt Anderson, member of the band Heroin, as a means to release the music of his band and of other related San Diego groups, which also included Antioch Arrow and Clikatat Ikatowi. The label's earlier releases are known for the definition of "a new sound in hardcore rooted in tradition but boasting a chaotic sound that showcased a new approach" to the genre. Heroin were known for being innovators of early 1990s hardcore and for making dynamic landscapes "out of one minute blasts of noisy vitriol". These bands were influenced by acts like Fugazi and The Nation of Ulysses, while also helping propagate an offshoot of hardcore that "grafted spastic intensity to willfully experimental dissonance and dynamics". This movement has been associated to the development of the subgenre of screamo, while it also should be noticed that this term has been, as with the case of emo, the subject of controversy. The label also featured releases by non-San Diego bands that included Mohinder (from Cupertino, California), Angel Hair and its subsequent related project The VSS (from Boulder, Colorado), groups that have also been associated with this sound. The VSS was known for their use of synthesizers "vying with post-hardcore's rabid atonality".

Outside the Gravity roster, another band that played an important role in the development of the "San Diego sound" was Drive Like Jehu. This group, founded by former members of Pitchfork, was known, according to Steve Huey, for their lengthy and multisectioned compositions based on the innovations brought by the releases on Dischord, incorporating elements such as "odd time signatures played an important role on its development in spite of the band's music not resembling the sound such term would later signify. In a similar manner, Swing Kids, composed of former members of hardcore bands from the San Diego scene such as Unbroken, Struggle and Spanakorzo, have been described by journalist Zach Baron as the moment in which the "hardcore" sound of bands like Unbroken effectively became "post-hardcore", known for "covering Joy Division songs" and for its sonic "jazz-quoting" and "guitar feedback" experimentation features. They were also one of the first bands released under the independent label Three One G, founded by the band's vocalist Justin Pearson and later known for releasing the works of several other post-hardcore, noise rock, mathcore and grindcore groups.

Bands like At the Drive-In have acknowledged the influence of the post-hardcore sound coming from the San Diego scene, with vocalist Cedric Bixler-Zavala citing elements such as "screaming vocals with over-the-top emotions, calculated, heavy riffs, [...] offbeat rhythms" and an "incredible amount of energy, chaos and melody" put by these groups as crucial in the development of his band's sound.

==== Moderate popularity ====
According to Ian MacKaye, the sudden interest in underground and independent music brought by the success of Nirvana's Nevermind attracted the attention of major labels towards the Dischord imprint and many of its bands. While the label rejected these offers, two Dischord acts, Jawbox and Shudder to Think, would sign deals with major labels. The former's signing to Atlantic Records would alienate some of the band's long-term fanbase, but it would also help with the development and recording of the 1994 release For Your Own Special Sweetheart, considered by Andy Kellman to be "one of the best releases to come out of the fertile D.C. scene of the '80s and '90s". The subsequent tour for the album and the MTV rotation of some videos would introduce the band to a handful of new crowds, but ultimately the album would remain "unnoticed outside of the usual indie community".

Likewise, outside of the Dischord label, Quicksand became the first post-hardcore act to sign a major label record deal (with Polydor Records) in 1992. Interscope Records would sign Helmet after a reportedly "ferocious" bidding war between several major record companies, and while MTV would air some videos by the group, which by the time of the release of their major-label debut Meantime, was considered then "the only band close to the Seattle grunge sound" on the American East Coast and would be hailed as "the next big thing", these expectations would "never be fully realized" in spite of the record's later influence. In another notable case, Hum was signed to RCA in 1994, selling approximately 250,000 copies of their album You'd Prefer an Astronaut fueled by the success of the album's lead single "Stars", and while the band had established by this point a strong underground fanbase, this would prove to be "the pinnacle of Hum's media attention", as its follow-up, 1998's Downward Is Heavenward would sell poorly, resulting in the decision of RCA to drop the band from their roster.

=== 2000s (mainstream success) ===
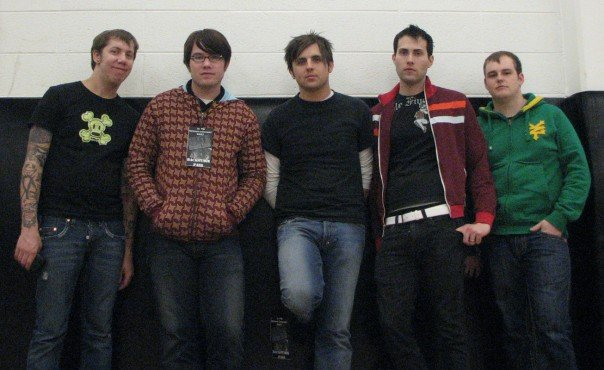
Post-hardcore band Hawthorne Heights in 2007

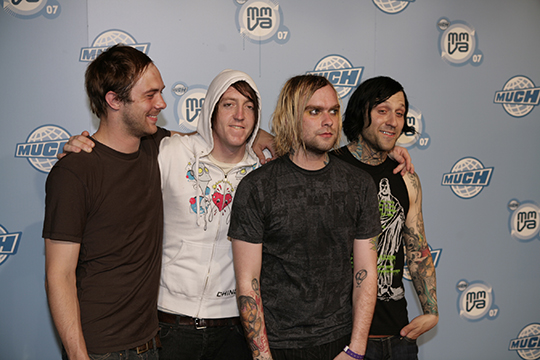
Post-hardcore band The Used in 2007

Record producer Ross Robinson, who was credited for popularizing nu metal with bands like Korn, Slipknot, Soulfly and Limp Bizkit in the 1990s, helped post-hardcore achieve popularity during the 2000s. Mehan Jayasuriya of PopMatters suggested that Robinson's sudden focus on post-hardcore was his "pet project" designed to redeem himself of "the 'Nu-Metal' scourge of the late '90s". Robinson recorded At the Drive-In's Relationship of Command (2000), Glassjaw's Everything You Ever Wanted to Know About Silence (2000) and Worship and Tribute (2002), and the Blood Brothers' ...Burn, Piano Island, Burn (2003); four albums that are said to "stand as some of the best post-hardcore records produced" during the 2000s. In John Franck's review of Everything You Ever Wanted to Know About Silence for Allmusic, he stated: "Featuring extraordinary ambidextrous drummer Sammy Siegler (of Gorilla Biscuits/CIV fame), Glassjaw has paired up with producer/entrepreneur Ross Robinson (a key catalyst in the reinvention of the aggro rock sound) to take you on a pummeling ride that would make Bad Brains and Quicksand proud."

These bands allowed the genre to grow and become much more varied with At the Drive-In taking influence from art rock and rock and roll, and Glassjaw using elements of both pop music and heavy metal; furthermore, bands such as Hell Is for Heroes, Hundred Reasons, Hondo Maclean and Funeral for a Friend took significant influence from heavy metal bands like Pantera as well as hardcore bands like the Hope Conspiracy. Post-hardcore achieved mainstream success with the success of emo post-hardcore bands such as My Chemical Romance, Senses Fail, Alexisonfire, Taking Back Sunday, Brand New, Thrice, AFI, the Used, Silverstein, From First To Last, Thursday and Hawthorne Heights. Some bands also began to incorporate progressive elements; with bands such as Chiodos, Scary Kids Scaring Kids, Circa Survive, the Fall of Troy and Dance Gavin Dance gaining significant success, and bands such as Damiera, the Sound of Animals Fighting, The Bled, Norma Jean and the Chariot being left under the wood works; as well as bands taking influence from metalcore like Ice Nine Kills, Blessthefall and Pierce the Veil, inspired by acts such as Killswitch Engage, Avenged Sevenfold and Atreyu. Johnny Loftus of AllMusic wrote in 2004 that "what's now known as post-hardcore has been consistently codified into something eminently marketable. Screaming bloody murder over churning angular guitars has suddenly salable qualities, as long as the rage is offset by whimpering pianos and heart-flailing harmonies."

=== 2010s–present (continued underground popularity) ===
Beginning to form in the late 2000s, the fourth wave of emo came into full fruition in the early 2010s. Moment defining bands like Modern Baseball, the Hotelier and Joyce Manor all gained significant success in the underground, and new takes on post-hardcore became prominent with the sonic experimentation of Drug Church, Title Fight, The World Is a Beautiful Place & I Am No Longer Afraid to Die and Citizen. At the same time "the wave", or "new wave of post-hardcore", was a movement of bands reviving 1990s emo, screamo and post-hardcore sounds. The name was originally coined to refer to only Touché Amoré, La Dispute, Defeater, Pianos Become the Teeth and Make Do and Mend, however by 2014 had expanded to also include groups Balance and Composure, Into It. Over It. and Title Fight. In 2011 Alternative Press noted that La Dispute is "at the forefront of a traditional-screamo revival" for their critically acclaimed release Wildlife, while a 2014 article by Treble called Touché Amoré "the one band carrying the sound forward in the most interesting ways". By 2015, many of the original acts in the movement had either gone on hiatus or entered periods of inactivity.

Later forms of post-hardcore have garnered more mainstream attention with bands such as Sleeping with Sirens, whose third album Feel (2013) debuted at No. 3 on the US Billboard 200 chart, making it one of the highest charting post-hardcore albums by any band to date. Pierce the Veil's third album, Collide with the Sky (2012), has also received much attention. While Madness (2015) and Misadventures (2016)—by Sleeping with Sirens and Pierce the Veil respectively—incorporate more elements of pop rock and pop punk, entering territory that many find to be loosely defined as post-hardcore. Seen also is the emergence of independent post-hardcore bands like the Men, Cloud Nothings and METZ, who are moved closer to the dynamics and aesthetics of earlier acts, whilst diverging deeper into external influences. Reviewers have also noted the incorporation of a diversity of elements like krautrock, post-rock, sludge metal, shoegaze, power pop and no wave in addition to previous hardcore, noise rock and post-punk sensibilities.

== See also ==
- List of post-hardcore bands

== Bibliography ==
- Andersen, Mark and Mark Jenkins (2003). Dance of Days: Two Decades of Punk in the Nation's Capital. Akashic Books. ISBN 1-888451-44-0
- Azzerad, Michael (2002). Our Band Could Be Your Life: Scenes from the American Indie Underground 1981–1991. Back Bay Books. ISBN 0-316-78753-1
- Grubbs, Eric (2008). POST: A Look at the Influence of Post-Hardcore-1985-2007. Bloomington, IN: iUniverse, Inc. ISBN 978-0-595-51835-7.
- Reynolds, Simon. The Blasting Concept: Progressive Punk from SST Records to Mission of Burma. Rip It Up and Start Again: Post-punk 1978–84. London: Faber and Faber, Ltd., 2005.
