= Dischord Records discography =

Recording catalog

Dischord Records is an independent record label specializing in the punk rock music of the Washington, D.C., hardcore scene. The company is co-owned by Ian MacKaye and Jeff Nelson, who founded the label in December 1980. Before founding Dischord, both MacKaye and Nelson were members of the Teen Idles, and the label was initially meant to only foster a single release from the defunct band, the Minor Disturbance EP. By the time Dischord #1 was finished, many new bands had emerged from the same music scene, and like the Teen Idles, also began releasing their records through Dischord.

Bands such as Minor Threat, Government Issue, The Faith, Void, Youth Brigade, Iron Cross, Embrace, Rites of Spring, The Nation of Ulysses, The Make-Up, Scream, Soulside, Gray Matter, Jawbox, Marginal Man, Shudder to Think, Dag Nasty, Lungfish and Fugazi have released records on the label. The 2000s saw additions to the Dischord roster like Q and Not U, Beauty Pill, Faraquet, Black Eyes, and The Aquarium, while the 2010s had releases from Office of Future Plans, The EFFECTS, The Messthetics, and archival releases from several early Dischord bands.

== Catalog ==
This list is organized by catalog number, a roughly chronological number system established by the label and typically printed on or assigned to each official release. However, unlike many record labels with similar systems, smaller releases such as singles, split albums, and co-releases with other labels have often been assigned a catalog number using a fraction or decimal.

=== Main catalog ===
Year	No.	Artist	Title	Format	Tracklist count	Co-releases	Note
2024	0	The Slinkees	Who Cares?	7" vinyl	5		Recorded in 1979
1980	1	Teen Idles	Minor Disturbance	Digital	8		
1981	2	State of Alert	No Policy	Digital	10		
1981	3	Minor Threat	Minor Threat	7" vinyl	8		
1981	4	Government Issue	Legless Bull	Digital	10		
1981	4.5	Necros	I.Q. 32	7" vinyl	9	Touch and Go Records #3	
1981	5	Minor Threat	In My Eyes	None	4	Limp Records	
1981	6	Youth Brigade	Possible	Digital	8		
1982	7	Various Artists	Flex Your Head	12" vinyl, digital	32	Alternative Tentacles (UK release)	Compilation album of eleven D.C. Hardcore bands.
1982	7.5	SSD	The Kids Will Have Their Say		18	X-Claim Records	N/A
1982	8	Void / Faith	Void / Faith Split	12" vinyl, digital	12		N/A
1982	8.5	Iron Cross	Skinhead Glory		4	Skinflint Records	N/A
1983	9	Scream	Still Screaming	12" vinyl, digital	17		N/A
1983	10	Minor Threat	Out of Step	12" vinyl, digital	9		N/A
1983	10.5	Double-O	You've Lost		5	R & B Records	N/A
1983	10.75	Government Issue	Boycott Stabb	None	11	Fountain of Youth Records; Giant Records (2nd pressing)	N/A
1983	10.875	United Mutation	Fugitive Family	Digital		D.S.I. Records	N/A
1983	11	Faith	Subject to Change	Digital			N/A
1984	12	Minor Threat	Minor Threat (First Two Seven Inches)	12" vinyl, digital			N/A
1984	13	Marginal Man	Identity	Digital			N/A
1984	14	Various Artists	Dischord 1981: The Year in Seven Inches (Four Old Seven Inches)	CD, 12" vinyl			N/A
1985	15	Minor Threat	Salad Days	7" vinyl, digital			N/A
1985	15.5	Scream	This Side Up	12" vinyl		Rough Trade Records	N/A
1985	15.75	Reptile House	I Stumble as the Crow Flies	Digital		Druid Hill	N/A
1985	16	Rites of Spring	Rites of Spring	12" vinyl, digital			N/A
1985	17	Beefeater	Plays for Lovers	None			N/A
1986	18	The Snakes	I Won't Love You 'til You're More Like Me	Digital		Discard Records	N/A
1986	19	Dag Nasty	Can I Say	Digital			N/A
1986	20	Egg Hunt	Egg Hunt	CD, 7" vinyl			N/A
1986	21	Gray Matter	Take it Back	12" vinyl, digital			N/A
1986	21.5	Scream	Banging the Drum	None			Test press only
1987	22	Rites of Spring	All Through a Life	7" vinyl			
1986	22.5	Soulside	Less Deep Inside Keeps			Sammich Records	
1987	23	Beefeater	House Burning Down	None			
1987	24	Embrace	Embrace	12" vinyl, digital			
1987	25	Scream	Banging the Drum	Digital			
1987	26	Dag Nasty	Wig Out at Denko's	12" vinyl, digital			
1987	26.5		Anger Means / Proven Hollow			Ig Records	
1988	26.75	Shudder to Think	It Was Arson			Sammich Records	
1988	27	Minor Threat	Live	None			
1988	28	Fire Party	Fire Party	Digital			
1988	29	Soulside	Trigger	None		Sammich Records	
1988	30	Fugazi	Fugazi	12" vinyl, digital			
1988	31	Ignition	Machination	None		Ig Records	
1989	32	Various Artists	State of the Union	Digital, 12" vinyl			
1989	33	Three	Dark Days Coming	CD, digital			
1990	33.33	Vile Cherubs	Post Humorous Relief			Cherubic Delusions	
1989	33.66	Holy Rollers	Origami Sessions			Adult Swim Records	
1989	34	Soulside	Bass / 103	None			
1989	35	Fugazi	Margin Walker	12" vinyl, digital			
1989	36	Fugazi	13 Songs	CD, digital			
1989	37	Fire Party	New Orleans Opera	Digital			
1989	38	Soulside	Hot Bodi-Gram	Digital			
1990	39	Ignition	Orafying Mysticle	Digital			
1990	40	Minor Threat	Complete Discography	CD			
1989	41	Fidelity Jones	Piltdown Lad	Digital			
1991	42	Holy Rollers	As Is	Digital			
1990	43	Fugazi	3 Songs	7" vinyl		Sub Pop Singles Club	
1990	44	Fugazi	Repeater	12" vinyl, digital			
1990	45	Fugazi	Repeater + 3 Songs	CD, digital			
1990	45.5	Jawbox	Jawbox			DeSoto Records	
1990	46	Shudder to Think	Ten Spot	Digital			
1990	46.5	Nation of Ulysses	The Nation of Ulysses	None		K Records	
1990	47	Fidelity Jones	Venus on Lovely	Free			
1990	48	Gray Matter	Food for Thought	Digital			
1990	49	Gray Matter	Food for Thought/Take It Back	Digital			
1991	50	Skewbald/Grand Union	Skewbald/Grand Union	7" vinyl, digital			
1990	50.5a	Lungfish	Necklace of Heads			Simple Machines	
1990	50.5b	The Snakes	Happy	Digital		Adult Swim Records	
1990	51	Soulside	Soon Come Happy				
1991	52	Jawbox	Grippe				
1991	53	Dag Nasty	Can I Say / Wig Out				
1991	54	Shudder to Think	Funeral at the Movies				
1991	55	Shudder to Think	Funeral at the Movies and Ten Spot				
1991	56	High Back Chairs	Of Two Minds				
1991	57	Nation of Ulysses	13-Point Program to Destroy America				
1991	57.5	Severin	Fire and Sand			Superbad Records	
1991	58	Holy Rollers	Fabuley				
1991	58.5	Gray Matter	4 Songs			WGNS	
1991	59	Holy Rollers	Fabuley / As Is				
1991	60	Fugazi	Steady Diet of Nothing				
1991	60.5	Autoclave	Go Far			K Records	
1992	61	Jawbox	Tongues				
1992	61.5	Desiderata	Desiderata			Desiderata	
1992	62	Nation of Ulysses	The Birth of a Ulysses Aesthetic: The Synthesis of Speed and Transformation				
1992	63	Circus Lupus	Super Genius				
1992	64	Beefeater	Plays for Lovers and House Burning Down				
1992	65	Lungfish	Talking Songs for Walking				
1992	65.5	Autoclave	6 Songs			Mira Records	
1992	66	Lungfish	Talking Songs for Walking / Simple Machines				
1992	67	Shudder to Think	Get Your Goat				
1992	68	Gray Matter	Thog				
1992	68.72	Gray Matter / Severin	split			Superbad Records	
1992	69	Jawbox	Novelty				
1993	70	Fugazi	In on the Kill Taker				
1992	71	Nation of Ulysses	Plays Pretty for Baby				
1992	72	Severin	Acid to Ashes and Rust to Dust				
1992	72.5	Severin	Smash Hits				
1992	73	Circus Lupus	Circus Lupus				
1992	74	High Back Chairs	Share / One Small Step				
1992	75	High Back Chairs	Curiosity and Relief				
1992	75.5	Circus Lupus / Trenchmouth	split			Skene! Records	
1992	76	Shudder to Think	Hit Liquor				
1992	76.5	Suture	Suture			Decomposition Records	
1993	77	Jawbox	Jackpot Plus!				
1993	77.7	Jawbox / Tar	Static (split)			Touch and Go Records	
1993	78	Lungfish	Rainbows from Atoms				
1993	79	Circus Lupus	Solid Brass				
1992	79.5	Hoover	Sidecar Freddie			Hoover Limited	
1999	80	Fugazi	Instrument				
1993	81	Scream	Still Screaming / This Side Up				
1993	82	Scream	Fumble / Banging the Drum				
1993	83	Scream	Fumble				
1993	84	Holy Rollers	Toy				
1993	85	Slant 6	What Kind of Monster Are You				
1993	85.5	Rain Like the Sound of Trains	Washington Bullets			Rebel Music	
1993	86	Holy Rollers	Holy Rollers				
1993	86.5	Hoover	Private			Hoover Limited	
1993	87	Faith/Void	Faith/Void/Faith				
1994	87.5	Rain Like the Sound of Trains	Bad Man's Grave			Rebel Music	
1994	88	Ignition	Complete Services				
1995	89	Hoover	Lurid Traversal of Rte. 7				
1995	90	Fugazi	Red Medicine				
1994	91	Slant 6	Soda Pop * Rip Off				
1995	91.5	Norman Mayer Group	Point Blank / Ketchup			Mira Records	
1994	92	Lungfish	Pass and Stow				
1994	92.5	Severin	Upside Down			Superbad Records	
1995	93	Trusty	Goodbye, Dr. Fate				
1995	93.5	Las Mordidas	Surrounded			Compulsiv Records	
1995	94	Slant 6	Inzombia				
1995	94.5	Antimony	Red Herring			Regulus Records	
1995	95	Branch Manager	Branch Manager				
1995	95.5	Tone	Build			Independent Projects Records	
1995	96	Smart Went Crazy	Now We're Even				
1995	96.5	Rain Like the Sound of Trains	Rain Like the Sound of Trains			Rebel Music	
1996	97	Lungfish	Sound in Time				
1996	97.5	Norman Mayer Group	Real Heart			Monumental Recordings	
1996	97.75	Second Thought	Lily's Stroke			Liberation Communications	
1996	98	The Crownhate Ruin	Until the Eagle Grins				
1996	98.5	The Delta 72	On the Rocks			Kill Rock Stars	
1996	98.75	Corm	The Conservation of Momentum			Shute Records	
1996	99	The Make-Up	Destination: Love - Live! At Cold Rice				
1996	99.5	Lungfish	2 Songs			Walker Records	
1996	99.75	Red Eye	Special Delivery to My Heart			Decomposition Records	
1996	100	Teen Idles	Anniversary				Recorded in 1980
1996	100.5	The Warmers	Thin Air			The Warmers	
1996	101	Bluetip	Dischord No. 101				
1996	101.5	Bluetip	Past Tense			Hellfire Records	
1996	102	The Warmers	The Warmers				
1996	102.5	Norman Mayer Group	Moody			Monumental Recordings	
1996	103	Fire Party	19 Songs				
1996	103.5	Sevens	12:12 / Enemy			Akashik Records	
1996	104	Trusty	The Fourth Wise Man				
1997	104.5	The Crownhate Ruin	Intermediate			T. C. Ruin	
1997	105	The Make-Up	After Dark				
1997	105.5	The Meta-Matics	The Meta-Matics			Slowdime records	
1997	106	Lungfish	Indivisible				
1997	106.5	Tone	Sustain			Independent Projects Records	
1997	107	Branch Manager	Anything Tribal				
1997	107.5	Regulator Watts	The Mercury EP			Slowdime Records	
1997	108	Autoclave	Combined				
1998	108.5	Corm	Audio Flame Kit			Shute Records	
1999	109	Happy Go Licky	Will Play				
1998	109.5	Mud	Train to Forever			Radiopaque Records	
1998	110	Fugazi	End Hits				
1998	110.5	The Capitol City Dusters	Forest Fire			Superbad Records	
1998	111	Bluetip	Dischord No. 111				
1998	111.5	Kerosene 454	Came By to Kill Me			Slowdime Records	
1997	112	Smart Went Crazy	Con Art				
1998	112.5	Norman Mayer Group	In Memory of Norman Mayer			Monumental Recordings	
1998	113	The Make-Up	In Mass Mind			Black Gemini Records	
1998	113.5	Regulator Watts	New Low Moline			Slowdime Records	
1998	114	The Make-Up	Blue Is Beautiful				
1998	114.4	Edsel	Edsel			Radiopaque Records	
1998	115	Lungfish	Artificial Horizon				
1998	115.5	The Monorchid	Let them Eat the Monorchid			Simple Machines	
1998	116	Bluetip	Join Us				
1999	116.5	Candy Machine	Tune International			DeSoto Records	
1999	117	Lungfish	The Unanimous Hour				
1999	117.5	Capitol City Dusters / The Most Secret Method	split			Superbad Records	
1999	118	One Last Wish	1986				
1999	118.5	All Scars	Early Ambient			Slowdime Records	
2000	119	Lungfish	Necrophones				
1999	119.5	Regulator Watts	The Aesthetics of No-Drag			Slowdime Records	
1999	120	Fugazi	Instrument Soundtrack				
1999	120.5	Stigmatics	2 Songs			Brickthrower Records	
2000	121	Bluetip	Polymer				
2000	121.5	Capitol City Dusters	Simplicity			Superbad Records	
2000	122	Faraquet	The View from this Tower				
2000	122.5	Machetres	Machetres			Brickthrower Records	
2000	123	Q and Not U	No Kill No Beep Beep				
2000	123.5	Q and Not U	Hot and Informed			DeSoto Records	
2000	124	Nation of Ulysses	The Embassy Tapes				
2000	124.5	Bald Rapunzel	Diazepam			Resin Records	
2002	125	Various Artists	20 Years of Dischord				
2008	125a	Various Artists	20 Years of Dischord: 14 Bonus Tracks 2000-2008				Extra tracks featuring newer Dischord bands
1999	125.5	Capitol City Dusters/Aina	Split			Superbad Records	
2001	126	Bluetip	P.M.A.				
2000	126.5	Tone	Structure			Brookland Records	
2002	127	Capitol City Dusters	Rock Creek				
2001	127.5	Edie Sedgwick	First Reflections			Mud Memory	
2002	128	El Guapo (Supersystem)	Super/System				
2001	128.5	Beauty Pill	The Cigarette Girl from the Future			DeSoto Records	
2001	129	Fugazi	Furniture				
2001	129.5	Cry Baby Cry	Jesus Loves Stacey			Skoda Records	
2001	130	Fugazi	The Argument				
2003	130 1/2	Tone	Ambient Metals			Brookland Records	
2003	131	Pupils	Pupils				
2003	131.5	All Scars	Lunar Magus				
2002	132	Q and Not U	On Play Patterns				
2003	132.5	Antelope	Antelope				
2002	133	Q and Not U	Different Damage				
2004	133.5	Routineers	11 Songs			Sammich Records	
2003	134	El Guapo (Supersystem)	Fake French				
2003	135	Black Eyes	Black Eyes				
2003	136	Various Artists	Radio CPR: Begin Live Transmission				
2003	137	Lungfish	Love Is Love				
2003	138	Beauty Pill	You Are Right to Be Afraid				
2004	139	Beauty Pill	The Unsustainable Lifestyle				
2003	140	Minor Threat	First Demo Tape				Recorded in 1981
2003	141	Q and Not U	2 Songs				
2004	142	Antelope	Crowns / The Flock				
2004	143	Q and Not U	Power				
2004	144	The Warmers	Wanted: More				
2004	145	Black Eyes	Cough				
2004	146	Medications	5 Songs				
2005	147	Lungfish	Feral Hymns				
2005	148	French Toast	In a Cave				
2005	149	Medications	Your Favorite People All in One Place				
2005	150	The Evens	12 Songs				
2006	151	Channels	Waiting for the Next End of the World				
2006	152	Soccer Team	'Volunteered' Civility and Professionalism				
2006	153	Joe Lally	There to Here				
2006	154	French Toast	Ingelside Terrace				
2006	155	The Aquarium	The Aquarium				
2006	156	The Make-Up	In Film/On Video				
2007	157	Antelope	Reflector				
2007	158	Joe Lally	Nothing Is Underrated				
2008	159	Faraquet	Anthology 1997-98				
2006	160	The Evens	Get Evens				
2007	160.5	Fast Piece of Furniture	Adventures in Contentment			Adult Swim Records	
2007	161	Edie Sedgwick	Things are Getting Sinister and Sinisterer				
2007	161.5	Deadline	8/2/82				
2009	162	Andalusians	Do the Work				
2009	163	Title Tracks	Every Little Bit Hurts				
2007	163.5	Rain	La Vache Qui Rit				
2009	164	Aquarium	Performer				
2010	165	Medications	Completely Removed				
2010	166	Government Issue	Boycott Stabb Complete Sessions				
2010	167	Artificial Peace	Complete Session, Nov '81				
2010	168	Dag Nasty	Dag with Shawn				
2011	168.5	Joe Lally	Why Should I Get Used to It			Tolotta Records	
2011	169	Edie Sedgwick	Love Gets Lovelier Every Day				
2011	170	The Evens	Two Songs				
2011	171	Void	Sessions 1981-83				
2011	172	Faith	Subject to Change Plus First Demo				
2011	173	Office of Future Plans	Office of Future Plans				
2012	174	Lungfish	ACR 1999				
2012	174.5	Alarms & Controls	Reanimus Cataract b/w Kirtland's Warbler			Mud Memory Records	
2012	175	E.D. Sedgwick	We Wear White				
2012	175.5	E.D. Sedgwick	Heatwave			Mud Memory Records	
2012	176	Rites of Spring	Six Song Demo				Recorded in 1986
2012	177	S.O.A	First Demo 12/29/80				
2012	178	Deathfix	S/T				
2012	179	Soulside	Trigger + Bass 103				
2012	180	The Evens	The Odds				
2013	180.5	Red Hare	Nites of Midnite			Hellfire	
2013	181.5	Alarms and Controls	Clovis Points			Lovitt Records	
2014	181	Fugazi	First Demo				
2013	181.5	Alarms and Controls	Clovis Points				
2015	182	Soccer Team	Real Lessons in Cynicism				
2015	183	Youth Brigade	Complete First Demo				
2015	183.5	Red Hare	Lexicon Mist			Hellfire	
2016	184	Dag Nasty	Cold Heart				
2016	184.5	Tone	Antares			TminusONEmusic	
2017	185	The Effects	Eyes to the Light				
2017	185.5	Red Hare	Little Acts of Destruction			Hellfire	
2018	186	The Messthetics	The Messthetics				
2019	187	J. Robbins	Un-becoming				
2019	188	Hammered Hulls	S/T				
2019	189	The Messthetics	Anthropocosmic Nest				
2020	190	Coriky	Coriky				
2020	191	Soulside	This Ship				
2023	191.5	The Delarcos	Irradiate			Punkish	
2022	192	Soulside	A Brief Moment In The Sun				
2022	193	Hammered Hulls	Careening				
2023	193.5	The Owners	S/T			Red Room	
2023	194	Scream	DC Special				
2023	194.5	Light Beams	Wild Life			Mud Memory	
2023	195	Minor Threat	Out Of Step Outtakes				
2024	196	J. Robbins	Basilisk				
2024	196.5	Sensor Ghost	3 Song 7"			Lovitt	
2024	197	Bed Maker	Bed Maker				
2024	197.5	Continuals	Continuals			Bright Future	
2025	198	Sensor Ghost	Irritation on Demand				
2024	198.5	Fidelity Jones	Magdeburg Lad				
2022	200	Various Artists	First Six Dischord Records				A reissue of the first six Dischord 7"s
2025	200.5	Light Beams	Emulate			Lovitt Records	
2025	201	Shudder To Think	Shudder To Think				
2025	201.5	The Owners	Monster EP			Red Rooms Records	
2026	202	Scream / Soulside	Plays				
2026	202.5	Light Beams	We Got Feelings			Electric Cowbell Records	Scheduled for release December 4, 2026.
2026	203	Bed Maker	The Mark				
2026	204	The Enzymes / Trenchmouth	The Enzymes / Trenchmouth Split				Scheduled for release December 4, 2026.

=== Northern Liberties ===
An imprint of Dischord formed to release projects that were interesting but didn't fit the Dischord label.

Year	Artist	Title	Cat. #
2003	Don Zientara	Sixteen Songs	nolib1
2004	Danel Higgs	Magic Alphabet	nolib2
2004	Et At It	I Count	nolib3
2004	Don Zientara	Clocks & Watches	nolib4
2009	Don Zientara	I Was Walking	nolib5
2014	Don Zientara	Eyes In the Back of My Head	nolib6
2023	Don Zientara	Waiting For the Tide	nolib7

== See also ==
- List of Dischord Records bands
