= Salad Days (2014 film) =

2014 documentary film by Scott Crawford

- Film poster
- Directed by: Scott Crawford
- Written by: Scott Crawford
- Produced by: Scott Crawford
- Starring: John Stabb, Ian MacKaye, Henry Rollins, Dave Grohl, Alec MacKaye, Fred Armisen and many more musicians, entertainment executives, etc.
- Music by: Michael Hampton
- Distributed by: MVD Entertainment Group
- Release date: December 19, 2014
- Running time: 103 min.
- Language: English

Salad Days: A Decade of Punk in Washington, DC (1980–90) is a documentary written and directed by Scott Crawford. Released on December 19, 2014, the Kickstarter-funded film features early pioneers of the Washington, DC hardcore punk music scene over a decade (1980–1990) including Minor Threat, Fugazi, Bad Brains, Government Issue, Youth Brigade, Teen Idles, Rites of Spring, and others.

== Synopsis ==
This documentary film addresses the growth and the social, cultural and political aspects that influenced the hardcore punk music scene in Washington, DC. The film features numerous footage shot and photos of the hardcore movement. It features interviews with early hardcore punk music artists from bands and many more.

== Interviewees ==
The interviewees are (in order of appearance):

- Ian Mackaye of Fugazi, formerly of The Teen Idles, Minor Threat and co-founder of Dischord Records
- Henry Rollins of Rollins Band, formerly of Black Flag and State of Alert
- Mark Sullivan formerly of Kingface
- Sab Grey of Iron Cross
- Bert Queiroz formerly of Untouchables, Youth Brigade and Second Wind
- Thurston Moore of Sonic Youth
- Alec MacKaye formerly of Untouchables, The Faith, and Ignition
- Dante Ferrando formerly of Iron Cross, Ignition and Gray Matter
- Danny Ingram formerly of Youth Brigade, Madhouse and Strange Boutique
- Nathan Strejcek formerly of The Teen Idles and Youth Brigade
- Skip Groff producer of Y&T Records and Limp Records
- Don Zientara producer of Inner Ear Studios
- Jeff Nelson formerly of The Teen Idles, Minor Threat, Three and co-founder of Dischord Records
- Cynthia Connolly photographer
- Kenny Inouye formerly of Marginal Man
- J Mascis of Dinosaur Jr., formerly of Deep Wound
- Jenny Toomey formerly of Tsunami, Grenadine and co-founder of Simple Machines Records
- Mark Robinson formerly of Unrest and founder of TeenBeat Records
- Scott Crawford filmmaker and journalist
- Bubba DuPree formerly of Void
- Jason Farrell of Swiz
- Dody DiSanto co-founder of 9:30 Club
- Fred Armisen actor, comedian and formerly of Trenchmouth
- Brian Baker of Bad Religion, formerly of Minor Threat and Dag Nasty
- John Stabb formerly of Government Issue
- Boyd Farrell formerly of Black Market Baby
- Mike Dolfi formerly of Black Market Baby
- George Pelecanos novelist and screenwriter
- Mark Haggerty formerly of Iron Cross and Gray Matter
- Michael Hampton formerly of State of Alert, The Faith, Embrace and One Last Wish
- Tom Berard scenester
- Nicole Thomas formerly of Fire Party
- Tom Sherwood reporter and author
- Jessica Kane scenester
- Andre "White Boy" Johnson of Rare Essence
- Bobby Sullivan formerly of Soulside and Lunchmeat
- Stuart Casson formerly of The Meatmen and Dove
- Tim Kerr formerly of Big Boys
- Steve Hansgen formerly of Minor Threat and Second Wind
- Steve Niles formerly of Gray Matter and Three
- Joey Aronstamm formerly of Holy Rollers
- Onam Ben-Israel (formerly Tomas Squip) formerly of Red C, Beefeater and Fidelity Jones
- Monica Richards formerly of Madhouse and Strange Boutique
- Sharon Cheslow formerly of Chalk Circle and BMO
- Amy Pickering formerly of Fire Party
- Mark Andersen author and activist
- Brendan Canty of Fugazi, formerly of Rites of Spring, One Last Wish and Happy Go Licky
- Skeeter Thompson formerly of Scream
- Tom Lyle formerly of Government Issue
- J. Robbins of Office of Future Plans, formerly of Government Issue and Jawbox
- Damon Locks formerly of Trenchmouth
- Jon Jolles scenester
- Jim Saah photographer and filmmaker
- Meghan Adkins formerly of Special K
- Geoff Turner formerly of Gray Matter
- Chris Thomson formerly of Lunchmeat and Ignition
- Scott McCloud formerly of Lunchmeat and Soulside
- Dave Grohl of Foo Fighters, formerly of Scream and Nirvana
- Chris Page formerly of Mission Impossible
- Pete Stahl formerly of Scream
- Franz Stahl formerly of Scream and Foo Fighters
- Steve Polcari formerly of Marginal Man and Artificial Peace
- Jim Spellman journalist and formerly of High Back Chairs and Velocity Girl
- Andy Rapoport formerly of Kingface
- Craig Wedren formerly of Shudder to Think
- Kim Coletta formerly of Jawbox
- Joe Lally of Fugazi

== Soundtrack ==
- Me and You - Egghunt
- What a Boy Can't Do - Slickee Boys
- Don't Bother Me - Bad Brains
- Kill the Kids - Slinkees
- Never Mind - White Boy
- Pressure's On - Red C
- Banned in DC - Bad Brains
- Nic Fit - Untouchables
- Its About Time We Had A Change - Youth Brigade
- Teen Idles - Teen Idles
- Teen Love - No Trend
- Public Defender - SOA
- Who Cares - Slinkees
- All Ages Show - Dag Nasty
- Gotta Tell Me Why - Slickee Boys
- Repulsion - Madhouse
- Death of a Friend - Double-O
- Teenage Rebel - The Avengers
- Suburban Wasteland - Artificial Peace
- Building - Embrace
- Bet You Never Thought - Scream
- Came Without Warning - Scream
- Baby - Soulside
- DC Groove - Static Disruptors
- Bang on the Drum - Scream
- Throttle - Ignition
- Flannery - Dain Bramage
- Crawl - Kingface
- Lie - Swiz
- Summertime Train - Shudder to Think
- Take it Back - Gray Matter
- Straight Edge - Minor Threat
- Who Are You - Void
- Torn Apart - Marginal Man
- Double Image - Marginal Man
- Forever Gone - Marginal Man
- Bulldog Front - Fugazi
- Waiting Room - Fugazi
- Into Your Shell - Mission Impossible
- Aware - Faith
- World at War - Black Market Baby
- Youth Crimes - Black Market Baby
- Caring Line - Government Issue
- Jaded Eyes - Government Issue
- Swann Street - 3
- Freezer Burn - Jawbox
- Funk Off - Big Boys
- Salad Days - Minor Threat
- I Could Puke - White Boy

== Bibliography ==
- Crawford, Scott (2017). Spoke: Anecdotes and Images from the Film Salad Days: A Decade of Punk in Washington, DC, 1980–1990. Akashic Books. ISBN 9781617755002.
