= List of Dischord Records bands =

The following is a list of bands, past and present, who have had recordings released on the Dischord Records label:

== Artists ==
- Alarms & Controls (2010–2015)
- Andalusians (2007-present)
- Antelope (2001–2008)
- The Aquarium (2001–2006)
- Artificial Peace (1981–1982)
- Autoclave (1990–1991)
- Beauty Pill (2000–present)
- Bed Maker (2019–present)
- Beefeater (1984–1986)
- Black Eyes (2001–2004)
- Bluetip (1995–2002)
- Branch Manager (1990–1997)
- Capitol City Dusters (1996–2003)
- Channels (2003–present)
- Circus Lupus (1990–1993)
- Coriky (2015-present)
- Crownhate Ruin (1994–1996)
- Dag Nasty (1985–1991)
- Deadline (1981–1982)
- Deathfix (2009–present)
- Double-O (1983) (Split release with R&B records)
- Edie Sedgwick (1999–present)
- Egg Hunt (1986)
- El Guapo (1996–2006)
- The EFFECTS (2014–present)
- Embrace (1985–1986)
- The Evens (2001–present)
- The Faith (1980–1983)
- Faraquet (1997–2001, 2007–2008)
- Fidelity Jones (1988–1990, 2023-present)
- Fire Party (1986–1990)
- French Toast (2001–2006)
- Fugazi (1987–2002; on a "hiatus of unknown length")
- Government Issue (1981–1989)
- Gray Matter (1983–1986; 1990–1993)
- Hammered Hulls (2018-present)
- Happy Go Licky (1987–1988)
- High Back Chairs (1989–1993)
- Holy Rollers (1989–1995)
- Hoover (1992–1994; reformed briefly in 1997 and again in 2004)
- Ignition (1986–1989)
- Iron Cross (1981–1985)
- Jawbox (1989–1997, first Dischord band to leave for major label in 1993)
- J. Robbins (2018-present)
- Joe Lally
- Lungfish (1988–present)
- The Make-Up (1995–2000)
- Marginal Man (1982–1988)
- Medications (2003–present)
- The Messthetics (2016–present)
- Minor Threat (1980–1983)
- Nation of Ulysses (1988–1992)
- Office of Future Plans (2009–2016)
- One Last Wish (1986)
- The Pupils (2000–present)
- Q and Not U (1998–2005)
- Red C (1981)
- Reptile House (1985)
- Rites of Spring (1984–1986)
- Scream (1981–1990)
- Severin (1989–1993)
- Shudder to Think (1986–1998)
- Skewbald/Grand Union (1981)
- Slant 6 (1992–1995)
- Smart Went Crazy (1993–1998)
- Soccer Team (2006–present)
- Soulside (1986–1989)
- State of Alert (SOA) (1980–1981)
- Teen Idles (1979–1980)
- Title Tracks (2008-2017)
- Three (1986–1988)
- Trusty (1989–1997)
- Untouchables (1979–1981)
- Void (1980–1983)
- The Warmers (1994–1997)
- Youth Brigade (1981)

== See also ==
- Dischord Records discography
