= 20 Years of Dischord =

2002 box set album

Box set by various artists
- Released: October 1, 2002
- Recorded: 1980–2000
- Studio: Inner Ear
- Genre: Hardcore punk; punk rock; post-hardcore
- Length: 3:11:15
- Label: Dischord
- Producer: Don Zientara; Guillaume Bernardeau; Chris Mills

Professional ratings
Review scores
Source	Rating
AllMusic	4.5/5 stars

20 Years of Dischord is a three-disc box set compiled by D.C.-based record label Dischord Records to commemorate its 20th anniversary.

== Overview ==
20 Years of Dischord is a concise but representative musical chronicle of the first two decades of the label originally created by Ian MacKaye and Jeff Nelson as teenagers in 1980 with the sole purpose of releasing Minor Disturbance, their band, the Teen Idles, debut EP; but that, over time, it went on to document the most part of the music coming out of the U.S. capital city's underground community, becoming highly influential.

The core of the collection are the first two discs, packaged together into a single CD case under the title Fifty Bands, which contains 50 songs, one track from each band that appeared on the label from 1980 to 2000, all of them previously released, featured in roughly chronological order, showing the musical evolution of the scene.

"...the fascinating part [of 20 Years of Dischord] is hearing the progression ... from a high-octane hardcore hotbed to a more arty, experimental, and wide-ranging purely musical scene..."

— Chris True, reviewer at AllMusic

The third disc, an enhanced CD titled Unreleased and Rare, consists of a variety of outtakes, demos and live recordings from the Dischord vaults, also includes an early interview with MacKaye, as well as some video files of archival footage featuring performances by the Teen Idles, Untouchables, State of Alert, the Faith, Void, and Deadline. The songs that make up the disc were also released separately, as a collection, and individually, as downloadables digital audio files.

The box set includes a profusely illustrated 134-page book titled Putting DC on the Map. Introduced by MacKaye, Nelson and Henry Rollins, the booklet contains a brief historic review of the label, a profile of each of the bands featured on the compilation, and a pictorial discography.

== Production and release ==
Conceived by Ian MacKaye and Jeff Nelson, the 20 Years of Dischord box set was edited by Don Zientara at Inner Ear Studios in Arlington, Virginia. Chad Clark was in charge of the audio mastering at Silver Sonya Recording and Mastering, also located in Arlington. The video files on the enhanced CD were edited by Chris Mills and Guillaume Bernardeau at the studio of RHED Pixel, located outside of Washington, D.C.

Dischord Records released the collection on October 1, 2002. (Note: Dischord #DIS 125)

== 14 Bonus Tracks 2000–2008 ==
14 Bonus Tracks 2000-2008

Compilation album by various artists
- Released: 2008
- Genre: Punk rock
- Label: Dischord Records

In November 2008, 20 Years of Dischord was updated with an additional compilation titled 14 Bonus Tracks 2000–2008, (Note: Dischord #DIS 125a) featuring songs, all of them previously released, from 14 bands who have had releases on the label since 2000 through 2008. Available only in MP3 format through digital download, this bonus collection has been sold separately or offered for free with the purchase of the original box set.

== Track listings ==
=== Fifty Bands ===
Disc 1
No.	Title	Writer(s)	Artist/Original release	Length
1.	"Get Up and Go"	Ian MacKaye, The Teen Idles	The Teen Idles; Minor Disturbance, EP (1980)	0:52
2.	"Nic Fit"	Alec MacKaye	Untouchables; Flex Your Head (1982)	1:00
3.	"Public Defender"	Henry Garfield, Michael Hampton	State of Alert; No Policy, EP (1981)	1:11
4.	"Screaming at a Wall"	I. MacKaye	Minor Threat; Minor Threat, EP (1981)	1:39
5.	"Dehumanized"	John Weiffenbach	Void; Flex Your Head (1982)	1:15
6.	"Barbed Wire"		Youth Brigade; Possible, EP (1981)	1:41
7.	"Rock & Roll Bullshit"	Government Issue	Government Issue; Legless Bull, EP (1981)	1:13
8.	"Fight/American Justice"	Scream	Scream; Still Screaming (1983)	3:44
9.	"Live for Now"	Dante Ferrando	Iron Cross; Flex Your Head (1982)	2:06
10.	"Pressure's On"	Peter Murray	Red C Flex Your Head (1982)	1:48
11.	"Stolen Youth"	Ray Hare, Brendan Canty	Deadline; Flex Your Head (1982)	1:43
12.	"Suburban Wasteland"	Steve Polcari	Artificial Peace; Flex Your Head (1982)	1:53
13.	"Subject to Change"	The Faith	The Faith; Subject to Change, EP (1983)	1:34
14.	"Sorry/Change for the Same"	Skewbald	Skewbald/Grand Union; Skewbald/Grand Union, EP (1991)	2:50
15.	"Missing Rungs"	Marginal Man	Marginal Man; Identity (1984)	2:00
16.	"Oscar's Eye"	Gray Matter	Gray Matter; Food for Thought (1985)	2:53
17.	"Drink Deep"	Rites of Spring	Rites of Spring; Rites of Spring (1985)	4:55
18.	"Just Things"	Beefeater	Beefeater; House Burning Down (1987)	3:27
19.	"Snake Rap"	The Snakes	The Snakes; I Won't Love You 'Til You're More Like Me (1985)	2:41
20.	"Circles"	Dag Nasty	Dag Nasty; Can I Say (1986)	2:46
21.	"Money"	Embrace	Embrace; Embrace (1987)	2:39
22.	"Punch the Geek"		Soulside; Hot Bodi-Gram (1989)	2:24
23.	"We All Fall Down"	I. MacKaye	Egg Hunt "Me and You", single (1986)	2:47
24.	"This Time"		One Last Wish; 1986 (1999)	2:00
25.	"Cake"	Fire Party	Fire Party; Fire Party, EP (1988)	3:36
26.	"Rebuilding"	Ignition	Ignition; Ignition, 7-inch EP (1987)	2:25
27.	"Domino Days"	3	Three; Dark Days Coming (1989)	2:50
28.	"Red House"	Shudder to Think	Shudder to Think; Funeral at the Movies (1991)	3:32
29.	"Twist and Shout" (live, 1987)		Happy Go Licky; Will Play (1997)	4:38

Disc 2
No.	Title	Writer(s)	Artist	Length
1.	"Blueprint"	Fugazi	Fugazi; Repeater (1990)	3:51
2.	"Friend to Friend in Endtime"	Lungfish	Lungfish; Talking Songs for Walking (1992)	3:53
3.	"Destructor"		Fidelity Jones "Venus on Lovely", single (1990)	3:42
4.	"Spectra Sonic Sound"	The Nation of Ulysses	The Nation of Ulysses; 13-Point Program to Destroy America (1991)	2:28
5.	"Perfect Sleeper"		Holy Rollers; Fabuley (1991)	3:51
6.	"Motorist"	Jawbox	Jawbox "Jackpot Plus!", single (1993)	3:53
7.	"People Are Wrong"	Severin	Severin; Acid to Ashes and Rust to Dust (1992)	4:17
8.	"Summer"		High Back Chairs; Curiosity & Relief, EP (1992)	2:50
9.	"I'll Take You Down"		Autoclave "Go Far", single (1991)	3:27
10.	"Pop Man"	Circus Lupus	Circus Lupus; Circus Lupus, single (1992)	3:27
11.	"Mr. Weekend"		Branch Manager; Anything Tribal (1997)	4:13
12.	"What Kind of Monster Are You?"	Slant 6	Slant 6 "What Kind of Monster Are You?", single (1993)	2:02
13.	"Cable"	Hoover	Hoover "Side Car Freddie", single (1992)	3:51
14.	"Goodbye, Dr. Fate"		Trusty; Goodbye, Dr. Fate (1995)	2:05
15.	"A Good Day"	Chad Clark, Smart Went Crazy	Smart Went Crazy; Con Art (1997)	5:52
16.	"Piss Alley"		The Crownhate Ruin; Until the Eagle Grins (1996)	5:27
17.	"Poked It With a Stick"	Juan Luis Carrera, Amy Farina, A. MacKaye	The Warmers; The Warmers (1996)	2:45
18.	"They Live by Night"	The Make-Up	Make-Up; Destination: Love – Live! at Cold Rice (1996)	2:07
19.	"Castanet"	Jason Farrell, Bluetip	Bluetip; Join Us (1998)	3:37
20.	"Cut Self Not"		Faraquet; The View from This Tower (2000)	2:53
21.	"Hooray for Humans"	Q and Not U	Q and Not U No Kill No Beep Beep (2000)	3:08

=== Unreleased and Rare ===
Enhanced CD containing additional video files.

Disc 3
No.	Title	Writer(s)	Artist	Length
1.	"Get Up and Go"	The Teen Idles	The Teen Idles	1:27
2.	"Deadhead"	The Teen Idles	The Teen Idles	1:42
3.	"Stepping Stone" (Boyce and Hart cover)	Tommy Boyce, Bobby Hart	Untouchables	2:12
4.	"Draw Blank"	State of Alert	State of Alert	0:39
5.	"Straight Edge" (live)	I. MacKaye, Minor Threat	Minor Threat	1:10
6.	"Understand"	Minor Threat	Minor Threat	1:55
7.	"Snubbing"	Government Issue	Government Issue	0:59
8.	"Asshole" (feat. Ian MacKaye on vocals)	Government Issue	Government Issue	1:09
9.	"Asshole Dub"	Minor Threat	Minor Threat	3:33
10.	"I Object"		Youth Brigade	0:30
11.	"Rozzlyn Rangers"		Rozzlyn Rangers	1:51
12.	"Black, Jewish and Poor"		Void	1:08
13.	"Authority" (takes 1 and 2)		Void	1:23
14.	"Search for Employment"		Scream	2:04
15.	"No Revolution"		Deadline	0:49
16.	"No Choice"		The Faith	0:55
17.	"Manipulator"	Marginal Man	Marginal Man	2:28
18.	"All Ages Show" (rare)	Dag Nasty	Dag Nasty	2:39
19.	"The Word"	Fugazi	Fugazi	4:19
20.	"Burning" (live)	Fugazi	Fugazi	3:07
21.	"Drop Dead Don't Blink"	Shudder to Think	Shudder to Think	3:10
22.	"We Are the One" (rare)	Avengers	Circus Lupus	3:26
23.	"Are You Human?"	Slant 6	Slant 6	3:31
24.	"Interview" (spoken word)	Don Fleming, Malcolm Riviera	Ian MacKaye et al.	1:28
Total length:				3:11:15

Videos
No.	Title	Artist	Length
1.	"Outside the Law"	Deadline	2:03
2.	"You're X'd"	The Faith	1:15
3.	"Draw Blank"	State of Alert	0:42
4.	"Untitled"	The Teen Idles	1:48
5.	"If the Kids Are United"	Untouchables	3:09
6.	"Who Are You"	Void	2:20
Total length:			11:17

=== 14 Bonus Tracks 2000–2008 ===
Digital collection released in 2008 as an update of the original compilation.

No.	Title	Artist	Length
1.	"Not Me Now"	Capitol City Dusters	4:11
2.	"Just Don't Know"	El Guapo	3:15
3.	"Prison Song"	Beauty Pill	3:10
4.	"Sissy Spacek"	Edie Sedgwick	2:51
5.	"It's Good to Have Met You"	The Pupils	3:21
6.	"Speaking in Tongues"	Black Eyes	3:10
7.	"Around the Corner"	The Evens	3:25
8.	"The Perfect Target"	Medications	4:02
9.	"White House"	Aquarium	2:13
10.	"Reflector"	Antelope	3:43
11.	"Off Center"	French Toast	2:52
12.	"Licensee"	Channels	3:17
13.	"Via Nomentana"	Joe Lally	2:40
14.	"Solid Ring Fighters"	Soccer Team	3:05
Total length:			45:15

== Personnel ==
These were the lineups for each of the fifty songs featured on discs 1 and 2.

The Teen Idles (1979–80)

- Nathan Strejcek – vocals
- Geordie Grindle – guitar
- Ian MacKaye – bass
- Jeff Nelson – drums

Untouchables (1979–81)

- Alec MacKaye – vocals
- Eddie Janney – guitar
- Bert Queiroz – bass
- Richard Moore – drums

State of Alert (S.O.A.) (1980–81)

- Henry Garfield (later known as Henry Rollins) – vocals
- Michael Hampton – guitar
- Wendel Blow – bass
- Simon Jacobsen – drums

Minor Threat (1980–83)

- Ian MacKaye – vocals
- Lyle Preslar – guitar
- Brian Baker – bass
- Jeff Nelson – drums

Void (1980–83)

- John Weiffenbach – vocals
- Jon "Bubba" Dupree – guitar
- Chris Stover – bass
- Sean Finnegan – drums

Youth Brigade (1980–81)

- Nathan Strejcek – vocals
- Tom Clinton – guitar
- Bert Queiroz – bass
- Danny Ingram – drums

Government Issue (1980–89)

- John Stabb – vocals
- John Barry – guitar
- Brian Gay – bass
- Mark Alberstadt – drums

Scream (1981–90)

- Pete Stahl – vocals
- Franz Stahl – guitar
- Skeeter Thompson – bass
- Kent Stax – drums

Iron Cross (1981–85)

- Sab Grey – vocals
- Mark Haggerty – guitar
- Wendel Blow – bass
- Dante Ferrando – drums

Red C (1981)

- Eric Lagdameo – vocals
- Pete Murray – guitar
- Toni Young – bass
- Tomas Squip – drums

Deadline (1981–82)

- Ray Hare – vocals
- Chris Caron – guitar
- Terry Scanlon – bass
- Brendan Canty – drums

Artificial Peace (1980–81)

- Steve Polcari – vocals
- Pete Murray – guitar
- Rob Moss – bass
- Mike Manos – drums

The Faith (1981–83)

- Alec MacKaye – vocals
- Michael Hampton – guitar
- Eddie Janney – guitar
- Chris Bald – bass
- Ivor Hanson – drums

Skewbald/Grand Union (1981–82)

- Ian MacKaye – vocals
- Eddie Janney – guitar
- John Falls – bass
- Jeff Nelson – drums

Marginal Man (1982–88)

- Steve Polcari – vocals
- Pete Murray – guitar
- Kenny Inouye – guitar
- Andre Lee – bass
- Mike Manos – drums

Gray Matter (1983–86, 1990–93)

- Geoff Turner – vocals, guitar
- Mark Haggerty – guitar
- Steve Niles – bass
- Dante Ferrando – drums

Rites of Spring (1984–86)

- Guy Picciotto – vocals, guitar
- Eddie Janney – guitar
- Michael Fellows – bass
- Brendan Canty – drums

Beefeater (1984–86)

- Tomas Squip – vocals
- Fred Smith – guitar
- Dug E. Bird – bass
- Kenny Craun – drums

The Snakes (1982–90)

- Simon Jacobsen – vocals, guitar, bass, keyboards
- Michael Hampton – vocals, drums, keyboards, guitar, bass

Dag Nasty (1985–91)

- Dave Smalley – vocals
- Brian Baker – guitar
- Roger Marbury – bass
- Colin Sears – drums

Embrace (1985–86)

- Ian MacKaye – vocals
- Michael Hampton – guitar
- Chris Bald – bass
- Ivor Hanson – drums

Soulside (1986–89)

- Bobby Sullivan – vocals
- Scott McCloud – guitar
- Johnny Temple – bass
- Alexis Fleisig – drums

Egg Hunt (1986)

- Ian MacKaye – vocals, guitar, bass
- Jeff Nelson – drums, backing vocals

One Last Wish (1986–87)

- Guy Picciotto – vocals
- Michael Hampton – guitar
- Eddie Janney – bass
- Brendan Canty – drums

Fire Party (1986–90)

- Amy Pickering – vocals
- Natalie Avery – guitar
- Kate Samworth – bass
- Nicky Thomas – drums

Ignition (1986–89)

- Alec MacKaye – vocals
- Chris Bald – guitar
- Chris Thomson – bass
- Dante Ferrando – drums

Three (1986–88)

- Geoff Turner – vocals, guitar
- Mark Haggerty – guitar
- Steve Niles – bass
- Jeff Nelson – drums

Shudder to Think (1986–98)

- Craig Wedren – vocals
- Chris Matthews – guitar
- Stuart Hill – bass
- Mike Russell – drums

Happy Go Licky (1987–88)

- Guy Picciotto – vocals, guitar
- Eddie Janney – guitar, vocals, tape loops
- Michael Fellows – bass, vocals
- Brendan Canty – drums

Fugazi (1987-)

- Ian MacKaye – vocals, guitar
- Guy Picciotto – vocals, guitar
- Joe Lally – bass
- Brendan Canty – drums

Lungfish (1987-)

- Daniel Higgs – vocals
- Asa Osborne – guitar
- John Chriest – bass
- Mitchell Feldstein – drums

Fidelity Jones (1988–90)

- Tomas Squip Jones – vocals
- Andy Charneco – guitar
- Dug E. Bird – bass
- Jerry Busher – drums

The Nation of Ulysses (1988–92)

- Ian Svenonius – vocals, trumpet
- Tim Green – guitar
- Steve Kroner – guitar
- Steve Gamboa – bass
- James Canty – drums

Holy Rollers (1989–95)

- Marc Lambiotte – vocals, guitar
- Joe Aronstamn – bass, vocals
- Maria Jones – drums, vocals
- Ian MacKaye – additional vocals
- Amy Pickering – additional vocals, tambourine

Jawbox (1989–97)

- J. Robbins – vocals, guitar
- Bill Barbot – guitar, vocals
- Kim Coletta – bass
- Zachary Barocas – drums

Severin (1989–93)

- Alec Bourgeois – vocals, guitar
- Mark Haggerty – guitar
- Eugene Bogan – bass, bagpipes
- Alex Daniels – drums

High Back Chairs (1989–93)

- Peter Hayes – vocals, guitar
- Jim Spellman – guitar
- Charles Steck – bass
- Jeff Nelson – drums

Autoclave (1990–91)

- Christina Billotte – vocals, bass
- Mary Timony – guitar, vocals
- Nikki Chapman – guitar
- Melissa Berkoff – drums

Circus Lupus (1990–93)

- Chris Thomson – vocals
- Chris Hamley – guitar
- Seth Lorinczi – bass, additional vocals
- Arika Casebolt – drums
- Joan Jett – additional vocals
- Amy Pickering – additional vocals

Branch Manager (1990–97)

- Ron Winters – vocals, guitar
- Dave Allen – bass
- Derrick Decker – drums

Slant 6 (1992–95)

- Christina Billotte – vocals, guitar
- Myra Power – bass, vocals
- Marge Marshall – drums

Hoover (1992–94)

- Joseph McRedmond – guitar, vocals
- Alexander T. Dunham – guitar, vocals
- Frederick Erskine – bass, vocals
- Christopher Farrall – drums

Trusty (1989–97)

- Bobby Matthews – vocals, guitar
- James Brady – guitar
- Brad Long – bass
- Jim Schaffer – drums

Smart Went Crazy (1993–98)

- Chad Clark – vocals, guitar
- Jeff Boswell – guitar
- Abram Goodrich – bass
- Hilary Soldati – cello
- Devin Ocampo – drums

The Crownhate Ruin (1994–96)

- Joseph McRedmond – vocals, guitar
- Frederick Erskine – vocals, bass
- Vin Novara – drums

The Warmers (1994–97)

- Alec MacKaye – guitar, vocals
- Juan Luis Carrera – bass, vocals
- Amy Farina – drums

Make-Up (1995–2000)

- Ian Svenonius – vocals
- James Canty – guitar, organ
- Michelle Mae – bass
- Steve Gamboa – drums

Bluetip (1995–2002)

- Jason Farrell – vocals, guitar
- Dave Stern – guitar
- Jake Kump – bass
- Dave Bryson – drums

Faraquet (1997–2001)

- Devin Ocampo – guitar, vocals
- Jeff Boswell – bass
- Chad Molter – drums

Q and Not U (1998–2005)

- Chris Richards – guitar, vocals
- Harris Klahr – guitar, vocals
- Matt Borlik – bass
- John Davis – drums

Production (box set)

- Don Zientara – editing (audio)
- Guillaume Bernardeau – editing (video)
- Chris Mills – editing (video)
- Chad Clark – audio mastering
- Jeff Nelson – graphic design, liner notes
- Michaele Fussell – artwork (graphic production)
- Ian MacKaye – liner notes
- Henry Rollins – liner notes
