= Rozzlyn Rangers =

Rozzlyn Rangers was the name taken by the 5 original members of the Dischord House in Arlington, Virginia (fairly near Rosslyn, Virginia) in October 1981: Ian MacKaye, Jeff Nelson, Rich Moore, Eddie Janney, and Sab Grey. Dischord House housed Dischord Records (founded a year earlier by The Teen Idles, shortly thereafter to be run by Ian MacKaye and Jeff Nelson). Despite its terribly low ceiling, many DC punk bands practiced in its basement over the years: Minor Threat, Skewbald, Iron Cross, The Faith, Second Wind, Rites of Spring, Embrace, Three, Fugazi, Beefeater, Fidelity Jones, Happy Go Licky, Kingface, One Last Wish, The Evens.

The Rozzlyn Rangers wrote and recorded their theme song ("Rozzlyn Rangers") in short order. It remained rare and unreleased until Dischord Records released their 20 Years of Dischord box set in 2004, which contained the song on the set's disc of rarities and unreleased tracks.
