= Revolution Summer (music) =

Punk music scene in Washington, D.C. in 1985

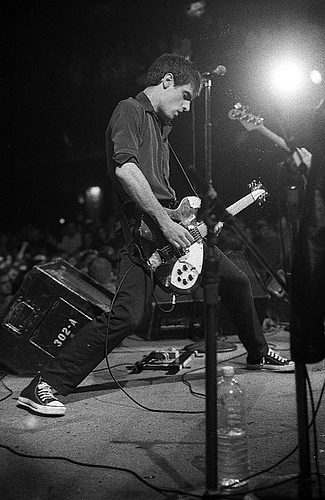
- Guy Picciotto fronted Revolution Summer bands Rites of Spring and One Last Wish
- Branch: Washington, D.C., hardcore
- Years active: 1984–1986
- Location: Washington, D.C.
- Major figures: Amy Pickering; Rites of Spring, Embrace; Beefeater
- Influences: Post-hardcore; hardcore punk; post-punk
- Influenced: Emo

Revolution Summer was a movement within the Washington, D.C., hardcore scene that took place between 1984 and 1986. Conceptualised and named by Amy Pickering while working at Dischord Records in the early 1980s, it placed an emphasis on hardcore punk bands pursuing more experimental avenues musically, and deconstructing the scene's perceived toxic masculinity. Spin referred to it as "a conscious, caring rebellion against the violent, impersonal turn the punk scene had taken." Bands in the movement, such as Beefeater and Egg Hunt were early pioneers of the post-hardcore genre, while Rites of Spring, Embrace, and Gray Matter were amongst the first emo bands.

== Background ==
There was a situation where the shows were becoming increasingly, moronically violent, and a lot of people were like: 'fuck it, I'll drop out, I don't want to be a part of this any more.

— Ian MacKaye of Minor Threat and Fugazi, as quoted by The Guardian (November 27, 2012)

From the late 1970s through the early 1980s, Washington, DC had a thriving hardcore punk community. The short-lived scene was one of the most influential in the United States. Bad Brains were an early influence on the speed of hardcore punk, and straight edge came to fruition in the wake of Minor Threat, whose frontman Ian MacKaye owned Dischord Records. By 1984, the scene was awash in violence: racist skinheads came to hardcore punk concerts in the city to fight; shows devolved into vandalism; and many participants in the scene developed an ethos of toxic masculinity.

When the Faith (with Alec MacKaye) put out the EP Subject to Change in 1983, it marked a critical evolution in the sound of D.C. hardcore and punk music in general. AllMusic writer Steve Huey described their music as "hint[ing] at what was to come, softening the standard-issue hardcore approach somewhat with better-developed melodies and a more inward-looking perspective".

== Conceptualisation ==
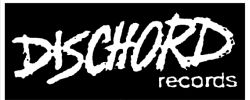
Revolution Summer was conceptualised by Amy Pickering while working at Dischord Records

In the early 1980s, Amy Pickering was hired by Dischord Records, where, on her first day of work, she tore down a sign that said "No Skirts Allowed". Due to her perceived transgressions of the scene, Pickering proposed a concept to a number of musicians, which would entail a "re-birthing" of D.C. hardcore in the following years.

The tight-knit community around Dischord Records, who helped establish the original scene, decided to leave it and create a new music scene in the city. It was envisioned to be more aware of the sexism of the traditional punk scene, embrace animal rights and vegetarianism, and oppose moshing and violence at concerts. Ultimately, it was an attempt to "rid punk of its machismo." Women like Pickering and Sharon Cheslow (of Chalk Circle and Bloody Mannequin Orchestra) spoke out about the need for women to feel more included, so they wouldn't distance themselves from the scene. John Stabb (of Government Issue) wrote an editorial for a local zine asking, "Do you want a football game or a show?" Mark Andersen (co-founder of Positive Force in D.C.) wrote for a local zine that people needed to look within to make changes.

== Political activism ==
While working at the Neighborhood Planning Council office as part of Marion Barry's summer jobs program in the summer of 1985, Pickering began mailing Xeroxed fliers emblazoned with the slogan: "Be on your toes. This is Revolution Summer." Tomas Squip (of Beefeater, later known as Oman Emmet) named Pickering as "the mother of the revolution" and credited Pickering with "setting a season into motion."

On June 14, 1985, Rites of Spring played a show at the Chevy Chase Community Center. At the show, the band announced a "Punk Percussion Protest" which would be held outside the South African Embassy in protest of apartheid on June 21. The show marked an important turning point towards the fruition of Revolution Summer, with one reviewer commenting, "The feeling in the hall was incredible, it was no different than the way it was in ‘81 or ‘82. Back then it was like change in the air or something, that’s what it was like at this show too."

On June 21, several punks participated in the first "Punk Percussion Protest" outside the South African Embassy. Standing across the street from other protestors, the punks loudly beat their drums, in "a very effective form of protest," said Mark Sullivan, a member of the band Kingface. "You have to protest a block and a half away from the Embassy," he explained, so "When we go down there and everybody is marching around beating on drums or whatever to make noise, you can hear it 3 or 4 miles away which means they can hear it inside the Embassy.” The punk percussion protests would become a mainstay of D.C. punks' activism.

That evening, Rites of Spring played a show at 9:30 Club, during which singer Guy Picciotto thanked the audience for attending the protest.

== Music ==
Revolution Summer was led by bands associated with Dischord Records. According to the Dischord website: "The violence and nihilism that had become identified with punk rock, largely by the media, had begun to take hold in DC and many of the older punks suddenly found themselves repelled and discouraged by their hometown scene," leading to "a time of redefinition." During these years, a new wave of bands started to form, including Rites of Spring, Lunchmeat (later to become Soulside), Gray Matter, Mission Impossible (with Dave Grohl who later joined Scream), Beefeater, Fire Party (featuring Pickering) and Embrace (with Ian MacKaye and members of the Faith).

The idea of "revolution" in the DC punk scene had been sparked in 1984 around the time Bloody Mannequin Orchestra (BMO) released their debut LP titled Roadmap to Revolution on WGNS, a label started by Geoff Turner (Gray Matter) and Colin Sears (BMO, later Dag Nasty). In a review of the LP for MRR, Ruth Schwartz wrote that the unique "hard-edged" and "art-damaged" music utilized different instruments and styles, and featured "eclectic lyrics that parody soldiers, heads of state, and people that think they're cool." Rites of Spring, described as the band that "more than led the change," challenged the "macho posturing that had become so prevalent within the punk scene at that point" and defied musical and stylistic rules. Journalist Steve Huey wrote that while Rites of Spring "strayed from hardcore's typically external concerns of the time – namely, social and political dissent – their musical attack was no less blistering, and in fact a good deal more challenging and nuanced than the average three-chord speed-blur", a sound that, according to Huey, mapped out "a new direction for hardcore that built on the innovations" brought by Hüsker Dü's Zen Arcade. Some other bands took inspiration from a broader range of genres such as funk (in the case of Beefeater) and 1960s pop (such as the example of Gray Matter).

According to Eric Grubbs, a nickname was developed for the new sound, with some considering it "post-hardcore", but another name that floated around the scene was "emo-core". The latter, mentioned in skateboarding magazine Thrasher, would come up in discussions around the D.C. area. While some of these bands have been considered contributors to the birth of emo, with Rites of Spring sometimes being named as the first or one of the earliest emo acts, musicians such as the band's former frontman Guy Picciotto and MacKaye himself have voiced their opposition against the term.

Revolution Summer lasted only a few months, and by 1986, most of emo's major bands (including Rites of Spring, Embrace, Gray Matter and Beefeater) had broken up. However, its ideas and aesthetics spread quickly across the country through a network of homemade zines, vinyl records and hearsay. According to Andy Greenwald, the Washington, D.C., scene laid the groundwork for emo's subsequent incarnations:

What had happened in D.C. in the mid-eighties—the shift from anger to action, from extroverted rage to internal turmoil, from an individualized mass to a mass of individuals—was in many ways a test case for the transformation of the national punk scene over the next two decades. The imagery, the power of the music, the way people responded to it, and the way the bands burned out instead of fading away—all have their origins in those first few performances by Rites of Spring. The roots of emo were laid, however unintentionally, by fifty or so people in the nation's capital. And in some ways, it was never as good and surely never as pure again. Certainly, the Washington scene was the only time "emocore" had any consensus definition as a genre.

== See also ==
- Positive Force DC
- Youth crew
- Second Summer of Love
- Great Peace March for Global Nuclear Disarmament
- Fashioncore
- Positive hardcore
