= Edward Janney =

- Genres: Hardcore punk; punk rock; post-hardcore; emo
- Occupations: Musician, producer, artist
- Instrument: Guitar
- Years active: 1979—1999; 2006—2007
- Labels: Dischord; Peterbilt; K
- Formerly of: Untouchables; the Faith; Rites of Spring; One Last Wish; Happy Go Licky; Skewbald/Grand Union; Brief Weeds

Edward Janney is an American musician, producer and artist who has played guitar for many Washington, D.C.–based hardcore punk bands such as Untouchables, the Faith, Rites of Spring, One Last Wish, Happy Go Licky, Skewbald/Grand Union and Brief Weeds, as well as having produced albums for Scream and Embrace and created album covers for Funeral Oration, Monorchid, Rites of Spring and Happy Go Licky. His brother is fellow musician Eli Janney.

== Discography ==
=== As a musician ===
Studio albums

Title	Album details
Faith/Void Split	Released:1982; Artist: The Faith
Rites of Spring	Released: 1985; Artist: Rites of Spring

EPs

Title	Album details
Subject to Change	Released: 1983; Artist: The Faith
All Through a Life	Released: 1987; Artist: Rites of Spring
Skewbald/Grand Union	Released: 1991; Artist: Skewbald/Grand Union
A Very Generous Portrait	Released: 1991; Artist: Brief Weeds
Songs Of Innocence And Experience	Released: 1993; Artist: Brief Weeds

Compilations

Title	Album details
Happy Go Licky	Released: 1988; Artist: Happy Go Licky
End on End	Released: 1991; Artist: Rites of Spring
Will Play	Released: 1997; Artist: Happy Go Licky
1986	Released: 1999; Artist: One Last Wish

Guest appearances

Title	Album details
Provisional	Released: 1989; Artist: Fugazi; Released on: Margin Walker
Sugar	Released: 1989; Artist: Carnival of Souls; Released on: Flop
I Hate You	Released: 1997; Artist: Total Fury; Released on: Spring Thrash E.P
There to Here	Released: 2006; Artist: Joe Lally
Nothing Is Underrated	Released: 2007; Artist: Joe Lally

=== As a producer ===
Title	Album details
Still Screaming	Released: 1983; Artist: Scream
Embrace	Released: 1987; Artist: Embrace
