= Washington, D.C., hardcore =

Hardcore punk scene of Washington, D.C.

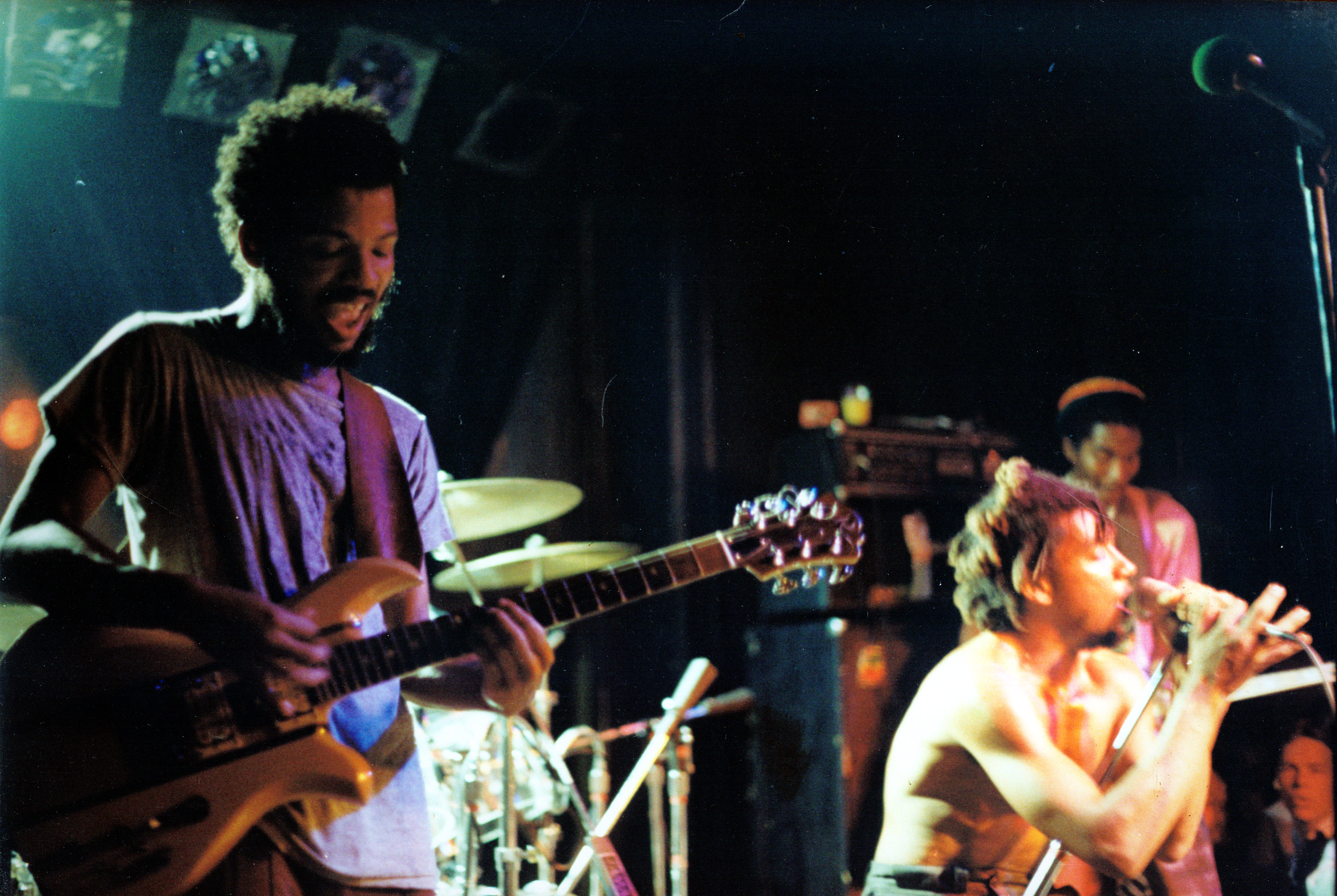
Washington, D.C., band Bad Brains

Washington, D.C., hardcore, commonly referred to as D.C. hardcore, sometimes styled in writing as harDCore, is the hardcore punk scene of Washington, D.C. Emerging in late 1979, it is considered one of the first and most influential punk scenes in the United States.

== History ==
Punk in Washington, D.C., found its origins in the district's former centers of 1960s counterculture. Georgetown University became a key location due to its heavy student population and student radio station, WGTB. The station was run under little supervision from the university administration, and therefore became a voice in the early 1970s for cultural radicalism that had faded since the end of the 1960s. Dupont Circle, becoming more known for its diverse and LGBT-inclusive community, also became important, as well as socially-restless Adams Morgan.

Washington, D.C., first saw touring punk bands such as the Ramones in 1976. D.C.'s punk scene emerged that year with groups like the Slickee Boys and Overkill, who were soon joined by the Look, the Controls, the Razz, White Boy, Urban Verbs, the Shirkers, the Penetrators, Tru Fax and the Insaniacs, and others. Limp Records, run by record producer and record store owner Skip Groff, released several of the earliest D.C. punk singles, as well as the compilation, :30 Over Washington, all of which helped lay the foundation for the larger scene to come. Also crucial to the scene was the founding of Inner Ear Studios by recording engineer Don Zientara. The studio would soon produce records for both the Look and Urban Verbs.

The Atlantis, located in the rear room of the Atlantic Building's ground floor at 930 F Street NW, was a short-lived venue, but was significant in the development of the punk scene. The first D.C. venue to host primarily punk and new wave bands, the Atlantis' first punk concert featured the Slickee Boys, Urban Verbs, and White Boy on January 27, 1978. By early 1979, the Atlantis had closed, but the space would reopen under new ownership on May 31, 1980, as the Nightclub 9:30—soon known as 9:30 Club—and serve as an important part of the D.C. punk scene's foundation.

Among the earliest Washington, D.C., punk bands formed in the early 1980s were Iron Cross, the Velvet Monkeys, Bad Brains, the Teen Idles, the Untouchables, Minor Threat, S.O.A. (fronted by Henry Rollins), Chalk Circle, Void, the Faith, Youth Brigade, Government Issue, Scream, and Marginal Man. Bad Brains, who were the first hardcore punk band to form on the east coast of the United States, would influence a wave of new, more aggressive sounding bands in the city. One such band was the Slinkees. Despite the Slinkees only performing live once, three of their members would go on to form the Teen Idles in September 1979. The Teen Idles' 1980 EP Minor Disturbance was the earliest non-single release in the D.C. hardcore scene. The group broke up in November 1980, and band members Ian MacKaye and Jeff Nelson quickly formed Minor Threat, who debuted in December 1980.

Minor Threat profoundly influenced the hardcore punk genre, their contributions to the music, ethics, aesthetics, and ethos widely acknowledged by other hardcore bands. The band used faster rhythms and more aggressive, less melodic riffs than was common at the time. Minor Threat inspired the straight edge movement with its song "Straight Edge", which spoke out against alcohol, drugs and promiscuity. MacKaye and Nelson ran their own record label, Dischord Records, which released records by D.C. hardcore bands, commonly referred to as harDCore. The Flex Your Head compilation, released in January 1982, was a seminal document of the early 1980s D.C. hardcore scene. The record label was run out of the Dischord House, an Arlington, Virginia punk house. Henry Rollins, who would come to prominence as lead singer of the California-based Black Flag, as well as his own later Rollins Band, grew up in Washington, D.C., and was influenced by the music of Bad Brains and the bands of his childhood friend, Ian MacKaye.

The tradition of holding all ages shows at small D.I.Y. spaces, has roots in the early Washington, D.C., straight edge movement. It emerged from the idea that people of all ages should have access to music, regardless of if they're old enough to drink alcohol.

=== Post-hardcore ===
==== Origins and Revolution Summer ====
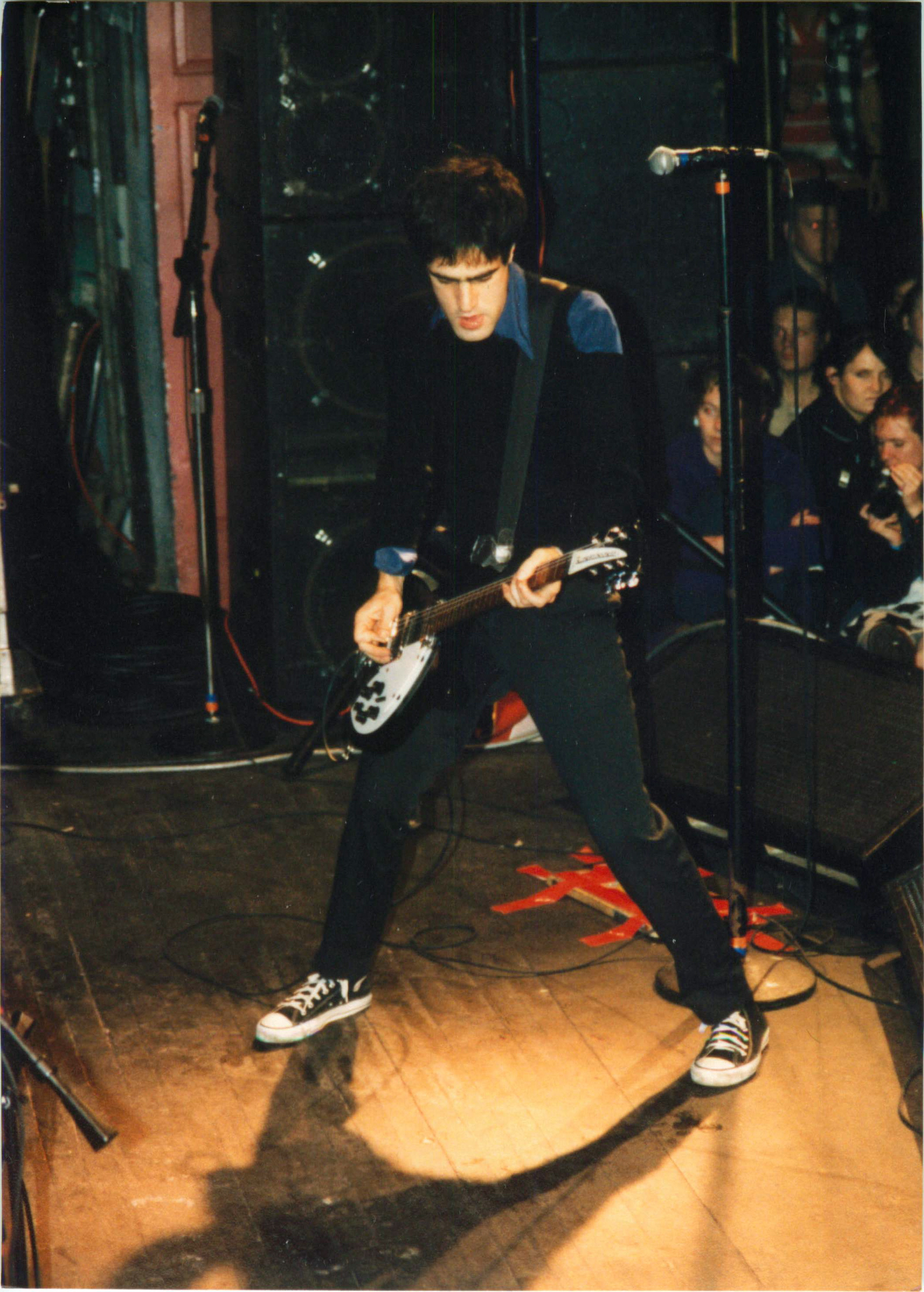
Guy Picciotto was in multiple pioneering post-hardcore bands from D.C. including Rites of Spring and Fugazi

When the Faith (with Alec MacKaye) put out the EP Subject to Change in 1983, it marked a critical evolution in the sound of D.C. hardcore and punk music in general. AllMusic writer Steve Huey described their music as "hint[ing] at what was to come, softening the standard-issue hardcore approach somewhat with better-developed melodies and a more inward-looking perspective"

Amy Pickering of Fire Party, who worked at Dischord records, proposed a concept to a number of musicians, which would entail a "re-birthing" the D.C. hardcore scene in the mid-1980s. This took shape under the name "Revolution Summer" in the summer of 1985. This movement was led by bands associated with Dischord Records. According to the Dischord website: "The violence and nihilism that had become identified with punk rock, largely by the media, had begun to take hold in DC and many of the older punks suddenly found themselves repelled and discouraged by their hometown scene," leading to "a time of redefinition." During these years, a new wave of bands started to form, including Rites of Spring, Lunchmeat (later to become Soulside), Gray Matter, Mission Impossible (with Dave Grohl who later joined Scream), Dag Nasty (formed by Brian Baker of Minor Threat with members of Bloody Mannequin Orchestra and Shawn Brown later in Swiz), Beefeater, and Embrace (with Ian MacKaye and members of the Faith). Rites of Spring has been described as the band that "more than led the change", challenging the "macho posturing that had become so prevalent within the punk scene at that point", and "more importantly", defying "musical and stylistic rule". Journalist Steve Huey writes that while the band "strayed from hardcore's typically external concerns of the time – namely, social and political dissent – their musical attack was no less blistering, and in fact a good deal more challenging and nuanced than the average three-chord speed-blur", a sound that, according to Huey, mapped out "a new direction for hardcore that built on the innovations" brought by Hüsker Dü's Zen Arcade. Other bands have been perceived as taking inspiration from genres such as funk (as in the case of Beefeater) and 1960s pop (such as the example of Gray Matter).

According to Eric Grubbs, a nickname was developed for the new sound, with some considering it "post-hardcore", but another name that floated around the scene was "emo-core". The latter, mentioned in skateboarding magazine Thrasher, would come up in discussions around the D.C. area. While some of these bands have been considered contributors to the birth of emo, with Rites of Spring sometimes being named as the first or one of the earliest emo acts, musicians such as the band's former frontman Guy Picciotto and MacKaye himself have voiced their opposition against the term.

==== Subsequent developments ====
The second half of the 1980s saw the formation of several bands in D.C., which included Shudder to Think, Jawbox, the Nation of Ulysses and Fugazi. MacKaye described this period as the busiest that the Dischord Records label had ever seen. Most of these acts, along with earlier ones, would contribute to the 1989 compilation State of the Union, a release that documented the new sound of the late 1980s D.C. punk scene. Fugazi gained "an extremely loyal and numerous global following", with reviewer Andy Kellman summarizing the band's influence with the statement: "To many, Fugazi meant as much to them as Bob Dylan did to their parents." The band, which included MacKaye, Picciotto, and former Rites of Spring drummer Brendan Canty along with bassist Joe Lally, issued in 1989 13 Songs, a compilation of their earlier self-titled and Margin Walker EPs, which is now considered a landmark album. Similarly, the band's debut full-length album, 1990's Repeater, has also been "generally" regarded as a classic. Fugazi garnered recognition for their activism, cheaply priced shows and CDs, and their resistance to mainstream outlets. On the other hand, Jawbox had been influenced by "the tradition of Chicago's thriving early-'80s scene", while The Nation of Ulysses are "best remembered for lifting the motor-mouthed revolutionary rhetoric of the MC5" with the incorporation of "elements of R&B (as filtered through the MC5) and avant jazz" combined with "exciting, volatile live gigs", and being the inspiration for "a new crop of bands both locally and abroad".

== Wider influence ==
Dischord Records, owned and run by Jeff Nelson and Ian MacKaye, both formerly of Minor Threat, is responsible for the distribution of a multitude of D.C. hardcore records, both early and current. As a result of Dischord's prominence, very few D.C.-based bands who were not on Dischord have received much attention from outside of the D.C. metro area.

Although not in D.C, there has been a steady hardcore punk scene in Baltimore, Maryland since the 80's. Notable bands being, Lungfish, Half Japanese, Stout, Next Step Up, Trapped Under Ice and more recently gaining international attention, Turnstile.

== Film ==
- Punk the Capital (2019) – documentary directed by James June Schneider and Paul Bishow
- Salad Days (2014) - documentary directed by Scott Crawford

== See also ==
- Positive Force, a punk activist organization based in Washington, D.C.
- Music of Washington, D.C.
