= State of Alert =

American hardcore punk band (1980–1981)

- Origin: Washington, D.C., U.S.
- Genre: Hardcore punk
- Years active: 1980–1981
- Label: Dischord
- Past members: Henry Rollins; Michael Hampton; Wendel Blow; Simon Jacobsen; Ivor Hanson

State of Alert (often abbreviated to S.O.A.) was an American hardcore punk group formed in Washington, D.C., in October 1980, and active until July 1981. S.O.A. was fronted by Henry Rollins, then using his original surname Garfield.

== History ==
S.O.A. was formed in October 1980, after the members of a previous group, the Extorts, lost their vocalist Lyle Preslar and hired Rollins, then known by his birth name Henry Garfield. The original lineup consisted of Rollins (vocals), Michael Hampton (guitar), Wendel Blow (bass) and Simon Jacobsen (drums).

During December 1980 and January 1981, the group recorded the 10-song 7-inch EP No Policy at Inner Ear Studios in Arlington, Virginia, produced by Skip Groff and engineered by Inner Ear owner Don Zientara. It was released on Dischord Records in March 1981, as the label's second release. No Policy was financed by Rollins, as Dischord was tied up in releasing Minor Threat's debut EP.

Circa April 1981, drummer Jacobsen was replaced by Ivor Hanson. At the time, Hanson's father was a top admiral in the US Navy and his family lived on the grounds of the Naval Observatory. The band held their practices there and had to be let in by Secret Service agents.

S.O.A. played a total of nine concerts in and around the eastern United States. Among them:

- 1980-12-06 - Washington, D.C. (the first show)
- 1980-12-13 - 1929 Calvert St., Washington, D.C.
- 1980-12-17 - Unheard Music Festival, D.C. Space, 7th & Enw., Washington, D.C.
- 1980-12-18 - Unheard Music Festival, D.C. Space, 7th & Enw., Washington, D.C.
- 1981-01-10 - The 9:30 Club, 930 F Street NW, Washington, D.C.
- 1981-04-04 - The Wilson Center, Washington, D.C.
- 1981-07-10 - Philadelphia (the last show)

Rollins later described their performances: "All of them were 11 to 14 minutes in duration because the songs were all like 40 seconds... and the rest of the time we were going, 'Are you ready? Are you ready?' Those gigs were poorly played songs in between 'Are you readys?"

Three S.O.A. songs ("I Hate the Kids", UK Subs cover "Disease" and Boyce and Hart cover "Stepping Stone Party") were posthumously included on the influential Dischord compilation Flex Your Head, issued in January 1982.

No Policy was later included, in its entirety, on the Dischord compilations Four Old 7-inchs on a 12-inch (1984) and Dischord 1981: The Year in Seven Inches (1995). In 2014, Dischord issued a 7-inch EP of early demos, titled First Demo 12/29/80.

== Legacy and other projects ==
Today, S.O.A. is remembered primarily as Rollins' first band – before he joined Black Flag and then founded Rollins Band – but also as an example of early "DC hardcore" and an influence on other bands such as Detroit's Negative Approach and New York City's Agnostic Front.

Hampton and Hanson went on to form the Faith in 1981 with Alec MacKaye (brother of Ian MacKaye), and then Embrace with Ian MacKaye in 1985. In 1986, Hampton joined One Last Wish with Guy Picciotto (Fugazi, Rites of Spring) and Brendan Canty (Deadline, Fugazi, Rites of Spring)., and also played in the Snakes. Moving to indie rock, Hampton joined forces again with Hanson to form Manifesto in 1988, and later played with members of Ivy in Paco.

Blow went on to play in Iron Cross and Lethal Intent.

== Band members ==
Former members

- Henry Garfield − lead vocals (1980−1981)
- Michael Hampton − guitar (1980−1981)
- Wendel Blow − bass (1980−1981)
- Simon Jacobsen − drums (1980−1981)
- Ivor Hanson − drums (1981)

== Discography ==
=== EPs ===
- No Policy 7-inch (1981, Dischord)
- First Demo 12/29/80 7-inch (2014, Dischord)

=== Compilation appearances ===
- "I Hate the Kids", "Disease" and "Stepping Stone Party" on Flex Your Head (1982, Dischord)
- complete No Policy on Four Old 7-inchs on a 12-inch (1984, Dischord)
- complete No Policy on Dischord 1981: The Year in Seven Inches (1995, Dischord)
- "Public Defender" on 20 Years Of Dischord (1980 - 2000) box set (2002, Dischord)
