= The Faith / Void =

Studio album by the Faith / Void
- Released: September 1982
- Recorded: May 22, 1982 (The Faith side); 1982 (Void side)
- Studio: Inner Ear Studios
- Genre: Hardcore punk
- Length: 28:00
- Labels: Dischord; DIS08
- Producers: Ian MacKaye; Don Zientara

Void chronology
Condensed Flesh (1982)	The Faith / Void (1982)	Potion for Bad Dreams (Unreleased)

The Faith chronology
The Faith / Void (1982)	Subject to Change (1983)

The Faith / Void is a split album by D.C. hardcore bands the Faith and Void, released on Dischord Records in 1982. Void was one of the earliest examples of hardcore/metal crossover with their chaotic musical approach cited as particularly influential.

== Background and influence ==
The Faith and Void were hardcore bands from Washington D.C., both with few releases (this is Void's only release throughout the band's existence), but the record built a relatively large underground following among punk and hardcore punk fans. Both bands were connected to Dischord Records, the punk label run by Ian MacKaye and Jeff Nelson of Minor Threat and were considered pioneers of DC Hardcore.

Kurt Cobain listed the album in his top fifty albums of all time.

== Release history ==
The record was the eighth release in the Dischord catalog. Originally, it was available in a test pressing with a handmade sleeve, followed by a regular pressing in cardboard sleeve with two lyrics inserts, one per band, both made in 1982. Dischord has since remastered the album and re-released it twice—in 2008 on clear purple vinyl, and in 2011 on black vinyl.

== Critical reception ==
Professional ratings
Review scores
Source	Rating
AllMusic	4/5 stars

Writing for The Guardian, Craig Finn of the Hold Steady referred to the split as “one of the most vital hardcore records ever released” and continued: “It's a reminder of hardcore at its finest: angry and dangerous without being cartoonish”.

Punknews called the Void side of the split “probably the most influential on the punk-thrash scene of the 90's”.

In 2026 Rolling Stone placed it at 98 on their list of the 100 Greatest Punk Albums of All Time.

== Track listing ==
All tracks are written by The Faith.

Side A: The Faith
No.	Title	Length
1.	"It's Time"
2.	"Face to Face"
3.	"Trapped"
4.	"In Control"
5.	"Another Victim"
6.	"What's Wrong with Me?"
7.	"What You Think"
8.	"Confusion"
9.	"You're X'd"
10.	"Nightmare"
11.	"Don't Tell Me"
12.	"In the Black"

All tracks are written by Void.

Side B: Void
No.	Title	Length
1.	"Who Are You?"
2.	"Time to Die"
3.	"Condensed Flesh"
4.	"Ignorant People"
5.	"Change Places"
6.	"Ask Them Why"
7.	"Organized Sports"
8.	"My Rules"
9.	"Self-Defense"
10.	"War Hero"
11.	"Think"
12.	"Explode"

== Re-issue ==
Dischord re-issued the album on compact disc in November 1993, with the following extra tracks (from the Faith's Subject to Change EP). The disc was remastered at Silver Sonya in 2002 and subsequently re-released.

No.	Title	Length
1.	"Aware"
2.	"Say No More"
3.	"Limitations"
4.	"Subject to Change"
5.	"Untitled"
6.	"More of the Same"
7.	"Slowdown"

== Personnel ==
The Faith / Void personnel as listed in the album liner notes.

=== Musicians ===
==== Void ====
- John Weiffenbach – vocals
- Jon "Bubba" Dupree – guitars, cover [Void]
- Chris Stover – bass
- Sean Finnegan – drums

==== The Faith ====
- Alec MacKaye – vocals
- Michael Hampton – guitars
- Chris "Bald" Kirschten – bass, backing vocals
- Ivor Hanson – drums

===== Additional musicians =====
- Ian MacKaye, Jeff Nelson – backing vocals (Faith side)

=== Technical personnel ===
- Ian MacKaye, Don Zientara, Jeff Nelson – producer (all tracks), mixing engineer (Faith side)
  - Don Zientara – sound engineer
  - Bert Queiroz, Void – producer (Void side)
- Void – artwork (Void side)
- Malcom Riviera – photography [Faith cover]
- Tiffany Pruitt – photography [Faith poster photos]
