= Nic fit =

Nic fit is a colloquial expression for nicotine withdrawal. It may also refer to:

== Music ==
- "Nic Fit", a song by American hardcore punk band the Untouchables
  - "Nic Fit", a cover of the Untouchables' song on Sonic Youth's album Dirty
