= Embrace (American band Embrace album) =

Studio album by Embrace
- Released: September 1987
- Recorded: November 1985 – February 1986
- Studio: Inner Ear
- Genre: Post-hardcore; emo
- Length: 33:18
- Label: Dischord
- Producer: Embrace, Ian MacKaye, Edward Janney

Alternate cover art
- 1992 CD reissue cover.

Professional ratings
Review scores
Source	Rating
AllMusic	3/5 stars
LAS Magazine	Favorable

Embrace is the debut studio album (and only release) by American post-hardcore band Embrace.

The album, released by Dischord Records, consists of songs composed and performed in the context of Washington, D.C.'s 1985 Revolution Summer by one of its mainstay acts. Although recorded between November 1985 and February 1986, the album would not be released until 1987, after the demise of that social movement and the dissolution of the band.

== Style ==
According to music journalist Andrew Earles, Ian and Alec MacKaye's previous bands Minor Threat and The Faith were composed of "highly intelligent, creatively restless personalities--precisely the types artistically fleeing hardcore in droves". Building off the aggression of Minor Threat, the album draws influence from New Order, The Cure, and "late-'70s/early-'80s" post-punk, which Earles says the band played "through the filter of tuneful post-hardcore.

== Production and release ==
Embrace was compiled from the only two studio sessions the band recorded. The first eleven tracks were laid down in November 1985, while the other three were done in February 1986. All of the songs were recorded by the same lineup at Inner Ear Studios in Arlington, Virginia, with Don Zientara as audio engineer.

The album was released in September 1987 on Dischord Records, in LP format. (Note: Dischord #DIS 24)

== Critical reception ==
Though not "as gripping or inventive" as that of Fugazi's, the music in the record, "as a vehicle for [Ian MacKaye's] righteous, cutting lyrics and strong voice", is "more than fine", according to reviewer Ned Raggett, who has described it as having production values that switched around from the "usual domination via guitar" with an emphasis on Ivor Hanson's drums, while comparing the work of guitarist Michael Hampton to John McGeoch's early work with post-punk bands Magazine and Siouxsie and the Banshees.

Trouser Press, for its part, was of the view that:

"If not equal to Minor Threat's one-of-a-kind sonic excellence, Embrace['s instrumentals] are strong and muscular, an effective backdrop for MacKaye ... The confrontational lyricist [that delivers] an impressive [vocal] performance ... transforming an okay mid-tempo punk LP into a great one."

For Mark Jenkins, co-author with Mark Andersen of the book Dance of Days: Two Decades of Punk in the Nation's Capital: (Note: Andersen, Mark; Jenkins, Mark (2001). Dance of Days: Two Decades of Punk in the Nation's Capital. Soft Skull Press. ISBN 9781887128490.)

"Embrace featured some of Ian MacKaye's most vivid and direct (and frequently angry) sermons against greed, delusion and self-destruction, backed by tight, tuneful and slightly psychedelic punk."

Jenkins also pointed out that:

"Not all the lyrics are MacKaye's ... bassist Chris Bald, who named the band, had a major role in shaping its sensibility."

== Reissues ==
In 1992, Embrace was reissued on CD (Note: Dischord #DIS 24CD) and Compact Cassette, (Note: Dischord #DIS 24C) featuring alternate cover art.

In 2002, the original album was remastered by Chad Clark at Silver Sonya Recording and Mastering in Arlington, Virginia, for its re-release on CD, featuring, as bonus tracks, previously unreleased alternate versions of "Money" (Note: Aka "Money Song".) and "Dance of Days" taken from band's second recording session. This edition was reissued in 2008 on red vinyl, although without the additional cuts. (Note: However, it came with a free coupon for the digital download in MP3 format of the entire album and its two bonus tracks.)

Also in 2002, the song "Money" was featured on the 3-CD compilation box set 20 Years of Dischord. (Note: Dischord #DIS 125)

In 2009, the album was remastered again, this time at Chicago Mastering Service in Chicago, Illinois, for a reissue in its original vinyl disc format and cover art. (Note: It included a free coupon for the digital download of the 2002 remastered version of the album, including its bonus tracks.)

== Track listings ==
=== 1987 LP release ===
All tracks are written by Embrace

Side A
No.	Title	Length
1.	"Give Me Back"	2:32
2.	"Dance of Days"	2:16
3.	"Building"	1:58
4.	"Past"	1:53
5.	"Spoke"	2:00
6.	"Do Not Consider Yourself Free"	2:23
7.	"No More Pain"	3:11

Side B
No.	Title	Length
1.	"I Wish I"	2:11
2.	"Said Gun"	2:11
3.	"Can't Forgive"	2:31
4.	"Money"	2:37
5.	"If I Never Thought About It"	2:32
6.	"End of a Year"	2:36
7.	"Last Song"	2:27
Total length:		33:18

=== 2002 remastered CD reissue ===
All tracks are written by Embrace.

No.	Title	Length
1.	"Give Me Back"	2:32
2.	"Dance of Days"	2:16
3.	"Building"	1:58
4.	"Past"	1:53
5.	"Spoke"	2:00
6.	"Do Not Consider Yourself Free"	2:23
7.	"No More Pain"	3:11
8.	"I Wish I"	2:11
9.	"Said Gun"	2:11
10.	"Can't Forgive"	2:31
11.	"Money"	2:37
12.	"If I Never Thought About It"	2:32
13.	"End of a Year"	2:36
14.	"Last Song"	2:27

Bonus tracks
No.	Title	Length
15.	"Money" (alternate version)	2:48
16.	"Dance of Days" (alternate version)	2:41
Total length:		38:47

== Personnel ==
Embrace

- Ian MacKaye – vocals
- Mike Hampton – guitar (except for track B5)
- Chris Bald – bass
- Ivor Hanson – drums
- Edward Janney – guitar (B5)

Production

- Embrace – production (A1 to B4)
- Ian MacKaye – co-production (B5 to B7)
- Edward Janney – co-production (B5 to B7)
- Don Zientara – engineering
- Chris Bald – artwork (front cover drawing)
- Cynthia Connolly – artwork (back cover screen printing)
- Leslie Clague – photography

Additional production (1992 CD and MC reissues)

- J. Robbins – graphic design
- Chris Bald – artwork (front cover drawing)
- Cynthia Connolly – artwork (CD back cover screen printing)
- Leslie Clague – photography
- Tina Atkinson – photography
- Kathy Cashel – typography
- Jane Bogart – illegible credit

Additional production (2002 remastered CD reissue)

- Ian MacKaye – co-production (15, 16)
- Edward Janney – co-production (15, 16)
- Chad Clark – remastering
- Jason Farrell – graphic design
- Chris Bald – artwork (front cover drawing)
- Cynthia Connolly – artwork (inlay screen printing)
- Leslie Clague – photography
- Dave McDuff – photography

Additional production (2009 remastered LP reissue)

- Jason Ward – remastering

== See also ==
- Revolution Summer
