= Skewbald/Grand Union (EP) =

EP by Skewbald/Grand Union
- Released: 1991
- Recorded: November 1981
- Studio: Inner Ear (Arlington, Virginia)
- Genre: Hardcore punk
- Length: 4:07
- Label: Dischord
- Producer: Skewbald/Grand Union

Skewbald/Grand Union, also known as 2 Songs, is the eponymous archival EP featuring the only studio recordings by American hardcore punk band Skewbald/Grand Union.

== Background and band history ==
Commonly known as simply Skewbald, Skewbald/Grand Union was a short-lived hardcore punk band from Washington, D.C., founded by Ian MacKaye and Jeff Nelson, after their previous band, Minor Threat, broke up for their first time in September 1981. (Note: Minor Threat played a "farewell" gig around Christmas 1981.) Their lineup was rounded out by guitarist Edward Janney (Note: Formerly of Untouchables, later played in the Faith, Rites of Spring, One Last Wish, and Happy Go Licky.) and bassist John Falls. (Note: Who had briefly played guitar with Youth Brigade.)

The band's strange name was a result of a friendly dispute between MacKaye and Nelson. The four-piece was initially named Grand Union, after a nearby grocery store. MacKaye then found the word "skewbald" in a dictionary, and thought it was a better name. Nelson, however, still preferred Grand Union. The two were unable to favor either title, and the disagreement was never settled.

In November 1981, the band recorded three untitled demo songs, not originally intended for release, in a self-produced session, engineered by Don Zientara at Inner Ear Studios in Arlington, Virginia. After recording, the rehearsals came to a halt and Falls left the project. Eventually, MacKaye moved from vocals to bass and the band practiced as a three-piece a few more times in early 1982, but Skewbald/Grand Union, who never came to play a show, was dissolved upon the reformation of Minor Threat in the spring of 1982. (Note: The reformed Minor Threat played their first show in April 1982.)

== Release ==
Professional ratings
Review scores
Source	Rating
AllMusic	3/5 stars

For ten years, the recordings of Skewbald/Grand Union made the rounds in tape trading circles and some erroneously believed that the songs were Minor Threat outtakes.

In 1991, the demo received a proper release, on 7-inch clear vinyl, when Dischord Records issued the one-sided EP Skewbald/Grand Union (Note: Dischord #DIS 50V) to commemorate the label's 50th release. Two out of the three songs were merged on the first track.

== Reissues ==
Skewbald/Grand Union was reissued as a CD EP (Note: Dischord #DIS 50CD) in October 1997. Individual tracks were made also available as digital downloads.

In 2002, the medley "Sorry/Change for the Same" was featured on the 3-CD compilation box set 20 Years of Dischord. (Note: Dischord #DIS 125)

== Track listing ==
All tracks written by Skewbald/Grand Union

1. "Side One" (unofficially known as "Sorry / Change for the Same") (2:54)
2. "Side Two" (unofficially known as "You're Not Fooling Me") (1:13)

== Personnel ==
From left: Edward Janney, John Falls, Ian MacKaye, Jeff Nelson. Photo by Michael Salkind

- Ian MacKaye – vocals
- Edward Janney – guitar
- John Falls – bass
- Jeff Nelson – drums

Production

- Skewbald – production
- Don Zientara – engineering
