= Rites of Spring (album) =

Studio album by Rites of Spring
- Released: June 1985
- Recorded: February 1985
- Genres: Emo; hardcore punk; post-hardcore; punk rock
- Length: 37:32
- Label: Dischord
- Producer: Ian MacKaye

Rites of Spring chronology
Rites of Spring (1985)	All Through a Life (1987)

Rites of Spring is the only studio album by American hardcore punk band Rites of Spring. It was recorded at Inner Ear Studios in February 1985 and released on vinyl in June 1985 as Dischord Records #16. The album was produced by Ian MacKaye and contains twelve songs.

The album was re-released on CD and cassette in 1987, with an additional track from the same session, "Other Way Around", as well as the four songs from the Rites' follow-up EP, All Through a Life (track 14–17), recorded January 1986 and released in 1987 (Dischord #22). End on End features the same cover as the debut album.

== Production ==
Guy Picciotto has said of the recording process for the album:

"That record was way closer to the live experience than the first demo. It was recorded with all four of us in one tiny room facing each other with no separation at all. We tracked all the music live in one take in the dark with a strobe going. Later on, I recorded all the vocals for the 13 songs in one take as well, one after the other. There are barely any overdubs at all — just some backups, a few bits of percussion and maybe a guitar part here and there. We played the improv ending on the last song, ‘End On End,’ until the tape ran out and rolled off the reels."

== Music ==
Influenced by The Faith, Rites of Spring continued to combine desperate introspective lyrics with angry melody-tinged songwriting that moved even further from the hardcore punk formula. The album has been described as "uncommonly melodic." Evan Rytlewski of Pitchfork delineated Guy Picciotto's vocal style on the album: "Underscoring the seething despair in his lyrics, Picciotto sang as if choking on a Brillo pad, punishing his larynx until all that remained was a tattered rasp. He effectively turned singing into a form of self-flagellation." He called Picciotto's vocal performance "one of the most violent, demanding vocal performances ever captured on record," and further explained: "For all the musicianship hidden under the hood, it's hard to register anything other than the fury and agony at the surface. It’s a portrait of crisis."

== Reception and legacy ==
Professional ratings
Review scores
Source	Rating
AllMusic	4.5/5 stars

The album was listed at number 30 on Kurt Cobain's top 50 favorite albums. Pitchfork online magazine ranked it number 96 on its list of the Top 100 Albums of the 1980s. It has appeared on various best-of emo album lists by Consequence of Sound, Kerrang!, LA Weekly, and Rolling Stone, as well as by journalists Leslie Simon and Trevor Kelley in their book Everybody Hurts: An Essential Guide to Emo Culture (2007). Metal Hammer named the album in their list of "the 10 essential post-hardcore albums."

Editors at Kerrang said: "Though the definition of what emo actually is remains contentious, there’s no denying that it began right here." Kelefa Sanneh described it as "the first emo album, and still one of the greatest. It was a volatile album, with Picciotto screaming lyrics that a different singer may have chosen to whisper.

In 2026 Rolling Stone placed it at 41 on their list of The 100 Greatest Punk Albums of All Time.

== Track listing ==
All tracks are written by Rites of Spring.

No.	Title	Length
1.	"Spring"	2:09
2.	"Deeper Than Inside"	2:17
3.	"For Want Of"	3:09
4.	"Hain's Point"	2:08
5.	"All There Is"	2:54
6.	"Drink Deep"	4:54
7.	"Theme"	2:19
8.	"By Design"	2:38
9.	"Remainder"	2:30
10.	"Persistent Vision"	2:21
11.	"Nudes"	2:48
12.	"End on End"	7:23
Total length:		37:32

== Personnel ==
=== Rites of Spring ===
- Guy Picciotto – vocals, guitars
- Eddie Janney – guitars
- Mike Fellows – bass
- Brendan Canty – drums

=== Additional personnel ===
- Ian MacKaye – backing vocals

=== Technical personnel ===
- Ian MacKaye and Michael Hampton – production
