= Untouchables (punk band) =

Washington, D.C., punk band

- Origin: Washington, D.C., United States
- Genres: Punk rock, hardcore punk
- Years active: 1979–1981
- Labels: Dischord Records
- Past members: Alec MacKaye; Edward Janney; Bert Queiroz; Rich Moore

The Untouchables were an American hardcore punk band that arose from the Washington, D.C. hardcore punk scene of the late 1970s and early 1980s. The band existed from October 1979 until January 1981 and released four tracks.

The Untouchables spawned a wide range of Washington, D.C., musical talents. Alec MacKaye, younger brother of Minor Threat/Fugazi member and Dischord Records founder Ian MacKaye, went on to sing with The Faith, Ignition and The Warmers. Guitarist Edward Janney went on to play with The Faith, Rites of Spring, One Last Wish, Skewbald/Grand Union and Happy Go Licky. Bassist Bert Queiroz later played in Youth Brigade, Double-O, Second Wind, Meatmen, Rain and Manifesto. Drummer Richard Moore also played in the Meatmen, Double-O and Second Wind. Together Richard Moore and Bert Queiroz started their own independent record label, R&B Records.

The Untouchables only released a demo tape which later appeared on Dischord Records' Flex Your Head compilation and 20 Years of Dischord. Their most famous song was "Nic Fit", which would be covered by Sonic Youth on their 1992 album Dirty. The song was also featured in the 2006 music documentary American Hardcore.

== Members ==
- Alec MacKaye - vocals
- Eddie Janney - guitar
- Bert Queiroz - bass
- Rich Moore - drums

== Discography ==
(the group's known four tracks were released on compilations)

- Flex Your Head - "Rat Patrol", "Nic Fit", "I Hate You"
- 20 Years of Dischord - "(I'm Not Your) Steppin' Stone", "Nic Fit"
- American Hardcore: The History of American Punk Rock 1980-1986 - "Nic Fit"
