= Manifesto (band) =

American rock band

- Origin: Washington, D.C., United States
- Genres: Indie rock; post-punk; emo
- Years active: 1988–1993
- Labels: Fire
- Past members: Michael Hampton; Bert Queiroz; Ivor Hanson

Manifesto was an American rock band from Washington, D.C., United States, featuring Michael Hampton (vocals, guitar, drum programming), Bert Queiroz (bass) and Ivor Hanson (drums). It was formed in 1988 after the demise of Hampton's previous short-lived bands, Embrace and One Last Wish. The trio's recording debut was the 7-inch single "Burn", released in 1988 on Skip Groff's Y&T Records. In 1992, they released their self-titled and only studio album through British independent record label Fire Records. The following year, shortly after their album was released in the United States, Manifesto disbanded.

In contrast to the hardcore punk–indebted sound of Hampton's previous bands, Manifesto features a poppier sound, taking influences from guitar and jangle pop groups of the 1980s. As a result, the band worked with producer John A. Rivers, who produced for various British guitar pop bands such as Close Lobsters and the Pastels, on its debut album.

== Band members ==
- Michael Hampton – vocals, guitar, drum programming
- Bert Queiroz – bass guitar
- Ivor Hanson – drums

== Discography ==
=== Studio albums ===
- Manifesto (1992)

=== EPs ===
- History (1990)
- Pattern 26 (1993)

=== Singles ===
- "Burn / Longtime" (1988)
- "Walking Backwards" (1991)
- "Gravity" (1992)
- "Pattern 26" (1992)
- "Sugar" (1992)
