= Three (band) =

Post-hardcore band from Washington, D.C.

Three was a post-hardcore band that released music on Dischord Records. The group was active from summer 1986 until its breakup in early 1988. Despite its brief tenure, the band was notable for both its association with Dischord and for taking D.C. punk "further into melodic territory" with songwriting and vocal arrangements "that innovated post-hardcore and power pop in equal measure."

The band's initial lineup included Ian MacKaye and Jeff Nelson of Minor Threat, along with Geoff Turner and Steve Niles of Gray Matter. MacKaye soon left the band and was replaced by Mark Haggerty, also from Gray Matter. Following MacKaye's departure, the group sought a new singer—auditioning Bruce Merkle of 9353—before deciding to proceed with Turner as vocalist. "Turner's increasingly sophisticated songwriting and Nelson's powerful, precise drumming distinguished the band from Gray Matter," Mark Andersen and Mark Jenkins observed in their history of the Washington, D.C. punk scene, Dance of Days.

Three's final concert was with Happy Go Licky (also giving their farewell performance) and Bastro on January 1, 1988. The concert occurred at Washington, D.C.'s 9:30 Club.

Their sole album, Dark Days Coming, was recorded at Inner Ear Studios in 1988. It was produced by the band, mixed by MacKaye, and engineered by Don Zientara. The album was released on LP and cassette by Dischord Records in 1989, after the band broke up. It was reissued in expanded form on compact disc in 1997, adding ten demos and instrumentals that the band recorded at Turner's studio, WGNS, in 1987. The expanded version was remastered in 2010. The artwork for Dark Days Coming included photography by Cynthia Connolly and Naomi Petersen.

Three also contributed an acoustic version of their song, "Swann Street," to the State of the Union compilation that Dischord Records released in 1989. "Swann Street" was described by Washingtonian magazine as one of the D.C. punk scene's "most enduring songs" and "an anthem of youthful confusion that still resonates." The 2025 book Keep Your Ear to the Ground: A History of Punk Fanzines in Washington, D.C. drew its title from the chorus to "Swann Street."

Persistent Vision, an exhibit of the University of Maryland's archival collections on D.C. punk, described the Dark Days Coming tracks "Swann Street," “Don’t Walk Away,” and “International,” as "powerfully anthemic."

== Discography ==
=== Albums ===
- Dark Days Coming (1989), Dischord Records

=== Compilation appearances ===
- State of the Union (1989) - "Swann Street"
- 20 Years of Dischord (2002) - "Domino Days"
