= Don Zientara =

American record producer and musician (born 1949)

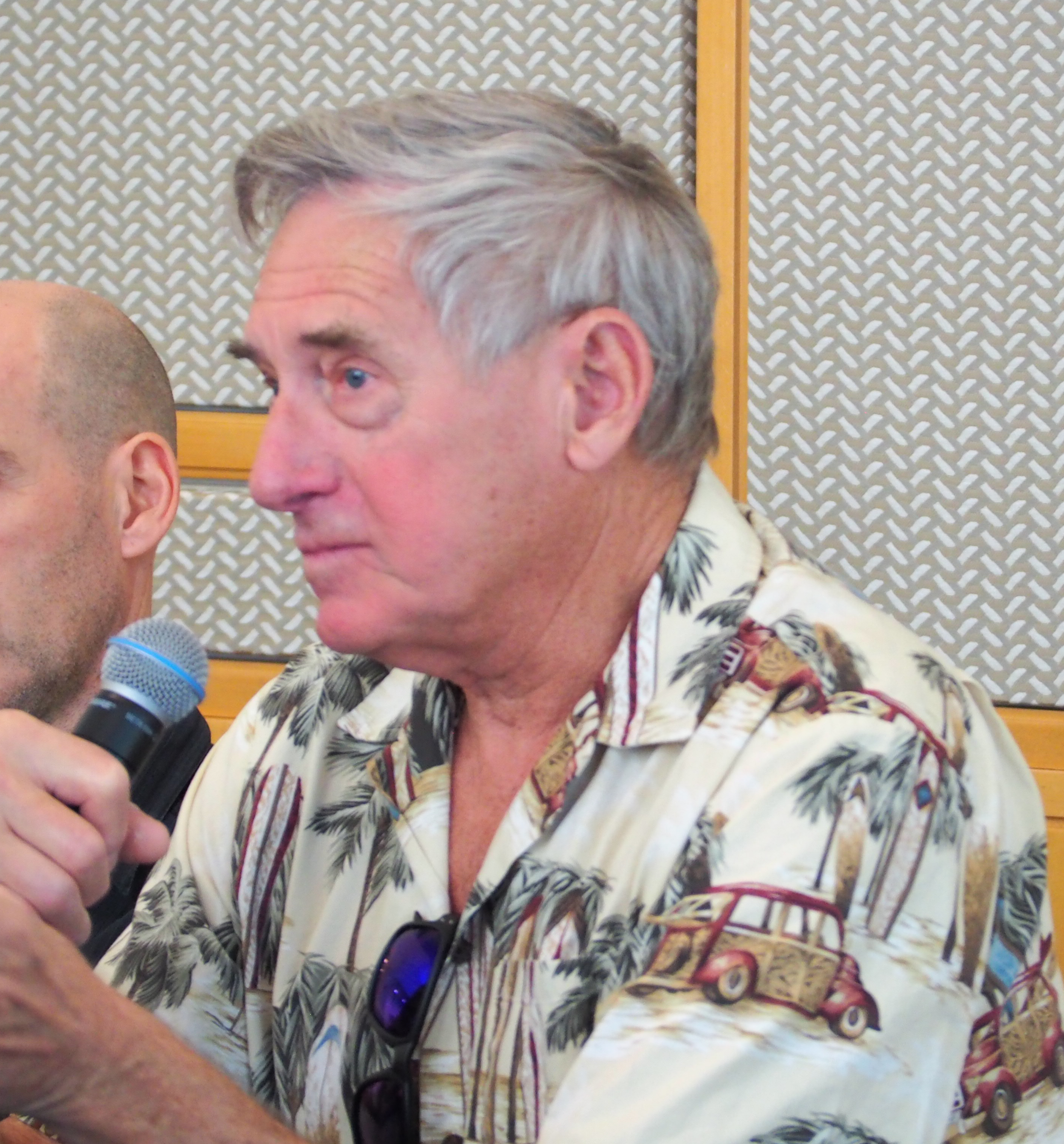

Background information
- Born: 1948 (age 77–78)
- Genres: Rock, hardcore punk, post-hardcore, post-punk, art rock, alternative rock
- Occupation: producer
- Years active: 1978–present
- Website: innerearstudio.com

Don Zientara (/ˌzənˈtɛərə/ zən-TAIR-ə) is an American record producer and musician. He owns and runs Inner Ear Studios in Arlington, Virginia, located just outside Washington D.C., and is most widely known for his production work with Fugazi, Minor Threat and various other Dischord Records artists.

Zientara released four albums of music on the Northern Liberties label. Music by Zientara has also been released by Crooked Beat Records in Alexandria, Virginia. He contributed four songs to A Bang On The Ear, released in 2016 for Record Store Day. He also contributed to Recutting The Crap, Volume One, a tribute to the Clash released by Crooked Beat Records.

== Production credits ==
Zientara's production/engineering credits include the following:

- Minor Threat – Minor Threat (1981)
- Government Issue – Legless Bull (1981)
- Void/Faith – Void/Faith split (1982)
- No Trend – Teen Love (1982)
- Scream – Still Screaming (1983)
- Minor Threat – Out of Step (1983)
- No Trend – Too Many Humans..... (1983)
- Government Issue – Boycott Stabb (1983)
- United Mutation – Fugitive Family (1983)
- Faith – Subject to Change (1983)
- Marginal Man – Identity (1984)
- Baby Opaque - Pain, Fears, and Insects (EP) (1984)
- Minor Threat – Salad Days (1985)
- The Neighbors – Famous Potatoes (1985)
- Scream – This Side Up (1985)
- Rites of Spring – Rites of Spring (1985)
- Reptile House – I Stumble As The Crow Flies (1985)
- Baby Opaque - Fugue in Cow Minor (1985)
- Dag Nasty – Can I Say (1986)
- Egg Hunt – "Me and You" (1986)
- Gray Matter – Take it Back (1986)
- The Neighbors – Welcome Wagon (1986)
- Embrace – Embrace (1987) [above source lists 1985]
- Rites of Spring – All Through a Life (1987)
- Solution Unknown – Karen (1987)
- Soulside – Less Deep Inside Keeps (1987)
- Shudder to Think – It Was Arson (1988)
- Half Japanese – Charmed Life (1988)
- Fugazi – 13 Songs (1989)
- Fugazi – Repeater (1990)
- Jawbox – Jawbox (1990)
- Shudder to Think – Ten Spot (1991)
- Jawbox – Grippe (1991)
- Fugazi – Steady Diet of Nothing (1991)
- Nation of Ulysses – 13-Point Program to Destroy America (1991)
- Skewbald/Grand Union – Skewbald/Grand Union (EP) (1991)
- Jawbox – Tongues (1992)
- Tribal Voice – Salvation Machine (1992)
- Circus Lupus – Super Genius (1992)
- Lungfish – Talking Songs for Walking
- Shudder to Think – Get Your Goat (1992)
- Gray Matter – Thog (1992)
- Jawbox – Novelty (1992)
- Fugazi – In on the Kill Taker (1993)
- Nation of Ulysses – Plays Pretty for Baby (1993)
- Scream – Fumble (1993)
- Slant 6 – What Kind of Monster Are You (1993)
- Ignition – Complete Services (1994)
- Lungfish – "Pass and Stow" (1994)
- SPUR- Get Your Way (1995)
- Fugazi – Red Medicine (1995)
- Assalti Frontali – Conflitto (1996)
- Bluetip – Dischord No. 101 (1996)
- The Delta 72 – The R&B of Membership (1996)
- Bad Brains – Black Dots (1996)
- The Warmers – The Warmers (1996)
- Lungfish – "Indivisible" (1997)
- SPUR – Moon Doggies (1997)
- Fugazi – End Hits (1998)
- The Decepticonz – "Rot Your Brain" (1998)
- Lungfish – The Unanimous Hour (1999)
- One Last Wish – 1986 (1999)
- Fugazi – Instrument Soundtrack (1999)
- Faraquet – The View from This Tower (2000)
- Q and Not U – No Kill No Beep Beep (2000)
- Fugazi – Furniture + 2 (2001)
- Fugazi – The Argument (2001)
- xbxrx – Clear EP (2001)
- Q and Not U – On Play Patterns (2002)
- Q and Not U – Different Damage (2003)
- John Frusciante – DC EP (2004)
- The Evens – 12 Songs (2005)
- The Walkmen – A Hundred Miles Off (2006)
- Joe Lally – There to Here (2006)
- The Evens – Get Evens (2006)
- End of a Year – Sincerely (2006)
- Joe Lally – Nothing is Underrated (2007)
- Twin Earth – Extended Play Demonstration (2008)
- Dag Nasty – Dag with Shawn (2010)
- Möbius Strip – Escalate. (2011)
- Cinema Cinema – Shoot the Freak (2011)
- Cinema Cinema – Manic Children and The Slow Aggression (2012)
- Möbius Strip – Step Down (2013)
- Marc Ganancias – Policy of Discontent (2013) – engineering, production, additional guitars
- Braddock Station Garrison – High Water (2013)
- Möbius Strip – Palabras Podridas (2014)
- Fellowcraft – Get Up Young Phoenix (2016)
- Möbius Strip – There is No Silver Lining (2016)
- Lisa Said– No Turn Left Behind (2016)
- Staunton – Inside Out (unreleased) (2016)
- Braddock Station Garrison – Saint Stephanie and the Stones (2017)
- Braddock Station Garrison – American Radio (2019)
- Three Second Kiss – From Fire I Save the Flame (2024)
