= Mike Fellows (musician) =

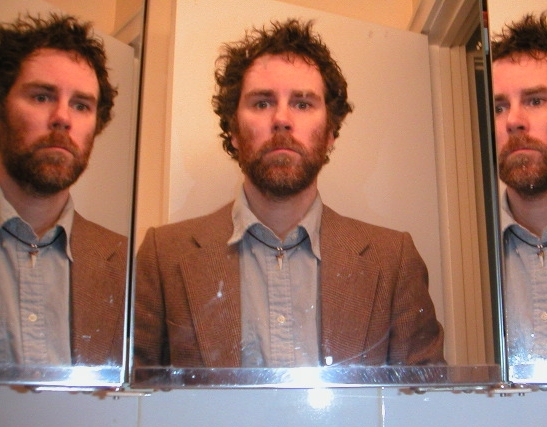

Background information
- Born: Michael Fellows; Washington, D.C., U.S.
- Occupation: Musician
- Instrument: Bass

Mike Fellows, also known as Miighty Flashlight, is an American musician who has performed and recorded with a variety of groups and artists since the early 1980s, notably Rites of Spring, Silver Jews and Endless Boogie, among others. During the 1990s, he was the tour manager for Mogwai.
