= Beefeater (band) =

American post-hardcore band

- Origin: Washington D.C.
- Genres: Hardcore punk, post-hardcore, emocore
- Years active: 1984–1986
- Label: Dischord Records
- Past members: Tomas Squip; Fred "Freak" Smith (died 2017); Dug E.Bird (Birdzell); Bruce Taylor; Mark Shellhaas; Kenny Craun

Beefeater was an American post-hardcore band from late 1984 until late 1986. Along with Embrace, Gray Matter, and Rites of Spring, they were one of the mainstay acts of the 1985 Revolution Summer movement which took place within the Washington, D.C. hardcore punk scene.

== History ==
Beefeater was formed by Tomas Squip (who later adopted the name Oman Emmet), Fred "Freak" Smith, Dug E. Bird (Birdzell) and Bruce Atchley Taylor. Their debut LP, Plays for Lovers, was released in 1985 on Dischord Records. Their follow-up was the six-song 1986 Need a Job EP, released on Olive Tree Records. Their final record, House Burning Down, was posthumously released in 1987 by Dischord Records. Both bands' Dischord releases were later combined on the 1992 compilation CD Plays For Lovers & House Burning Down. with two bonus tracks.

For Beefeater's second record, drummer Bruce Taylor was replaced by Mark "Two-Chair" Shellhaas, who in turn, would be substituted by Kenny Craun for the band's final album. After the breakup of Beefeater, Squip and Birdzell went on to form Fidelity Jones, while Craun joined the Rhythm Pigs, and Fred "Freak" Smith joined Strange Boutique.

While Beefeater's songs had all the angry energy of its hardcore labelmates the energy was channelled as much through funk and jazz as rock and roll. Dug E. Bird's fast-paced bass slap drives a rhythm section over which Fred "Not Sonic" Smith's guitar rides in a way reminiscent of the Minutemen. House Burning Down saw the incorporation of even more non-punk influences, most notably world music and included musical cameos by many of the Dischord Records regulars, including label head Ian MacKaye providing an intro to the album, in addition to some saxophone.

Squip's essay in Threat by Example: A Documentation of Inspiration (Martin Sprouse, editor, 1991 Pressure Drop Press: San Francisco, ISBN 0-9627091-1-5) outlines his notably religious world view and motivation, unusual for a Dischord band.

== Discography ==
- Plays for Lovers (1985 LP Dischord Records catalog No. 17) Bruce Atchley Taylor plays drums.
- Need a Job (1986 EP Olive Tree Records catalog No. 106) Mark Shellhaas plays drums.
- House Burning Down (1987 LP Dischord Records catalog No. 23) Kenny Craun plays drums.

== See also ==
- Revolution Summer
