= Subject to Change (EP) =

EP by The Faith
- Released: December 1983
- Recorded: May 1983
- Studio: Inner Ear Studios, Mastered at Masterdisk
- Genre: Hardcore punk; melodic hardcore
- Length: 12:52
- Label: Dischord
- Producer: Ian MacKaye, The Faith

The Faith chronology
Faith/Void Split (1982)	Subject to Change (1983)

Professional ratings
Review scores
Source	Rating
AllMusic	4/5 stars

Subject to Change is the first and only EP by American hardcore band The Faith. It was released in December 1983 through Dischord Records. It was released after the band had broken up.

== Track listing ==
All lyrics are written by The Faith; all music is composed by The Faith.

Side one
No.	Title	Length
1.	"Aware"	1:40
2.	"Say No More"	1:30
3.	"Limitations"	1:24
4.	"No Choice"	1:03

Side two
No.	Title	Length
1.	"Untitled"	1:07
2.	"Subject to Change"	1:33
3.	"More of the Same"	1:33
4.	"Slowdown"	2:58
Total length:		12:52

2011 Reissue – The Faith first demo
No.	Title	Length
1.	"You're X'd"	1:06
2.	"Don't Tell Me"	0:59
3.	"In The Black"	1:49
4.	"In Control"	1:07
5.	"It's Time"	0:59
6.	"Another victim"	0:43
7.	"Nightmare"	1:11
8.	"Trapped"	0:48
9.	"No Choice"	0:54
10.	"Confusion is the End"	1:42
11.	"What's Wrong With Me?"	0:44
Total length:		24:38

=== Notes ===
- Demos recorded in December 1981 at Inner Ear Studios.

== Personnel ==
=== The Faith ===
- Chris Bald – bass
- Ivor Hanson – drums
- Michael Hampton – guitars
- Eddie Janney – guitars
- Alec MacKaye – vocals

=== Production ===
- Ian MacKaye, The Faith – production
- Don Zientara – engineering
- Kim Gregg – photography [front cover]
- Tiffany Pruitt – photography [back cover]
- Amy Pickering, Leslie Clague, Susan Dynner – photography [insert]
- Glen E. Friedman – photography [label]
