= Michael Hampton (punk musician) =

American punk guitarist

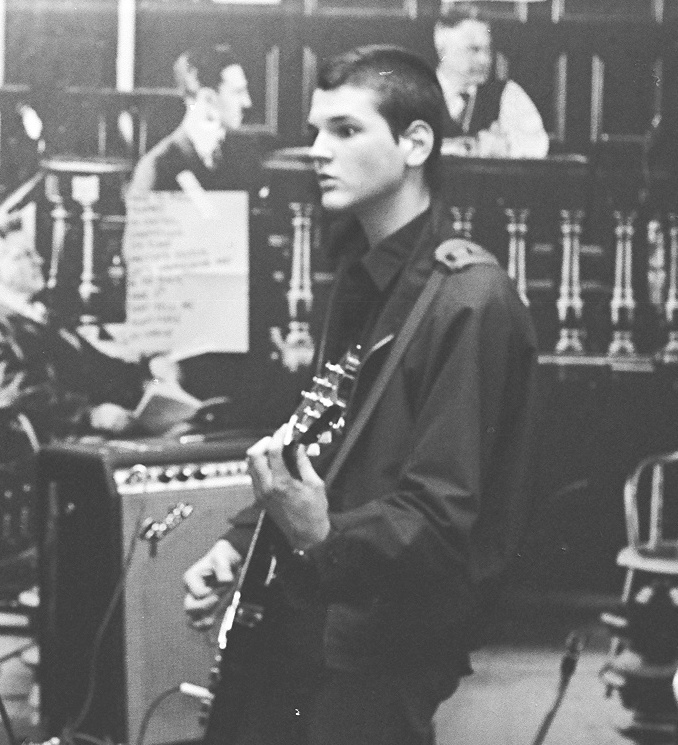
- Hampton performing with the Faith in 1982

Background information
- Origin: Washington, D.C., U.S.
- Genres: Hardcore punk; emo; post-hardcore
- Occupation: Musician
- Instrument: Guitar
- Years active: 1980–present
- Label: Dischord
- Formerly of: The Extorts; State of Alert; the Faith; Embrace; One Last Wish; the Snakes; Paco; Fake Names

Michael Hampton is a guitarist in the Washington, D.C., hardcore punk scene.

== Biography ==
His first notable effort was playing guitar in The Extorts in early 1980. There are a few live recordings and a demo tape as evidence of their existence. After The Extorts broke up, Hampton and Henry Garfield (later to become Henry Rollins) formed a new group called S.O.A. (State of Alert) and they released a 7" on Dischord records. When S.O.A. split up, Henry Garfield changed his surname to Rollins and moved to Los Angeles as singer of Black Flag.

Hampton then joined fellow D.C. punks Alec MacKaye (brother of Ian MacKaye), Eddie Janney, Chris Bald and Ivor Hanson and formed The Faith who released two recordings on the Dischord label - a split LP with VOID and the Subject to Change 12". This group broke up in 1983. Hampton soon joined Ian Mackaye, Ivor Hanson and Chris Bald in another D.C. group called Embrace. Along with Rites of Spring, Embrace is credited as a seminal emo group, however Ian Mackaye found the term "emocore" disgusting and did not accept the label. A posthumously released album appeared on Dischord in 1987, after they had split up.

Hampton then joined a short lived project called One Last Wish, composed of three ex members of Rites of Spring. This band lasted only a matter of months, but they had recorded one demo which was released some years later on Dischord.

Concurrent with One Last Wish, Hampton was involved in another project with Simon Jacobson called The Snakes. This group was primarily a recording project, and rarely played live. The Snakes released two albums on Dischord.

In 1990 Hampton teamed up with Ivor Hanson and Bert Queiroz to form Manifesto who were influenced by the British music of the time. They released one album and one 7" to critical acclaim in the UK, but records sales did not follow and soon Hampton's itchy feet made him leave. He has spent the years after producing soundtrack music for many TV programmes, video games and films.

Hampton was in Paco along with fellow members Dominique Durand, Andy Chase and Gary Maurer. This group released an album in May 2004 called This Is Where We Live on Unfiltered Records.

In 2018, Hampton founded a power-pop band, Fake Names, with Brian Baker, Johnny Temple, and Dennis Lyxzén. Brendan Canty later joined the lineup.
