= Gray Matter (band) =

American rock band

- Origin: Washington, D.C., U.S.
- Genres: Post-hardcore, emo, hardcore punk
- Years active: 1983–1986; 1990–1993; 2026-
- Label: Dischord
- Spinoff of: Iron Cross
- Past members: Dante Ferrando; Mark Haggerty; Steve Niles; Geoff Turner; Jon Kirschten

Gray Matter was an American post-hardcore band from Washington, D.C., United States, who played in the 1980s and 1990s. They disbanded in 1986, but reformed in 1990 before disbanding again in 1993.

== Biography ==
Gray Matter officially formed in the summer of 1983 from the remnants of several Washington, D.C. area punk bands. Geoff Turner, Mark Haggerty and Dante Ferrando had been playing in bands since their early junior high school days. In 1983, Ferrando and Haggerty were playing in Iron Cross, but when the band's image began to reflect its violent supporters more than the members themselves, Ferrando quit. Soon after Haggerty also left and the two reunited with Turner and Steve Niles and started playing shows around Washington D.C. as Gray Matter.

The band's first album, Food For Thought, was recorded at Inner Ear studio in November 1984 with Minor Threat's Ian Mackaye assisting with production. It was originally released on R&B Records in 1985, while the members were still in high school. In 1986, Dischord Records released the EP Take It Back. Shortly thereafter, Haggerty left the band to go to college. The remaining members briefly continued with Jon Kirschten, but split up in May 1986. Kirschten went on to form Rain, Ferrando went on to play drums for Ignition and Turner, Niles, and Haggerty reunited and formed the band Three, with Jeff Nelson from Minor Threat. Gray Matter reformed in the spring of 1990 and released a double seven inch in 1991 and the full-length, Thog, in 1992. The band officially disbanded in 1993.

Dischord originally re-issued Food For Thought and Take It Back (DIS 49) onto one CD in 1990.

=== Post-breakup ===
Niles later gained fame for writing horror comic books, in particular 30 Days of Night. Geoff Turner went on to found WGNS recording studios, and Dante Ferrando is the founder and owner of long running D.C. alternative and punk nightclub the Black Cat.

On September 21, 2003, the band reunited for a one off show to celebrate to 10th anniversary of the Black Cat. Subsequently, Gray Matter has performed at the Black Cat's 15th, 20th, 25th, and 30th anniversary shows.

=== Reunion and New Album ===
After 35 years, Gray Matter is back with Cathedral Hill, a new seven-song EP on Dischord Records.

The band has reunited every five years since 2003 to play the Black Cat's anniversary shows, and over the years they've gotten together at Geoff's house to work on new songs. In 2026, they headed into a couple of DC studios to finally record them.

The result is Cathedral Hill - anti-corruption rock, pro-labor sound, and a love letter to DC.

Listen to the first single, "Godot," today! Vinyl pre-orders begin next month, with the record arriving in late January.

== Influences ==
Gray Matter took influence from psychedelic rock and rock and roll, particularly Janis Joplin and the Rolling Stones and the Revolution Summer scene based around D.C.'s Food for Thought cafe.

== Members ==
- Geoff Turner - vocals, guitar
- Steve Niles - bass, vocals
- Dante Ferrando - drums
- Mark Haggerty - guitar (1983–1985, 1990–1993)
- Jon Kirschten - guitar (1985–1986)

== Discography ==
=== Albums ===
- Food for Thought (R&B Records 1985, Dischord Records 1990)
- Thog (Dischord Records 1992)

=== EPs and singles ===
- Take It Back 12-inch (Dischord Records 1986)
- 4 Songs 2×7″ (Dischord/WGNS Recordings 1991)
- Second Guess split 7-inch with Severin (Dischord/Superbad Records 1992)
- Godot (Dischord Records 2026)

=== Compilations ===
- Food for Thought/Take It Back (1990)

=== Compilation appearances ===
- Alive and Kicking 7-inch (WGNS Recordings 1985)
- 20 Years of Dischord (2002) - "Oscar's Eye"

=== Covers ===
- "I Am the Walrus" - The Beatles
- "I've Just Seen a Face" - The Beatles
