= Embrace (American band) =

American hardcore punk band (1985–1986)

- Embrace at Food for Thought in July 1985. From left to right are Chris Bald, Ian MacKaye, and Mike Hampton. The drummer, Ivor Hanson, is out of frame.

Background information
- Origin: Washington, D.C., U.S.
- Genres: Post-hardcore; emo; hardcore punk
- Years active: 1985–1986
- Label: Dischord
- Spinoffs: Fugazi
- Spinoff of: State of Alert, the Faith, Minor Threat
- Past members: Ian MacKaye; Michael Hampton; Chris Bald; Ivor Hanson

Embrace was a short-lived American hardcore band from Washington, D.C., active from the summer of 1985 to the spring of 1986. Along with Rites of Spring, and Beefeater, it was one of the mainstay acts of the 1985 Revolution Summer movement, and was one of the first bands to be dubbed in the press as emotional hardcore, though the members had rejected the term since its creation. The band included lead vocalist Ian MacKaye of the defunct hardcore punk act Minor Threat and three former members of his brother Alec's band, the Faith: guitarist Michael Hampton, drummer Ivor Hanson, and bassist Chris Bald.

== History ==
Hampton and Hanson had previously played together in S.O.A. The band played their first show on July 28, 1985, at Food for Thought, a former restaurant and music venue located on Washington, D.C.'s Dupont Circle; their ninth and final show was held at the 9:30 Club in March 1986. The only recording released by the quartet was their posthumous 1987 self-titled album, Embrace, being influenced by the Faith EP Subject to Change.

Following the breakup of Embrace, MacKaye and ex-Minor Threat drummer, Jeff Nelson, tried turning their recent one-off musical experiment in England, dubbed Egg Hunt, into an actual band, but the project never made it past the rehearsal stage. Hampton, for his part, teamed up with former members of Rites of Spring to form the short-lived post-hardcore outfit One Last Wish, while Bald moved on to the band Ignition. MacKaye eventually directed his energy and creativity toward the forming of Fugazi in 1987, and Ivor Hanson would pair up with Hampton again in 1988 for Manifesto.

During the band's formative years, some fans started referring to them and fellow innovators Rites of Spring as emocore (emotional hardcore) bands, a term MacKaye publicly disagreed with.

== Influences and legacy ==
Embrace cited influences including the English post-punk band Empire, the acid rock genre and the 1960s rock of the Zombies, Small Faces, the Who and the Beatles.

In 1994, a tribute album for Embrace, Land of Greed... World of Need, was released through Trustkill Records, featuring Avail, Rancid, and Lifetime, among others. The concept was that each band would cover one song from the band's sole album. The album was also a benefit for local homeless shelters.

== Discography ==
Albums

- Embrace (1987)

Compilation appearances

- 20 Years of Dischord (2002)

== See also ==
- Revolution Summer
