= Rites of Spring =

American hardcore punk band

- Rites of Spring members Guy Picciotto (left) and Mike Fellows (right) performing

Background information
- Origin: Washington, D.C., U.S.
- Genres: Hardcore punk; emo; punk rock; post-hardcore
- Years active: 1983–1986
- Label: Dischord
- Spinoffs: One Last Wish; Happy Go Licky; Fugazi
- Past members: Guy Picciotto; Edward Janney; Mike Fellows; Brendan Canty

Rites of Spring was an American punk rock band from Washington, D.C., formed in late 1983. Along with Embrace and Beefeater, they were one of the mainstay acts of the 1985 Revolution Summer movement which took place within the Washington, D.C. hardcore punk scene.

Musically, the band pushed the violence and passion of hardcore punk while experimenting with composition. The personal nature of their lyrics put them at the forefront of the emerging emo genre, though the band rejected the label.

The band only performed 19 shows, 16 in the DC area and 3 outside of DC. Vocalist/guitarist Guy Picciotto and drummer Brendan Canty went on to play in Fugazi with producer and former Minor Threat singer Ian MacKaye in the late 1980s, while bassist Mike Fellows formed Miighty Flashlight and has had a solo career.

== History ==
Picciotto, Canty, and Fellows had previously played together in the short-lived hardcore band Insurrection. The trio was joined by guitarist Eddie Janney—formerly of the Faith, Skewbald, and the Untouchables—and began writing music together in December 1983. The band finished several songs during this early period, like "All There Is", "End on End", and "By Design". The group made a demo recording at Inner Ear Studios in April 1984, but Fellows moved to California. "We thought he was leaving forever", Picciotto recalled. "And then we just kept practicing without him, hoping he'd come back. Lo and behold, three months later, he returned."

AllMusic's Matt Kantor described the band's music as being at times "fast and furious", while also being "at other times lush and evocative though always with a sense of drive and melody". Though rooted in the loud-and-fast style of hardcore punk, Rites of Spring is to be among the first bands who played music in the emotional hardcore genre, or what is now commonly and retrospectively called emo-core, a precursor of screamo. Jenny Toomey notes that, "Rites of Spring existed well before the term did and they hated it."

They were influenced by The Faith (Eddie Janney's previous band) and their 1983 EP Subject to Change with their introspective lyrics and angry, melody-tinged songwriting.

The band is named after the symphonic ballet The Rite of Spring by Igor Stravinsky. "We were reading about Stravinsky and the first [performance] where everybody beat each other on the head", Picciotto explained. "Whenever you fuck with someone musically and they take their music really serious, they're gonna fuck with you back." Picciotto also said the band chose the name to reflect their desire to revive the D.C. punk scene. "We were trying to create a rebirth of what's going on here", he said. "It seemed to be stagnating for a long time and we just thought the name kind of fit the way we felt, a springtime type thing."

=== Recordings ===
Rites of Spring was the band’s first album. Its twelve songs were recorded at Inner Ear Studios in February 1985, produced by Ian MacKaye of Fugazi and Minor Threat and Michael Hampton of The Faith and SOA. It was released on vinyl in June of that year as Dischord Records No. 16. The album was re-released on CD and cassette in 1987, with an additional track from the same session, "Other Way Around", as well as the four songs from the Rites' follow-up EP, All Through a Life, Dischord No. 22. The CD and cassette originally retained the number "16", while the 1991 repress, as well as the 2001 remastered version of the same seventeen songs, were numbered "16CD" and given the new title End on End. Their first demo of six songs was recorded in April 1984, almost a year before the sessions that became their debut album. It was released as a CD EP and 10" vinyl record in 2012 on Dischord Records with the catalog number 176. The band broke up in January 1986 soon after the sessions that produced the "All Through A Life" recording.

=== Post-breakup and musical influence ===
Picciotto, Janney and Canty formed One Last Wish with Embrace alumnus, guitarist Michael Hampton. They recorded one studio album, entitled 1986, which was released in 1999 due to the band breaking up after mixing was finished.

The Rites of Spring personnel reunited for a quasi-reincarnation called Happy Go Licky, releasing an LP/CD of various live concert recordings though never producing any studio work. The music was much more experimental than Rites of Spring, heavily improvised and featuring tape loop effects.

Picciotto and Canty eventually teamed up with bassist Joe Lally and former Minor Threat, Skewbald/Grand Union, Egg Hunt, and Embrace singer Ian MacKaye (co-owner of the band’s label, Dischord Records) in Fugazi. Mike Fellows went on to do session work for the Drag City label and form Miighty Flashlight, releasing an eponymous album under this name in 2002.

Dischord released the band's only demo, entitled Six Song Demo, in October 2012. All tracks on the demo were previously recorded versions of songs appearing on the Rites of Spring album.

== Musical style and legacy ==
Rites of Spring incorporated confessional lyrics into their hardcore punk style. According to Quinn Villarreal of SiriusXM, "Songwriting focus shifted from disdain and rage, to themes like relationships issues, trauma, and other hard to discuss topics."

The band cited influences including the Smiths, the Birthday Party, Buzzcocks, the Mob, the Fall, Television, Bob Dylan, the Saints, Wire, the Undertones and the Adverts.

Although Rites of Spring are regarded as having "unknowingly created and defined" the emo subgenre of hardcore punk, Picciotto himself has publicly rejected this notion. When asked about it in an interview his response was, "I've never recognized 'emo' as a genre of music. I always thought it was the most retarded term ever. I know there is this generic commonplace that every band that gets labeled with that term hates it. They feel scandalized by it. But honestly, I just thought that all the bands I played in were punk rock bands. The reason I think it's so stupid is that – what, like the Bad Brains weren't emotional? What – they were robots or something? It just doesn't make any sense to me."

They have been cited as an influence by Eddie Vedder of Pearl Jam.

== Members ==
- Guy Picciotto – guitar, vocals
- Edward Janney – guitar
- Mike Fellows – bass guitar
- Brendan Canty – drums, vocals

== Discography ==
=== Studio album ===
- Rites of Spring (1985)

=== EP ===
- All Through a Life (1987)

=== Compilation ===
- End on End (1991)

=== Demo ===
- Six Song Demo (2012, recorded in 1984)

== See also ==
- Revolution Summer
