= Happy Go Licky =

American post-hardcore band

- Origin: Washington, D.C., U.S.
- Genres: Post-hardcore
- Years active: 1987-1988
- Labels: Dischord; Peterbilt
- Past members: Guy Picciotto; Edward Janney; Mike Fellows; Brendan Canty

Happy Go Licky was an American post-hardcore band formed in the spring of 1987, and which broke up after their final show at Washington, D.C.'s 9:30 Club on New Year's Day in 1988. The group was a short-lived reunion of the renowned D.C. hardcore band Rites of Spring (active from 1984 to 1986).

Though comprising the same personnel as Rites of Spring (Eddie Janney and Guy Picciotto on guitar and vocals; Mike Fellows on bass and vocals; Brendan Canty on drums), their music was vastly different from their earlier incarnation. Happy Go Licky was far more experimental, often incorporating tape loops and sound effects into their live performances; additionally, their songs were often largely or entirely improvised, and featured unusual structures.

Their short life span did not allow Happy Go Licky to ever get into a recording studio; however some taped live performances were initially released in 1988 as a self-titled 12-inch on Picciotto's own Peterbilt Records. Later a larger selection of their performances was assembled and released on Dischord Records as Will Play (1997).
