= Alec MacKaye =

American singer and musician (born 1965)

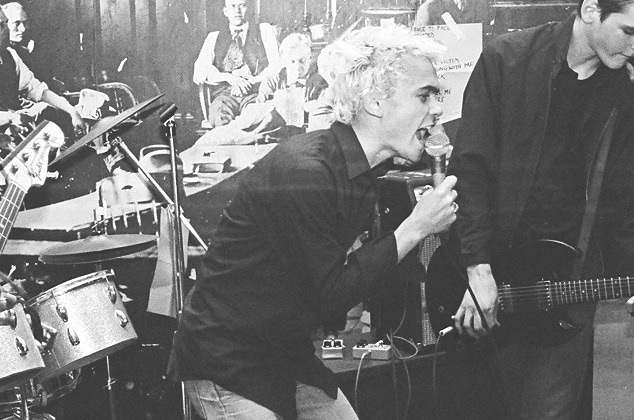

Background information
- Born: September 11, 1965 (age 60)
- Genres: Hardcore punk
- Occupations: Musician, singer, writer, painter
- Instruments: Vocals, guitar
- Years active: 1979-present
- Label: Dischord
- Formerly of: Untouchables; the Faith; Ignition; the Warmers; Hammered Hulls

Alec MacKaye (born September 11, 1965) is an American singer and musician best known as a member of the DC hardcore bands Untouchables and the Faith. In the mid-1990s Alec joined the band the Warmers as a vocalist and guitarist. He has also been a member of Ignition and Hammered Hulls. Mondo James Dean, an anthology of poetry and short-fiction edited by Richard Peabody and Lucinda Ebersole, was dedicated to MacKaye. In August 1985 he was briefly the vocalist of Bells Of, performing at the band's debut live show, but not continuing to their second.

== Personal life ==
MacKaye is the younger brother of Minor Threat & Fugazi singer and guitarist Ian MacKaye. His sister-in-law, Amy Farina was a member of The Warmers with Alec years prior to marrying his brother. He is shown on the cover of Minor Threat's self-titled EP, Minor Threat, and later the Complete Discography. He is also featured on the cover of the Teen Idles' Minor Disturbance EP. MacKaye is currently the Chief Preparator at The Phillips Collection in Washington, D.C.

== Filmography ==
Alec was interviewed in the documentary film Salad Days.
