= One Last Wish =

Short-lived post-hardcore band

- Origin: Washington, D.C., U.S.
- Genres: Post-hardcore; emo
- Years active: 1986–1987
- Label: Dischord
- Past members: Brendan Canty; Michael Hampton; Edward Janney; Guy Picciotto

One Last Wish was a short-lived post-hardcore band from Washington, D.C. It was formed in May 1986 by members of Rites of Spring and Embrace, and split up in January 1987.

== History ==
Amidst the breakup of Rites of Spring in 1986, three of its four members – Picciotto, Janney and Canty – formed the band, alongside Michael Hampton, former guitarist of the Faith and Embrace. With the name One Last Wish the band began playing shows in August 1986, which were mostly in the D.C. area and included a series of benefit shows.

Their sole recording was done in November 1986 at Inner Ear Studios in Arlington, Virginia. It was engineered by Don Zientara and produced by Ian MacKaye. One Last Wish broke up shortly after mixing was completed, and as a result the album was not released until much later. Dischord had decided against the release in light of their growing reputation as a label of defunct bands.

=== Post breakup ===
During 1987 and 1988, Picciotto, Janney and Canty reunited with Michael Fellows for a quasi reunion of Rites of Spring, taking on the new name Happy Go Licky.

Also in 1987, Canty joined Fugazi (that featured Ian McKaye and Joe Lally). Picciotto joined Fugazi later around 1988.

Hampton formed the band Manifesto in 1988.

One song, "Burning in the Undertow", was released on the Dischord benefit sampler "State of the Union" in April 1989.

Thirteen years after being recorded 1986 was finally released in November 1999, on MacKaye's Dischord Records label.

== Influence ==
Twenty years after the 1999 release of 1986 material, the song "My Better Half" was listed by Vulture.com as number 81 of the 100 greatest emo songs.

== Discography ==
- 1986 Dischord Records (1999)
