= The Faith (American band) =

American hardcore punk band (1981–1983)

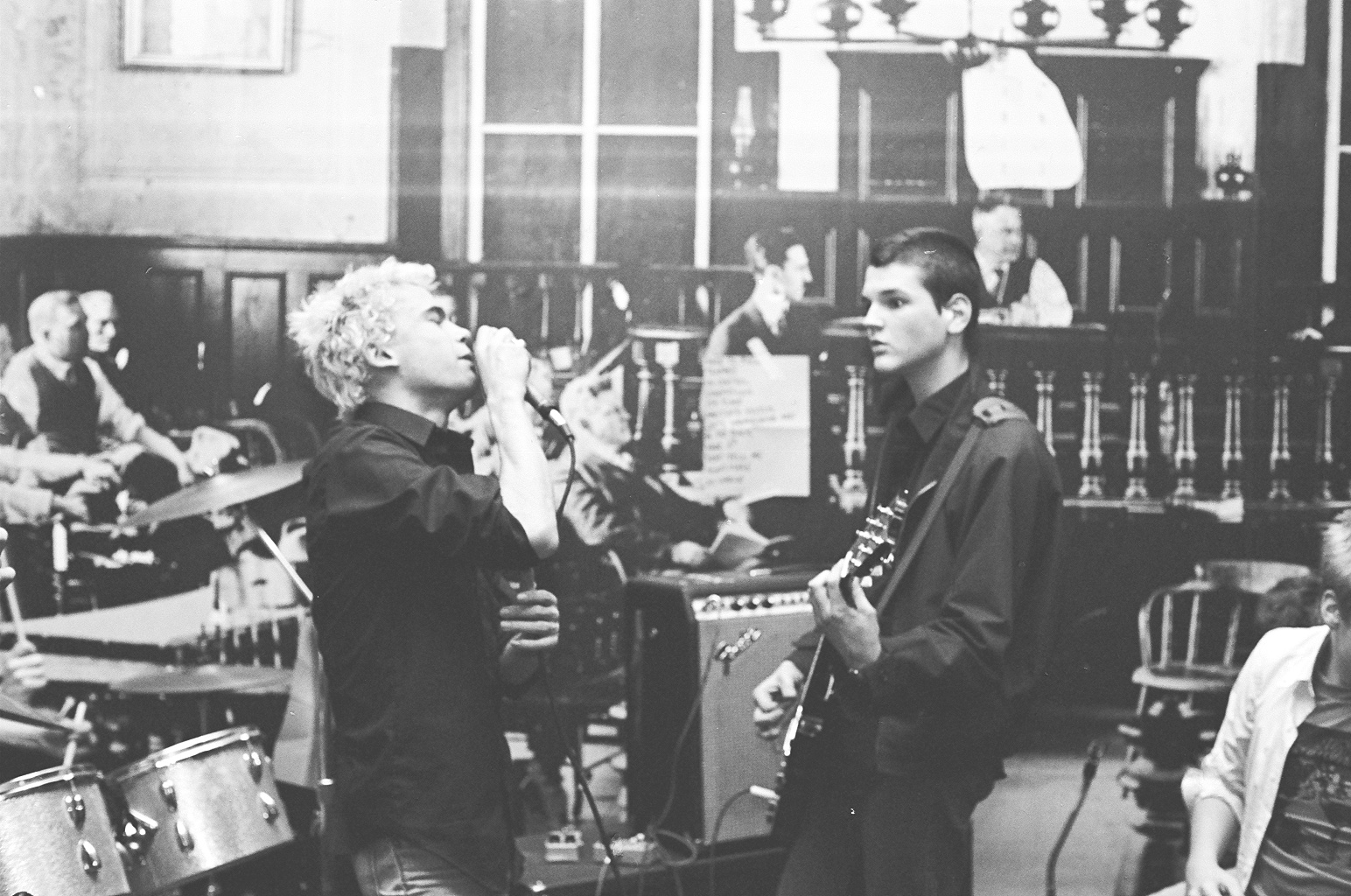
- Alec MacKaye and Michael Hampton of the Faith, The Chancery, Washington, D.C., 1981

Background information
- Origin: Washington, D.C., United States
- Genres: Hardcore punk; melodic hardcore; emo
- Years active: 1981–1983
- Label: Dischord
- Spinoffs: Rites of Spring, Embrace, One Last Wish, Happy Go Licky, The Warmers
- Spinoff of: Untouchables, State of Alert
- Past members: Alec MacKaye; Michael Hampton; Ivor Hanson; Chris Bald; Edward Janney

The Faith was an early American hardcore punk band, from Washington D.C., with strong connections to the scene centered on the Dischord label. Along with Minor Threat, the Faith were key players in the early development of hardcore, with a (later) melodic approach that would influence not just associated acts like Rites of Spring, Embrace and Fugazi, but also a subsequent generation of bands such as Nirvana, whose Kurt Cobain was a vocal fan.

== History ==
The band formed as a four-piece in the summer of 1981 and featured Alec MacKaye, former vocalist for the Untouchables, on vocals, Michael Hampton and Ivor Hanson of Henry Rollins' first band, State of Alert on guitar and drums respectively, as well as Chris Bald on bass. They called themselves the Faith and played their first show at H.B. Woodlawn High School in November 1981. Alec described the name as "a positive kind of sound, not negative like so many others". "We felt that (The) Faith was a stronger-than-macho name. We did want something more hopeful and less nihilistic, in spite of our chaotic and sometimes destructive approach to performance."

Filling part of the void left by Minor Threat's hiatus, the Faith quickly became one of the most popular bands in D.C. After recording a demo in December 1981, the band released a split LP with fellow D.C. hardcore band, Void. It was released by Dischord Records, a local independent label founded by MacKaye's elder brother Ian MacKaye and Jeff Nelson of Minor Threat. The first pressing of the record sold out in two weeks. It featured the song "You're X'd", which addressed the straight edge philosophy popularized by Minor Threat and S.O.A. And at the same time it was a strong critic to the people that did not take the straight edge movement seriously and only pretended to follow it in order to sympathise with other people. The Faith members stated that they felt rather frustrated and angry because "people tend to compare the two sides of the record which is sort of dumb, we would have reviewed it as two separate bands—not comparing—instead of saying 'Oh, Void is so crazy and the Faith is just boring typical hardcore'." "Our approaches to music were so different that there isn’t much point in comparing the two sides…they are never close enough to compare, only to contrast and to complement."

In 1983 the Faith released an eight-song twelve inch EP called Subject to Change. It was produced by Ian MacKaye and showed the band progressing into more melodic territory with the addition of a second guitarist. Edward Janney, formerly of the Untouchables and Ian MacKaye's short-lived Skewbald/Grand Union, joined the Faith at the end of 1982 to play second guitar and made his recorded debut. The addition was made because they wanted to get some more complex guitar ideas into the songs and soften the impact of guitar malfunctions, which were a constant threat during good shows. They also wanted a fuller sound and liked the way Eddie played.

The Faith was short lived; following the seminal split LP with Void, they played their last show in August 1983 and their EP was issued four months later. According to Ian, "People were very unhappy; they just loved that band."

After the Faith broke up, guitarist Eddie Janney formed Rites of Spring with Guy Picciotto; while Hampton, Bald, and Hanson went on to join Embrace with Ian MacKaye on vocals. When Embrace broke up in early 1986, Chris Bald rejoined Alec MacKaye in Ignition (with Alec on vocals); meanwhile, Janney reunited with Michael Hampton for One Last Wish following Rites of Spring's breakup (later reformed as Happy Go Licky). Finally, Hampton and Hanson reunited in Manifesto in 1991, while Alec MacKaye sang with the Warmers during the mid-'90s.

== Musical style ==
The Faith took hardcore punk to new places in the early 1980s. Even during their existence, their music hinted at what was to come, softening the standard-issue hardcore approach somewhat with better-developed melodies and a more inward-looking perspective. To be sure, it was high-energy, high-velocity punk, but its subtle deviations from the norm opened up new vistas for the D.C. scene.

They were influenced heavily by the first wave of US and UK punk rock. Though the sound of the late '70s can still be heard in their demos, the Faith are leaner, faster and more direct than their predecessors. Chris Bald would write most of the lyrics while Michael most of the music. Chris defined their lyrics as "very personal, all I can really write about is things that influence me in my life. Whatever influences our lives is what we write about." Reason for which they never really were interested in writing about politics as many other bands, if not all, were doing it.

Minor Threat's influence is apparent in tracks like "Face to Face," though the Faith developed a distinct musical identity. Vocalist Alec MacKaye's delivery conveyed a palpable intensity that differed from many hardcore contemporaries. His approach incorporated melodic elements into brief, high-energy songs while maintaining their aggressive core, and the band's slower compositions explored darker territory that distinguished them within the Washington D.C. scene..

By the time they recorded the Subject to Change EP – which was first released in late 1983, shortly after they disbanded – the Faith had adopted a more melodic and emotional approach, perhaps owing to the addition of a second guitar player. The two guitars together seem to chime, creating an unusual – for hardcore – sense of melody. And instead of employing hardcore's usual strangled bark, Alec MacKaye makes sure his words are clear and easy to discern: the Faith's musicality often trumps their rage.

== Legacy ==
The music the Faith created remain among the most acclaimed not just in D.C. hardcore, but with hardcore as a whole. After breaking up in 1983, the members from the Faith continued to shape the sound of D.C. punk in their later projects, such as Embrace and Rites of Spring. Though initially a typical aggressive, fast hardcore band in their early days, they would eventually help to pioneer melodic hardcore, going on to have a massive influence on both Punk Rock and Alternative Rock for decades to come.

Writing for the Guardian, Craig Finn of the Hold Steady referred to the Faith / Void Split as “one of the most vital hardcore records ever released” and continued: “It's a reminder of hardcore at its finest: angry and dangerous without being cartoonish”. The split is regarded as a hardcore classic, and the album has proven highly influential on the Punk-Metal crossover that would develop throughout the 1980s.

They have been cited as a favorite or an influence by Eddie Vedder of Pearl Jam, Thurston Moore of Sonic Youth and Kurt Cobain of Nirvana, who ranked their split album in his top 50 albums of all time. Moore would later comment, "At the time, I thought of them as the most potent distillation of what 'D.C. straightedge hardcore 1980' was all about, in a way, because they were the youngest."

== Band members ==
- Alec MacKaye – vocals (1981–1983)
- Michael Hampton – guitar (1981–1983)
- Edward Janney – guitar (1982–1983)
- Chris Bald – bass (1981–1983)
- Ivor Hanson – drums (1981–1983)

== Discography ==
=== Studio albums ===
- Faith / Void Split (Dischord, 1982)

=== EPs ===
- Subject to Change (Dischord, 1983)

=== Compilations appearances ===
- 20 Years of Dischord (2002) – "Subject to Change" and a demo version of "No Choice"

== See also ==
- List of hardcore punk bands
