= Dischord 1981: The Year in Seven Inches =

Compilation album by various artists
- Released: 1995
- Recorded: 1981
- Genre: hardcore punk
- Length: 53:59
- Language: English
- Label: Dischord

Dischord 1981: The Year in Seven Inches, also known as Four Old Seven Inches, is a compilation album comprising the six 7" records released by independent label Dischord Records in 1981, originally released on vinyl in October of 1984, re-released on vinyl in 2007, and released on CD in October of 1995.

== Track listing ==
The tracks on the album are as follows.

The Teen Idles: Minor Disturbance
No.	Title	Length
1.	"Teen Idles"	0:44
2.	"Sneakers"	1:28
3.	"Get Up and Go"	0:52
4.	"Deadhead"	1:21
5.	"Fleeting Fury"	1:20
6.	"Fiorucci Nightmare"	0:44
7.	"Getting in my Way"	1:04
8.	"Too Young to Rock"	2:04

State of Alert: No Policy
No.	Title	Length
9.	"Lost in Space"	0:43
10.	"Draw Blank"	0:36
11.	"Girl Problems"	0:48
12.	"Blackout"	0:44
13.	"Gate Crashers"	1:03
14.	"Warzone"	0:51
15.	"Riot"	0:41
16.	"Gang Fight"	0:59
17.	"Public Defender"	1:12
18.	"Gonna Hafta Fight"	0:43

Minor Threat: Minor Threat
No.	Title	Length
19.	"Filler"	1:32
20.	"I Don't Wanna Hear It"	1:13
21.	"Seeing Red"	1:03
22.	"Straight Edge"	0:45
23.	"Small Man, Big Mouth"	0:55
24.	"Screaming at a Wall"	1:31
25.	"Bottled Violence"	0:53
26.	"Minor Threat"	1:31

Government Issue: Legless Bull
No.	Title	Length
27.	"Religious Ripoff"	1:14
28.	"Fashionite"	0:37
29.	"Rock 'N' Roll Bullshit"	1:13
30.	"Anarchy Is Dead"	0:30
31.	"Sheer Terror"	1:28
32.	"Asshole"	1:08
33.	"Bored to Death"	0:57
34.	"No Rights"	0:48
35.	"I'm James Dean"	0:17
36.	"Cowboy Fashion"	0:44

Minor Threat: In My Eyes
No.	Title	Length
37.	"In My Eyes"	2:49
38.	"Out of Step (With the World)"	1:16
39.	"Guilty of Being White"	1:17
40.	"Steppin' Stone"	2:11

Youth Brigade: Possible
No.	Title	Length
41.	"It's About Time That We Had A Change"	1:18
42.	"Full Speed Ahead"	1:27
43.	"Point of View"	0:47
44.	"Barbed Wire"	1:42
45.	"Pay No Attention"	0:56
46.	"Wrong Decision"	1:32
47.	"No Song"	2:25
48.	"No Song II"	0:04
Total length:		53:59

== Personnel ==
The following personnel were featured in the albums:

=== Minor Disturbance (1–8) ===
- Nathan Strejcek – vocals
- Geordie Grindle – guitar
- Ian MacKaye – bass
- Jeff Nelson – drums

=== No Policy (9–18) ===
- Henry Garfield – vocals
- Michael Hampton – guitar
- Wendel Blow – bass
- Simon Jacobsen – drums

=== Minor Threat (19–26), In My Eyes (37–40) ===
- Ian MacKaye – vocals
- Lyle Preslar – guitar
- Brian Baker – bass
- Jeff Nelson – drums

=== Legless Bull (27–36) ===
- John Stabb – vocals
- John Barry – guitar
- Brian Gay – bass
- Marc Alberstadt – drums

=== Possible (41–48) ===
- Nathan Strejcek – vocals
- Tom Clinton – guitar
- Bert Queiroz – bass
- Danny Ingram – drums

=== Technical ===
- Skip Groff – mixer, producer
- Ian MacKaye – producer
- Don Zientara – engineer

=== Art ===
- Brian Gay – back cover, cover art
- Jeff Nelson – graphic design, liner notes
- Jay Rabinowitz, Susie Josephson – photography
- John Stabb – back cover
