= List of songs recorded by Minor Threat =

Below is a list of all songs that have been recorded by the Washington, DC-based hardcore punk band Minor Threat.

== List ==
Songs recorded by Minor Threat
Title	Release	Release Year	Note
12XU	Flex Your Head	1982	Song can also be found on the First Two Seven Inches and Complete Discography compilation albums. Cover of a Wire song.
Addams Family	Out of Step Outtakes	2023	Later used as a coda for Cashing In.
Asshole Dub	20 Years of Dischord	2002	Previously unreleased dub of a Government Issue song.
Betray	Out of Step	1983	Song can also be found on the Complete Discography compilation album.
Bottled Violence	Minor Threat	1981	Song can also be found on the First Two Seven Inches and Complete Discography compilation albums.
Bottled Violence (Demo)	First Demo Tape	2003	Previously unreleased demo.
Cashing In	Out of Step	1983	Song can also be found on the Complete Discography compilation album.
Filler	Minor Threat	1981	Song can also be found on the First Two Seven Inches and Complete Discography compilation albums.
Filler (Out of Step Outtake)	Out of Step Outtakes	2023	Re-recorded from the In My Eyes EP with two guitars seemingly just for fun.
Good Guys (Don't Wear White)	Salad Days	1985	Song can also be found on the Complete Discography compilation album. Cover of a The Standells song.
Guilty of Being White	In My Eyes	1982	Song can also be found on the First Two Seven Inches and Complete Discography compilation albums.
Guilty of Being White (Demo)	First Demo Tape	2003	Previously unreleased demo.
I Don't Wanna Hear It	Minor Threat	1981	Song can also be found on the First Two Seven Inches and Complete Discography compilation albums.
I Don't Wanna Hear It (Demo)	First Demo Tape	2003	Previously unreleased demo.
In My Eyes	In My Eyes	1982	Song can also be found on the First Two Seven Inches and Complete Discography compilation albums.
In My Eyes (Out of Step Outtake)	Out of Step Outtakes	2023	Re-recorded from the In My Eyes EP with two guitars seemingly just for fun.
It Follows	Out of Step	1983	Song can also be found on the Complete Discography compilation album.
Little Friend	Out of Step	1983	Song can also be found on the Complete Discography compilation album.
Look Back and Laugh	Out of Step	1983	Song can also be found on the Complete Discography compilation album.
Minor Threat	Minor Threat	1981	Song can also be found on the First Two Seven Inches and Complete Discography compilation albums.
Minor Threat (Demo)	First Demo Tape	2003	Previously unreleased demo.
No Reason	Out of Step	1983	Song can also be found on the Complete Discography compilation album.
Out of Step	Out of Step	1983	Song can also be found on the Complete Discography compilation album. Re-recorded from the In My Eyes EP.
Out of Step (With the World)	In My Eyes	1982	Song can also be found on the First Two Seven Inches and Complete Discography compilation albums.
Salad Days	Salad Days	1985	Song can also be found on the Complete Discography compilation album.
Screaming at a Wall	Minor Threat	1981	Song can also be found on the First Two Seven Inches and Complete Discography compilation albums.
Seeing Red	Minor Threat	1981	Song can also be found on the First Two Seven Inches and Complete Discography compilation albums.
Seeing Red (Demo)	First Demo Tape	2003	Previously unreleased demo.
Small Man, Big Mouth	Minor Threat	1981	Song can also be found on the First Two Seven Inches and Complete Discography compilation albums.
Small Man, Big Mouth (Demo)	First Demo Tape	2003	Previously unreleased demo.
Sob Story	Out of Step	1983	Song can also be found on the Complete Discography compilation album.
Stand Up	Flex Your Head	1982	Song can also be found on the First Two Seven Inches and Complete Discography compilation albums.
Stand Up (Demo)	First Demo Tape	2003	Previously unreleased demo.
Steppin' Stone	In My Eyes	1982	Song can also be found on the First Two Seven Inches and Complete Discography compilation albums. Cover of a The Monkees song.
Straight Edge	Minor Threat	1981	Song can also be found on the First Two Seven Inches and Complete Discography compilation albums.
Straight Edge (Demo)	First Demo Tape	2003	Previously unreleased demo.
Stumped	Salad Days	1985	Song can also be found on the Complete Discography compilation album.
Think Again	Out of Step	1983	Song can also be found on the Complete Discography compilation album.
Understand	20 Years of Dischord	2002	Previously unreleased demo

== Personnel ==
- Ian MacKaye – vocals
- Lyle Preslar – guitar
- Brian Baker – bass before Out of Step, second guitar for Out of Step
- Steve Hansgen – bass for Out of Step
- Jeff Nelson – drums
