= Youth Brigade (Washington, D.C., band) =

Punk rock band from Washington, D.C.

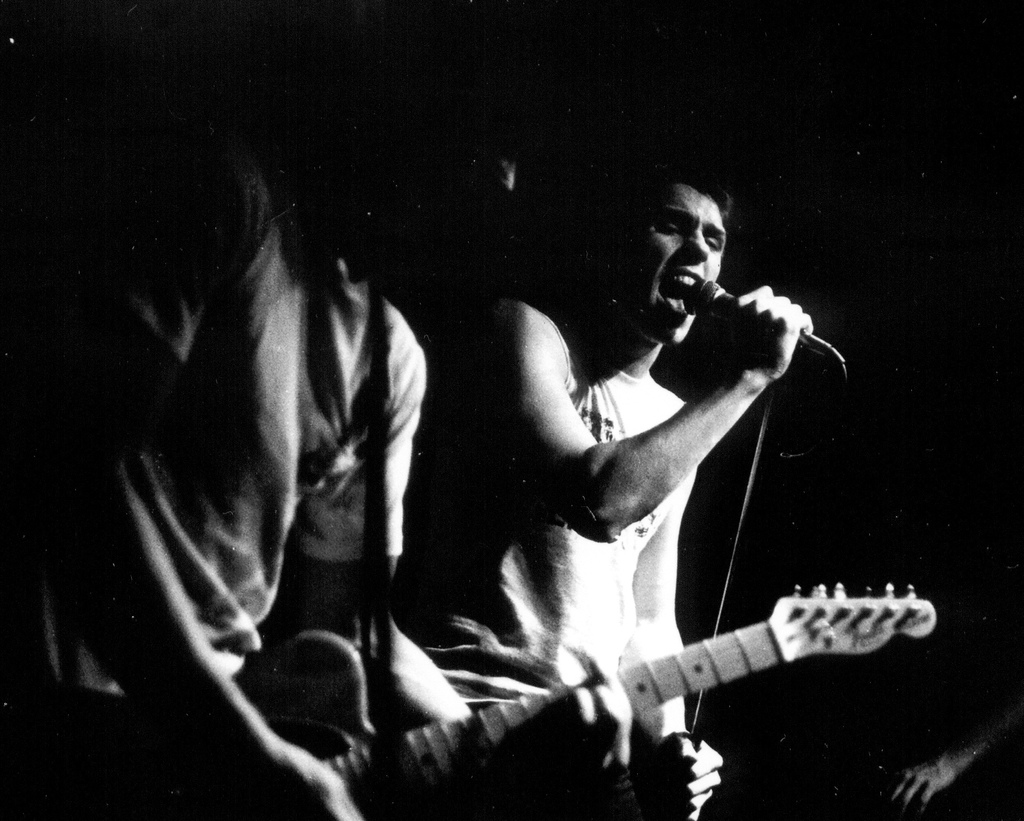
- Youth Brigade at 9:30 Club, Washington, D.C., 1981

Background information
- Origin: Washington, D.C.
- Genres: Hardcore punk
- Years active: 1980–1981, 2012–2013
- Label: Dischord
- Spinoff of: Teen Idles, Untouchables
- Past members: Nathan Strejcek; Danny Ingram; Greg; John Falls; Bert Queiroz; Tom Clinton; Steve Hansgen

Youth Brigade was an American hardcore punk band from Washington, D.C., formed in late 1980 and disbanded in 1981. They released the Possible EP and appeared on the Flex Your Head compilation, both on Dischord Records. Although active for less than a year, they were nevertheless contributors to the development of D.C. hardcore punk and have influenced many other bands. Several members briefly reunited for performances in 2012 and 2013.

== History ==
=== Formation and activity (1980–1981) ===
Nathan Strejcek of the Teen Idles and Danny Ingram of the Untouchables formed Youth Brigade in late 1980, shortly after the California punk band of the same name. The two were childhood friends and together attended Wilson High School along with Ian and Alec MacKaye, Bert Quieroz, Geordie Grindle, Jeff Nelson, and other future members of bands on Dischord, which Strejcek co-founded with Nelson and Ian MacKaye. Singer Strejcek and drummer Ingram initially played with a few different bassists and guitarists, including future Skewbald/Grand Union member John Falls on guitar. The Youth Brigade lineup was ultimately completed by Quieroz (also of The Untouchables) on bass and Tom Clinton on guitar.

The band debuted in March 1981 and played the first Black Flag show on the East Coast shortly thereafter. Youth Brigade embarked on an aborted tour with Minor Threat that ended when Clinton's mother demanded the return of their tour van, which she owned. They recorded a demo at Inner Ear Studios in mid-1981. Their only release during this era was the Possible 7-inch EP on Dischord. Its title was a tongue-in-cheek response to Dischord co-founders Ian MacKaye and Jeff Nelson, who promoted a "possible EP by Youth Brigade" in its upcoming releases within a label advertisement. They played their final show in December, and had three songs included on the Flex Your Head compilation released in January 1982.

=== Legacy and reunion ===
Though short-lived, the band is cited as an early influence on the development of hardcore punk in the United States and in Washington, D.C. more locally. Their scant recordings and appearance on the popular Flex Your Head compilation have helped them to continue to remain influential. Additionally, several band members went on to other notable projects. Queiroz was in the later Dischord bands Double-O (briefly alongside Clinton), Second Wind, and the post-hardcore band Rain. He also had a stint in The Meatmen. Ingram went on to play in the U.K. band Swervedriver, Strange Boutique, Emmapeel, and Dot Dash. Strejcek left Dischord and the hardcore music scene soon after the band's breakup. Strejcek eventually, however, returned to D.C.'s punk scene, co-founding the Delarcos in 2014. The group released the album Irradiate in 2023 through Dischord and Punkish Records.

On December 29, 2012, Strejcek, Ingram, and Quieroz reunited for a Youth Brigade show at the Washington, D.C. club The Black Cat, with Steve Hansgen (formerly of Minor Threat and Government Issue, and then a member of Ingram's group, Dot Dash) playing guitar. The show was a benefit for the D.C. hardcore documentary Salad Days and also featured Scream and Government Issue. That same foursome played a second show in February 2013 at the 9:30 Club as part of the "Punk-Funk Throwdown" series.

In 2015, Dischord issued the Youth Brigade demo recording as the Complete First Demo EP. Writing for Punknews.org, critic Alexander Lalama praised the record's raw musicianship and production, calling it a "gem" of a "historical document."

Michael Bishop of Gwar described Youth Brigade's "Barbed Wire" as "crucial," adding that it "sounded so distinct and brave. Drowning in delay and reverb. No one makes records like that, then or now."

== Members ==
- Nathan Strejcek – vocals (1980–1981, 2012–2013)
- Danny Ingram – drums (1980–1981, 2012–2013)
- John Falls – guitar (1980)
- Greg – bass (1980)
- Bert Queiroz – bass (1980–1981, 2012–2013)
- Tom Clinton – guitar (1980–1981)
- Steve Hansgen – guitar (2012–2013)

== Discography ==
Studio recordings

- Possible (EP) (Dischord Records, 1981)
- Complete First Demo (EP) (Dischord Records, 2015)

Compilations

- Flex Your Head (Dischord Records, 1982)
- The Year in 7″s (Dischord Records, 1984)
