= Pailhead =

American industrial band

- Origin: United States
- Genres: Industrial rock; industrial metal; post-punk; post-hardcore; hardcore punk
- Years active: 1987–1988
- Label: Wax Trax!
- Past members: Al Jourgensen; Ian MacKaye; Paul Barker; Bill Rieflin; Eric Spicer

Pailhead was an American industrial rock band founded in 1987. It was a short-lived side project of Al Jourgensen of Ministry that featured Dischord Records founder and former Minor Threat frontman Ian MacKaye on vocals. The band's sound was a combination of industrial beats and hardcore punk, presaging what Ministry would later do with Jello Biafra in another side project, Lard.

== Background ==
While Alain Jourgensen was living in London, he met Ian MacKaye. MacKaye had been in Washington D.C. punk bands The Teen Idles, Minor Threat, Skewbald/Grand Union, Egg Hunt and Embrace and was on the verge of forming Fugazi, while Jourgensen was taking his band Ministry into new territory—away from the more pop sound of With Sympathy and toward the harder sound of The Land of Rape and Honey. The two found common ground both musically and politically and decided to collaborate on a project that would fuse elements of industrial music with hardcore punk.

Pailhead released the single "I Will Refuse" / "No Bunny" (released in both 7" and 12" formats) in 1987 and the 4-song EP Trait in 1988, both on the Wax Trax! record label. The CD edition of Trait also incorporates both sides of the "I Will Refuse" / "No Bunny" single. The drummer for "No Bunny" was Eric Spicer of Naked Raygun. These tracks were later re-released on Ministry's odds-and-ends compilation Side Trax.

MacKaye stated on an episode of the Kreative Kontrol podcast that he has never played live with the band.

== In popular culture ==
- Chris Connelly's first work with Jourgensen was to record vocals for the track that would later emerge as "I Will Refuse." Connelly released this version, which he called "Stick" and attributed to the Revolting Cocks, on his Initials C.C. album. In his memoirs, he says he was not offended when MacKaye rerecorded the vocals with new lyrics, saying "It was an honor to be erased by Ian."
- The song "I Will Refuse" was used in the Zero Skateboards video Misled Youth (1999).
- In the game Mat Hoffman's Pro BMX, songs were also featured in the Streets on Fire skateboard video (Santa Cruz Skateboards). These songs included "Man Should Surrender", and "Don't Stand in Line".
- The song "I Will Refuse" was used in the premiere episode of Cold Case's fourth season, "Rampage".
- "I Will Refuse" was covered by Soulfly and featured as a bonus track on the Japanese edition of their album, 3.
- Spinnerette's cover version of "I Will Refuse" was released with their song "All Babes Are Wolves".

== Members ==
- Ian MacKaye: vocals
- Al Jourgensen: guitar, backing vocals
- Paul Barker: bass
- Bill Rieflin: drums
- Eric Spicer: drums

== Discography ==
- I Will Refuse" b/w "No Bunny 7" and 12" single (1987)
- "Man Should Surrender" b/w "Anthem" 7" single (1988)
- "Don't Stand in Line" b/w "Ballad" 7" single (1988)
- Trait 12" EP (comprising Pailhead's last two singles) and CD (made up of all 3 singles) (1988)
