= No Policy =

EP by State of Alert
- Released: March 1981
- Recorded: December 1980 – January 1981
- Studio: Inner Ear Studios, Arlington, Virginia
- Genre: Hardcore punk
- Length: 8:20
- Label: Dischord (No. 2)
- Producer: Skip Groff

State of Alert chronology
No Policy (1981)	First Demo 12/29/80 (2014)

Professional ratings
Review scores
Source	Rating
AllMusic	2.5/5 stars

No Policy is the debut studio EP by the American hardcore punk band State of Alert, the first band to be fronted by Henry Rollins. Consisting of ten tracks, it was recorded at Inner Ear Studios in Arlington, Virginia, produced by Skip Groff and engineered by Inner Ear owner Don Zientara. No Policy was released on Dischord Records in March 1981, as the label's second release. No Policy was financed by Rollins, as Dischord was tied up in releasing Minor Threat's debut EP.

== Track listing ==
All tracks are written by Henry Garfield and Michael Hampton, except where noted.

Side one
No.	Title	Length
1.	"Lost in Space"	0:43
2.	"Draw Blank" (written by Garfield, Hampton and Lyle Preslar)	0:36
3.	"Girl Problems"	0:48
4.	"Blackout" (written by Garfield and Simon Jacobsen)	0:45
5.	"Gate Crashers"	1:03

Side two
No.	Title	Length
6.	"Warzone"	0:51
7.	"Riot"	0:41
8.	"Gang Fight"	0:59
9.	"Public Defender"	1:12
10.	"Gonna Have to Fight" (written by Garfield and Jacobsen)	0:43
Total length:		8:20

== Personnel ==
- Henry Garfield – vocals
- Michael Hampton – guitar
- Wendel Blow – bass
- Simon Jacobsen – drums

Production

- Skip Groff – producer
- Don Zientara – engineer
- Tina Angelos – cover art
- Michael Hampton & Chris Edwards – sleeve

== Bibliography ==
- Azerrad, Michael (2001). Our Band Could Be Your Life: Scenes from the American Indie Underground, 1981–1991. Little, Brown and Company. ISBN 0-316-78753-1.
- Cogan, Brian (2008). The Encyclopedia of Punk. Sterling. ISBN 978-1-4027-5960-4.
