= Possible (EP) =

EP by Youth Brigade
- Released: December 1981
- Recorded: Summer 1981
- Studio: Inner Ear Studios
- Genre: Hardcore punk
- Length: 9:46
- Language: English
- Label: Dischord 006
- Producers: Youth Brigade, Don Zientara

Dischord Records chronology
In My Eyes (1981)	Possible (1981)	Flex Your Head (1982)

Possible is the debut release by the short-lived Washington, D.C., hardcore punk band Youth Brigade. It is a seven-inch EP released in December 1981 on Dischord Records and was recorded at Inner Ear Studios in Arlington, Virginia. The EP was produced and engineered by the notable producer Don Zientara.

In 1984, Possible was included by Dischord Records on the Four Old Seven-Inches compilation album, which gathered four early EPs released by the label. Alongside Possible were EPs by Minor Threat, Government Issue, and S.O.A. That compilation was subsequently reissued numerous times.

Michael Bishop of Gwar ranked Possible as his favorite D.C. punk release, describing the song "Barbed Wire" as "crucial," and noting that it "sounded so distinct and brave. Drowning in delay and reverb. No one makes records like that, then or now."

== Reception ==
Maximum Rocknroll gave Possible a favorable review, describing Youth Brigade as "a fantastic group with a chunkier sound and a slightly slower thrash attack than Minor Threat. 'Pay No Attention' is an awesome musical steamroller and this EP would be perfect if they'd included the classic 'I Object," but you can't expect everything."

Writing in OP Magazine, Steve Kiviat also reviewed Possible favorably. Kiviat described himself as "surprised" by the EP, and its "imaginative cuts 'Barbed Wire' and 'No Song.'" The former track is lauded for its "powerful echoed vocals and great, loud, sharp guitar," while the latter is described positively as "a slow, moody, anti-religious song which gets loud and fast for the final verses."

The Big Takeover also praised Possible as "great," noting that although Youth Brigade "aren't as a good as Minor Threat, [they continue] the D.C. tradition for hard records. 'It's About Time We Had a Change' is probably the best off their record."

Xiphoid Process, a punk fanzine from Austin, Texas, deemed Possible "classic D.C. stuff" with "all the D.C. early characteristics -- crude, but listenable production, eight songs, all fast."

== Track listing ==
All tracks are written by Youth Brigade.

No.	Title	Length
1.	"It's About Time That We Had a Change"	1:16
2.	"Full Speed Ahead"	1:22
3.	"Point of View"	0:46
4.	"Barbed Wire"	1:42
5.	"Pay No Attention"	0:55
6.	"Wrong Decision"	1:26
7.	"No Song"	2:18
8.	"No Song II"	0:01
Total length:		9:46

== Personnel ==
- Nathan Strejcek – vocals
- Tom Clinton – guitar
- Bert Queiroz – bass
- Danny Ingram – drums
- Lee Anderson, Jan Pumphrey – photography
- Don Zientara – producer, engineer
- Youth Brigade – producer
- John Eberle (J.E.) – masterer
