= Minor Threat Live =

Live album by Minor Threat
- Released: 1988
- Recorded: December 17, 1980; November 20, 1982; June 23, 1983
- Venues: DC Space; Buff Hall; 9:30 Club
- Genre: Hardcore punk
- Length: ~1:32:00
- Language: English
- Label: Dischord 027

Minor Threat chronology
Salad Days (1985)	Minor Threat Live (1988)	Complete Discography (1990)

Minor Threat Live is a live recording of three early shows played by Washington, DC hardcore punk band Minor Threat. This was released on VHS in 1988 under dis027.

== DC Space: The Unheard Music Festival (Washington, DC) ==
Tracks 1 through 6 were recorded on December 17, 1980 at The Unheard Music Festival, taking place only a month after their first show.

== Buff Hall (Camden, New Jersey) ==
Tracks 7 through 23 were recorded on November 20, 1982 at Buff Hall in Camden, New Jersey.

== 9:30 Club (Washington, DC) ==
Tracks 24 through 40 were recording on June 23, 1983 at the 9:30 Club in Washington, DC. During this show, Bad Brains singer H.R.'s sister came on stage and sang Filler with MacKaye.

== Track listing ==
All tracks are written by Minor Threat, except where noted.

DC Space
No.	Title	Writer(s)	Length
1.	"Minor Threat"
2.	"Stand Up"
3.	"Straight Edge"
4.	"Seeing Red"
5.	"Bottled Violence"
6.	"Steppin' Stone"	Tom Boyce, Bobby Hart

Buff Hall
No.	Title	Writer(s)	Length
7.	"Straight Edge"
8.	"Bottled Violence"
9.	"Sob Story"
10.	"No Reason"
11.	"12XU"	Wire
12.	"Small Man, Big Mouth"
13.	"Filler"
14.	"Out of Step"
15.	"Screaming at a Wall"
16.	"It Follows"
17.	"Steppin' Stone"	Tom Boyce, Bobby Hart
18.	"Little Friend"
19.	"Seeing Red"
20.	"Minor Threat"
21.	"I Don't Wanna Hear It"
22.	"Stand Up"
23.	"In My Eyes"

9:30 Club
No.	Title	Writer(s)	Length
24.	"Stand Up"
25.	"Seeing Red"
26.	"Little Friend"
27.	"Good Guys (Don't Wear White)"	Ed Cobb
28.	"Screaming at a Wall"
29.	"Betray"
30.	"In My Eyes"
31.	"Out of Step"
32.	"It Follows"
33.	"Think Again"
34.	"Small Man, Big Mouth"
35.	"I Don't Wanna Hear It"
36.	"Sob Story"
37.	"Filler"
38.	"Straight Edge"
39.	"No Reason"
40.	"Steppin' Stone"

No.	Title	Length
41.	"Q and A with MacKaye" (Interviewer unknown)
Total length:		~1:32:00
