= Complete Discography =

Compilation album by Minor Threat
- Released: January 1990
- Recorded: April 1981 – December 1983
- Genre: Hardcore punk
- Length: 47:10
- Label: Dischord
- Producer: Minor Threat

Minor Threat chronology
Minor Threat Live (1988)	Complete Discography (1990)	First Demo Tape (2003)

Professional ratings
Review scores
Source	Rating
AllMusic	5/5 stars
The Great Alternative & Indie Discography	8/10
Laut.de	5/5 stars
MusicHound Rock	4.5/5
The Rolling Stone Album Guide	5/5 stars
Spin Alternative Record Guide	10/10

Complete Discography is a compilation album by American hardcore punk band Minor Threat, released in 1989 through the band's own Dischord Records. As the name implies, it contains the band's entire discography at the time, including their three EPs, the Out of Step album and Flex Your Head compilation tracks. Some tracks were unreleased at the time and didn't appear on this compilation, but were later released. This includes the songs "Understand" and "Asshole Dub" from 20 Years of Dischord.

The album's cover artwork is very similar to that of Minor Threat, featuring the same photo of singer Ian MacKaye's younger brother, Alec MacKaye. The album was released with the cover in multiple colors, including red and green and a 2003 remastered version in blue and yellow.

In 2018, Pitchfork ranked it the 23rd best album of the 1980s, while LA Weekly ranked it the 2nd best hardcore punk album of all time in 2013. The latter's Patrick James wrote: "Sure, it's not technically an album, but there is nonetheless no better introduction to the genre of hardcore than Minor Threat's Complete Discography. [...] That Minor Threat's entire body of work fits on one CD doesn't diminish its significance; even today, it's still perfectly out of step (with the world)." In 2026, Rolling Stone dubbed it the 22nd best punk album of all time.

== Track listing ==
All tracks are written by Minor Threat, except where noted.

No.	Title	Original release	Length
1.	"Filler"	Minor Threat	1:32
2.	"I Don't Wanna Hear It"	Minor Threat	1:13
3.	"Seeing Red"	Minor Threat	1:02
4.	"Straight Edge"	Minor Threat	0:45
5.	"Small Man, Big Mouth"	Minor Threat	0:55
6.	"Screaming at a Wall"	Minor Threat	1:31
7.	"Bottled Violence"	Minor Threat	0:53
8.	"Minor Threat"	Minor Threat	1:27
9.	"Stand Up"	Flex Your Head	0:53
10.	"12XU" (originally performed by Wire)	Flex Your Head	1:03
11.	"In My Eyes"	In My Eyes	2:49
12.	"Out of Step"	In My Eyes	1:16
13.	"Guilty of Being White"	In My Eyes	1:18
14.	"Steppin' Stone" (originally performed by Paul Revere and the Raiders)	In My Eyes	2:12
15.	"Betray"	Out of Step	3:02
16.	"It Follows"	Out of Step	1:50
17.	"Think Again"	Out of Step	2:18
18.	"Look Back and Laugh"	Out of Step	3:16
19.	"Sob Story"	Out of Step	1:50
20.	"No Reason"	Out of Step	1:57
21.	"Little Friend"	Out of Step	2:18
22.	"Out of Step"	Out of Step	1:20
23.	"Cashing In"	Out of Step	3:44
24.	"Stumped"	Salad Days	1:55
25.	"Good Guys (Don't Wear White)" (originally performed by The Standells)	Salad Days	2:14
26.	"Salad Days"	Salad Days	2:46
Total length:			47:10

== Personnel ==
- Ian MacKaye – vocals
- Lyle Preslar – guitar
- Brian Baker – bass guitar on tracks 1–14 and 24–26, guitar on tracks 15–23
- Steve Hansgen – bass guitar on tracks 15–23
- Jeff Nelson – drums
- Cynthia Connolly – drawing
- Glen E. Friedman – photography
- Skip Groff – mixing
- Susie Josephson – photography
- Minor Threat – producing, mixing
- Tomas Squip – photography
- Don Zientara – engineer
