= I Need That Record! =

- Film poster
- Directed by: Brendan Toller
- Cinematography: Brendan Toller
- Edited by: Brendan Toller
- Distributed by: Music Video Distributors
- Release date: May 3, 2008
- Country: United States
- Language: English

I Need That Record! The Death (or Possible Survival) of the Independent Record Store is 2008 documentary film directed by Brendan Toller and distributed by Music Video Distributors. The project began as Toller's undergraduate thesis at Hampshire College in Amherst, MA.

== Interviews ==
The film features interviews with: Thurston Moore of Sonic Youth, Ian MacKaye of Dischord Records Fugazi/Minor Threat, activist/author Noam Chomsky, Mike Watt of the Minutemen, Lenny Kaye guitarist of the Patti Smith Group, Chris Frantz of Talking Heads/Tom Tom Club, guitar composer Glenn Branca, Patterson Hood of Drive-By Truckers, Patrick Carney of the Black Keys, punk author Legs McNeil, rock photographer Bob Gruen, BP Helium guitarist from Of Montreal and more.

== Release ==
I Need That Record! premiered at Hampshire College on May 3, 2008. It sold out at the National Film Board of Canada and won the Audience Award at Melbourne International Film Festival. I Need That Record! played around the world at over 60 film festivals, centers, and events (Melbourne International Film Festival, Independent Film Festival of Boston, Raindance UK). After being released to independent record stores on Record Store Day, it was sold at bigger chains on July 27, 2010.

== Reception ==
Jonathan Perry of the Boston Globe has described the film as "an elegy for a vanishing subculture...a lively, bittersweet film that examines - with caustic humor, brutal candor, and, ultimately, great affection - why roughly 3,000 indie record stores have closed across the nation over the past decade." Rob Young of Uncut called it a "a rounded and quietly impassioned elegy" for the communities that surrounded independent music stores. Keith Carman of Exclaim! wrote, "However, while I Need That Record is interesting and well laid out enough to be worth a viewing, it's not exactly an epiphany." Daryl Loomis of DVD Verdict described it as "overly wistful" but "definitely worth a watch".
