= Salad Days (EP) =

EP by Minor Threat
- Released: April 1, 1985
- Recorded: December 14, 1983 at Inner Ear Studios in Arlington, Virginia
- Genre: Hardcore punk
- Length: 7:02
- Label: Dischord
- Producers: Skip Groff and Minor Threat

Minor Threat chronology
First Two Seven Inches (1984)	Salad Days (1985)	Minor Threat Live (1988)

Professional ratings
Review scores
Source	Rating
Allmusic	3/5 stars
Rolling Stone	3/5 stars

Salad Days is the final EP by American hardcore punk band Minor Threat, released in July 1985 (two years after the band's breakup) through Dischord Records, with the catalog number DIS015. The EP differs somewhat from the band's previous material. All songs are slower, making a slight departure from the group's hardcore punk style. Tracks "Good Guys" (a remake of The Standells' song "Sometimes Good Guys Don't Wear White") and "Salad Days" both feature an acoustic guitar, and "Salad Days" also has chimes. Like many of Minor Threat's recordings, Salad Days has never been released on CD, but all the songs are available on their 1989 compilation album Complete Discography.

== Track listing ==
No.	Title	Writer(s)	Length
1.	"Stumped"	Minor Threat	1:53
2.	"Good Guys (Don't Wear White)" (originally performed by The Standells)	Ed Cobb	2:22
3.	"Salad Days"	Ian MacKaye	2:46
Total length:			7:01

== Personnel ==
- Ian MacKaye – vocals
- Lyle Preslar – guitars
- Brian Baker – bass
- Jeff Nelson – drums

Production

- Skip Groff; Minor Threat – production
- Don Zientara – engineer, mixing
- Glen E. Friedman – cover photography
- Cynthia Connolly, Glen E. Friedman, Doug Humiski, Jim Saah, Tomas Squip – photography
- Jeff Nelson – graphic design

== Charts ==
Chart (1985)	Peak position
UK Indie Chart	20
