= First Demo Tape =

Compilation album by Minor Threat
- Released: 2003
- Recorded: February 1981 at Inner Ear Studios in Arlington, Virginia
- Studio: Inner Ear Studios
- Genre: Hardcore punk
- Length: 8:55
- Label: Dischord
- Producers: Skip Groff, Minor Threat

Minor Threat chronology
| Complete Discography (1990) | First Demo Tape (2003) | Out of Step Outtakes (2023) |

First Demo Tape is a compilation EP by the American hardcore punk band Minor Threat. It was released on CD and 7-inch vinyl in 2003 through Dischord Records. An archival release of recordings, the EP comprises previously unreleased demo versions of material which appears on the band's subsequent recordings.

Professional ratings
Review scores
| Source | Rating |
|---|---|
| Pitchfork | (7.5/10) |
| AllMusic | 4/5 stars |

== Track listing ==
All tracks are written by Minor Threat.

| No. | Title | Length |
|---|---|---|
| 1. | "Minor Threat" (Demo) | 1:36 |
| 2. | "Stand Up" (Demo) | 0:49 |
| 3. | "Seeing Red" (Demo) | 1:02 |
| 4. | "Bottled Violence" (Demo) | 0:56 |
| 5. | "Small Man, Big Mouth" (Demo) | 0:59 |
| 6. | "Straight Edge" (Demo) | 0:48 |
| 7. | "Guilty of Being White" (Demo) | 1:18 |
| 8. | "I Don't Wanna Hear It" (Demo) | 1:27 |
| Total length: | | 8:55 |

== Personnel ==
- Ian MacKaye – lead vocals
- Lyle Preslar – guitar
- Brian Baker – bass guitar
- Jeff Nelson – drums
- Henry Garfield – backing vocals
