= Teen Idles (EP) =

Anniversary

EP by The Teen Idles
- Released: October 28, 1996
- Recorded: February and April 1980
- Genre: Hardcore punk
- Length: 9:50
- Label: Dischord

The Teen Idles chronology
Minor Disturbance EP (1980)	Anniversary (1996)

Professional ratings
Review scores
Source	Rating
AllMusic	4/5 stars

Anniversary is an EP by the hardcore punk band the Teen Idles. It was released in 1996 on Dischord Records to commemorate the label's 100th release. The EP contains material from the two demo sessions the band recorded in February and April 1980. Tracks 1 and 3 were written by the Slinkees, the original name of the band before Nathan Strejcek joined on vocals.

Writing for AllMusic, critic Jack Rabid said, "This is Teen Idles as a punk band, at merely really fast tempos, before they opted for the blinding thrash rush that led to such speeds becoming the stupid staple of hardcore...Like their then-D.C. friends the Bad Brains, only half as good, Teen Idles were actually a budding punk pleasure in their pre-hardcore days".

== Track listing ==
1. "Adventure" – 2:26
2. "Teen Idols" – 1:11
3. "Sneakers" – 1:39
4. "Trans Am" – 2:12
5. "Fiorucci Nightmare/Getting in My Way" – 2:18

== Personnel ==
- Nathan Strejcek − vocals
- Geordie Grindle − guitar
- Ian MacKaye − bass
- Jeff Nelson − drums
