= Me and You (Egg Hunt song) =

Single by Egg Hunt
- B-side: "We All Fall Down" (2:49)
- Released: October 1986
- Recorded: March 27, 28 and 30, 1986
- Studio: Southern
- Genre: Post-hardcore
- Length: 3:48
- Label: Dischord
- Songwriter: Ian MacKaye
- Producer: Egg Hunt

Professional ratings
Review scores
Source	Rating
AllMusic	3/5 stars

The single play record "Me and You", also known as Egg Hunt, and 2 Songs, is the first and only stand-alone release by the American experimental post-hardcore duo Egg Hunt.

== Overview ==
Egg Hunt's only output, a piece of "experimental, post-hardcore" music, is notable for its B-side, "We All Fall Down", a "post-punk melodic masterpiece" whose lyrics are a heartfelt and bitter reflection on the demise of Washington, D.C.'s 1985 Revolution Summer:

In search of the quiet life
We all fall down
In search of the righteous life
We all fall down

—Embrace, final lines of "We All Fall Down"

The song was originally written by Ian MacKaye for his band Embrace, whose other members rejected it. (Note: "They thought it sounded like Led Zeppelin," MacKaye said wryly.)

Although seemingly a small release in comparison to Dischord's significant catalog, this record is still a notable sample of MacKaye and Jeff Nelson's songwriting abilities, as well as their chemistry together as artists.

The single features MacKaye's recording debut as a guitarist and his final collaboration with Nelson.

== Background ==
=== Egg Hunt ===
Egg Hunt
- Future Egg Hunt members at Dischord Records ca. 1983. From left to right, Ian MacKaye and Jeff Nelson.

Background information
- Origin: Washington, DC, US
- Genres: Post-hardcore
- Years active: 1986
- Label: Dischord
- Past members: Ian MacKaye; Jeff Nelson
- Website: dischord.com/band/egg-hunt

Egg Hunt was a one-off musical experiment of long time friends and musicians Ian MacKaye and Jeff Nelson, former singer and drummer, respectively, of the hardcore punk band Minor Threat, and Dischord Records label co-founders.

In the spring of 1986, during a MacKaye and Nelson trip to London, England to discuss possible European distribution of Dischord releases with local company Southern Record Distributors, its owner, John Loder, invited them to do, just for fun, some recording while they were there. They recorded four songs in three days, and they liked the results so much that they decided to release a two-song single record to commemorate the occasion. They called it "Egg Hunt", since it was recorded over Easter weekend.

Just after returning to Washington, D.C., MacKaye's then band, Embrace, was suddenly and unexpectedly dissolved, so he and Nelson tried turning their experiment in the United Kingdom into an actual band. They recruited former Gray Matter members Steve Niles and Geoff Turner, but the project never surpassed the rehearsal stage and MacKaye decided to leave. However, Nelson, Turner, and Niles stayed together and soon invited former Gray Matter guitarist Mark Haggerty to join them to form the Dischord band Three in the summer of 1986. For his part, MacKaye eventually directed his energy and creativity toward the forming of Fugazi in 1987.

The Southern session ended up being the last time MacKaye and Nelson would record together.

== Production and release ==
"Me and You" was recorded with engineer John Loder at Southern Studios in London, England, on March 27, 28 and 30, 1986. It was released on Dischord Records in October 1986, in 7-inch vinyl disc format. (Note: Dischord #DIS 20V)

=== Reissues ===
"Me and You" was reissued by Dischord as a CD single (Note: Dischord #DIS 20CD) on June 16, 1997.

In 2002, the song "We All Fall Down" was featured on the 3-CD compilation box set 20 Years of Dischord. (Note: Dischord #DIS 125)

On September 27, 2011, Dischord re-released the single on light blue vinyl.

Upon making an account on dischord.com, a MP3 download of the single is given as a free gift.

== Track listing ==
All tracks are written by Ian MacKaye

Side A
No.	Title	Length
1.	"Me and You"	3:48

Side B
No.	Title	Length
1.	"We All Fall Down"	2:49
Total length:		6:37

== Personnel ==
Egg Hunt

- Ian MacKaye – vocals, guitar, bass
- Jeff Nelson – drums, backing vocals

=== Additional performers ===
- Tasha Loder – backing vocals (track A1)
- Tos Nieuwenhuizen – backing vocals (A1)

=== Production ===
- Egghunt – production
- Mr. John Loder – engineering
- Jeff Nelson (credited as Drive-Thru Nelson) – graphic design, photography (front cover)
- Tomas Squip – photography (back cover)
- Kurt Sayenga – typography

== See also ==
- List of Dischord Records bands
