= Marginal Man =

American hardcore punk band

- Origin: Washington, D.C., United States
- Genres: Hardcore punk
- Years active: 1982–1988; 1991, 1995, 2011 (reunions)
- Labels: Dischord, Gasatanka, Enigma, Giant
- Past members: Steve Polcari; Pete Murray; Mike Manos; Andre Lee; Kenny Inouye

Marginal Man was an American hardcore punk band from Washington, D.C., that formed in 1982. Three of its members—Steve Polcari (vocals), Pete Murray (guitar), and Mike Manos (drums)—had previously played together in the Bethesda, Maryland hardcore band Artificial Peace, a notable part of D.C.'s early hardcore scene, appearing on Dischord Records' "landmark" Flex Your Head compilation. After Artificial Peace disbanded, the trio would join up with Andre Lee (bass) and Kenny Inouye (guitar) to form Marginal Man. The band's first performance occurred on November 19, 1982 at a basement show with Scream, Insurrection, Double-O, United Mutation, and others. According to Polcari, the name 'Marginal Man' referred to the concept of "having friends in two or more groups, but not being part of any individual group. Kind of like 'outside looking in.'"

Marginal Man was one of the first D.C. hardcore bands, in addition to The Faith and Minor Threat, to feature two guitars. According to Minor Threat drummer and Dischord Records co-founder Jeff Nelson, "Marginal Man made the best use of two guitars of all the bands in D.C." The band toured and recorded frequently before giving a "final" performance at the 9:30 Club on March 24, 1988. The band subsequently reunited for several shows—the 9:30 Club on August 29, 1991 and December 30, 1995 (the second-to-last show at the 9:30 Club's original location) and at the Black Cat on August 20, 2011.

Guitarist Kenny Inouye is the son of the late former Representative, Senator, and Medal of Honor recipient Daniel Inouye, D-Hawaii.

== Discography ==
=== Releases ===
- Identity 12" EP (Dischord Records, 1984)/CD EP (Dischord, 1997)
- Double Image LP (Gasatanka/Enigma Records, 1985)/CD (In Your Eye, 2000)
- Marginal Man LP/CS (Giant Records, 1988)

=== Appearances ===
- "Marginal Man" on the "Alive And Kicking" 7" compilation (WGNS Recordings, 1985)
- "Stones Of A Wall" on the "State Of The Union" LP compilation (Dischord, 1989)
- "Friends" on the "Going Nowhere Slow" LP compilation (Double A Records, 1990)
- "Mainstream" and "Tell Me" on the "...And The Fun Just Never Ends" CD compilation (Lost And Found Records, 1993)
- "Missing Rungs" and "Manipulator" on the "20 Years Of Dischord" 3xCD compilation (Dischord, 2003)

== Members ==
- Steve Polcari - Vocals
- Pete Murray - Guitar, Vocals
- Kenny Inouye - Guitar
- Andre Lee - Bass
- Mike Manos - Drums
