= Egg Hunt =

EP by Egg Hunt
- Released: October 1986
- Recorded: March 1986
- Genre: Post-hardcore

Egg Hunt was a one-off band/project of longtime friends and musicians Ian MacKaye and Jeff Nelson, former singer and drummer, respectively, of the hardcore punk band Minor Threat. During a 1986 trip to England's Southern Studios to discuss European distribution of Dischord releases with owner John Loder, MacKaye and Nelson "decided to fuck around in the studio," according to MacKaye. The project was dubbed "Egg Hunt" due to the recording session occurring over Easter weekend on March 27, 28, and 30. Loder produced the recordings, while MacKaye and Nelson performed the music.

Egg Hunt's only release, a self-titled 7-inch, was, according to retrospective review by Ron DePasquale, an example of "experimental, post-hardcore" music. "We All Fall Down," appearing on the second side, was originally written by MacKaye for his earlier band, Embrace, but it was rejected by other band members. Although seemingly a small release in comparison to Dischord's significant catalog, this record is still a notable example of MacKaye and Nelson's songwriting abilities, as well as their chemistry together as artists.

MacKaye and Nelson tried turning Egg Hunt into an actual band after returning to Washington, DC. They recruited former Gray Matter members Steve Niles and Geoff Turner, but MacKaye's energy and creativity were soon directed toward the forming of Fugazi, while Nelson, Turner, Niles, and former Gray Matter guitarist Mark Haggerty started the Dischord band, Three.

== Track listing ==
All tracks are written by Ian MacKaye.

Side A
| No. | Title | Length |
|---|---|---|
| 1. | "Me and You" | 3:48 |

Side B
| No. | Title | Length |
|---|---|---|
| 1. | "We All Fall Down" | 2:48 |
| Total length: | | 6:36 |

== See also ==
- List of Dischord Records bands
