= Minor Disturbance =

EP by The Teen Idles
- Released: December 1980
- Recorded: September 1980 at Inner Ear Studios in Arlington, Virginia
- Studio: Inner Ear Studios, Arlington, Virginia
- Genre: Hardcore punk
- Length: 9:20
- Language: English
- Label: Dischord 001
- Producer: Skip Groff

The Teen Idles chronology
Minor Disturbance (1980)	Anniversary (1996)

Minor Disturbance is the debut EP by the American hardcore punk band the Teen Idles, released in December 1980. It was the first release by Dischord Records. Comprising eight songs, Minor Disturbance referenced a number of issues pertinent to the band, from being turned away at local concerts due to their age ("Too Young to Rock") to what they felt was the increasing complacency of many first wave punk bands ("Fleeting Fury"). Upon its release, Minor Disturbance received positive reviews from local fanzines and gained airplay on local radio stations.

== Background ==
The Teen Idles were a Washington, D.C. hardcore band that formed in 1979. Comprising vocalist Nathan Strejcek, guitarist Geordie Grindle, bassist Ian MacKaye and drummer Jeff Nelson, the band evolved out of the Slinkees. After original vocalist Mark Sullivan left for college, the Slinkees first tried to recruit Henry Garfield (later Rollins) before Strejcek joined. After renaming themselves the Teen Idles, the band toured locally; they played at a range of venues, including opening for Bad Brains at an art gallery called Madam's Organ.

The Teen Idles recorded two demo sessions at a local studio in February and April 1980, despite the engineer and a visiting band openly laughing as they recorded. They chose not to release the recordings, and instead embarked on a tour of the West Coast in August 1980. Upon their return to Washington D.C., the Teen Idles met Skip Groff, owner of the record store Yesterday and Today, to discuss a studio recording of their songs.

== Recording and production ==
The group entered Inner Ear Studios in September 1980 to record a number of songs, with owner Don Zientara engineering and Groff producing. Inner Ear was merely Zientara's house; he owned a four-track recorder and some home-made gear. The mixing board was on the porch, and was connected to the basement of the house where the band played. Zientara later noted that "everything was held together with clothespins". Inner Ear was useful to the Teen Idles, as at the time there were few options available to an American independent band between recording on a boombox or at a professional studio.

Zientara, a folk music enthusiast, usually engineered recordings of Celtic folk and harp music and was about 14 years older than the Teen Idles, yet appreciated their recording zeal. He later commented: "It was them against the world, and they played music with that in mind. This music, it was 'Let's give it 100 percent, for a minute and a half and then drop out of sheer exhaustion, then shove it out of the way and get on to the next one. It wasn't like we were taking the time to archive this for posterity". Seven tracks were recorded in total. However, the band had not thought of what to do with the tapes, and shelved them.

=== Music ===
Like the Teen Idles' other material, Minor Disturbance features mainly standard hardcore punk melodies and rhythms. Many of the album's songs feature Strejcek shouting over a fast one-two hardcore beat, with MacKaye and Grindle providing short and speedy riffs. On Minor Disturbance, the band drew inspiration from local punk band Bad Brains, as well as Californian hardcore bands such as Black Flag and Germs.

== Release and reception ==
Professional ratings
Review scores
Source	Rating
AllMusic	3/5 stars

After deciding not to release the recordings, the Teen Idles continued to tour locally. However, by October 1980, they had decided to break up, mostly because of Grindle's disillusionment with the band. In their year of touring, they had earned a total of $600. The members gave themselves two options; either divide the money between each member, or press the Inner Ear recordings. MacKaye later recalled, "We just said, 'Let's document overselves'. We figured that having a record would be pretty cool". Nelson added: "I don't remember thinking it was going to be anything more than just one record". Choosing the latter, MacKaye and Nelson founded Dischord Records with Groff's help to release the recordings.

Minor Disturbance, an eight-song EP which included a live version of "Too Young to Rock", was released in December 1980. Dischord organized the pressing and printing, and ordered an initial run of 1,000 7" vinyl discs. However, the packaging of the EP had to be cut, folded and glued by hand; Nelson, Strejcek and MacKaye and friends spent many days assembling the packaging. The EP's front cover was designed by Nelson and featured a photo of MacKaye's younger brother Alec's hands, crossed across his chest, with large under-age Xs (which would later become a symbol of the straight edge movement). The EP's back cover included a photograph of the Teen Idles and a number of friends and fans, outside their penultimate concert at the Chancery in Washington on October 31, 1980.

In October 1984, Minor Disturbance was reissued as part of the Four Old Seven Inches compilation, which combined the EPs of four early Dischord bands. The Four Old Seven Inches compilation and the EP itself fell out of print during the 1980s, so Minor Disturbance was unavailable until October 1995, when the compilation was re-released on compact disc.

== Track listing ==
All lyrics are written by Ian MacKaye; all music is composed by The Teen Idles.

No.	Title	Length
1.	"Teen Idles"	0:45
2.	"Sneakers"	1:28
3.	"Get Up and Go"	0:52
4.	"Deadhead"	1:21
5.	"Fleeting Fury"	1:20
6.	"Fiorucci Nightmare"	0:44
7.	"Getting in My Way"	1:05
8.	"Too Young to Rock" (live at the 9:30 Club on November 6, 1980)	2:04
Total length:		9:20

== Personnel ==
- Nathan Strejcek − vocals
- Geordie Grindle − guitar
- Ian MacKaye − bass
- Jeff Nelson − drums

Production

- Skip Groff – producer
- Don Zientara – engineer
- Jeff Nelson – graphic design, sleeve
- Susie Josephson – front cover photo
- Jay Rabinowitz – back cover photo

== Notes ==
- Azerrad, Michael. Our Band Could Be Your Life. Little, Brown and Company, 2001. ISBN 0-316-78753-1
