= White Trash, Two Heebs and a Bean =

Studio album by NOFX
- Released: November 5, 1992
- Recorded: August 1992
- Studios: Westbeach Recorders, Hollywood, California
- Genres: Hardcore punk, skate punk, melodic hardcore
- Length: 32:19
- Label: Epitaph
- Producers: Donnell Cameron, NOFX

NOFX chronology
The Longest Line (1992)	White Trash, Two Heebs and a Bean (1992)	Punk in Drublic (1994)

Professional ratings
Review scores
Source	Rating
AllMusic	4/5 stars
Robert Christgau	(3-star Honorable Mention)

White Trash, Two Heebs and a Bean is the fourth studio album by the American punk rock band NOFX. It was released on November 5, 1992, through Epitaph Records. It is the first NOFX album to feature El Hefe on guitar, replacing Steve Kidwiler, who left the band in 1991. White Trash, Two Heebs and a Bean was the first NOFX album not produced by Brett Gurewitz, who produced the band's first three albums. According to the liner notes for the album, the original title was going to be White Trash, Two Kikes and a Spic, but one of the band members' relatives thought it was offensive. The title is a reference to the eclectic ethnic identities of the band members: White "trash" (Erik Sandin), two Jews (Fat Mike and Eric Melvin), and a Hispanic (El Hefe).

== Track listing ==
All songs were written by Fat Mike except "Straight Edge," originally by Minor Threat.

No.	Title	Length
1.	"Soul Doubt"	2:46
2.	"Stickin in My Eye"	2:24
3.	"Bob"	2:02
4.	"You're Bleeding"	2:12
5.	"Straight Edge" (Minor Threat cover)	2:11
6.	"Liza and Louise"	2:22
7.	"The Bag"	2:45
8.	"Please Play This Song on the Radio"	2:16
9.	"Warm"	3:30
10.	"I Wanna Be Your Baby"	2:56
11.	"Johnny Appleseed"	2:37
12.	"She's Gone"	2:56
13.	"Buggley Eyes"	1:21
Total length:		32:17

== Personnel ==
NOFX

- Fat Mike – bass, vocals
- Eric Melvin – guitar
- Erik Sandin – drums
- El Hefe – guitar, vocals, trumpet

Additional personnel

- Mike LaVella – backing vocals, voices
- Donnell Cameron – producer, engineer
- Bob Geller – engineer
- MW – art direction, design
- NOFX – producer
- Joe Peccerillo – engineer
- Eddy Schreyer – mastering
- Dan Winters – photography
