= Black Eyes (band) =

American post-hardcore band

- Origin: Washington, D.C., United States
- Genres: Post-hardcore, noise rock, post-punk, experimental, sasscore
- Years active: 2001–2004, 2022–present
- Labels: Dischord, Ruffian
- Members: Dan Caldas; Daniel Martin-McCormick; Hugh McElroy; Jacob Long; Mike Kanin
- Website: dischord.com/band/black-eyes

Black Eyes is an American post-punk band from Washington, D.C., United States, that initially existed from August 2001 to March 2004, disbanding two months prior to the release of their second album, Cough. The band reunited to celebrate the 20th anniversary of their self-titled full-length debut, Black Eyes, announcing a 2023 reissue and their first live performances in 19 years. Black Eyes' members are Dan Caldas, Daniel Martin-McCormick, Hugh McElroy, Jacob Long, and Mike Kanin.

== History ==
In 2002, Black Eyes released a 7" on Ruffian Records (Some Boys / Shut Up, I Never) and a 7" split with Early Humans on Planaria Recordings; the latter includes the track "Have Been Murdered Again," an early version of "Someone Has His Fingers Broken."

Black Eyes' self-titled debut album was released in 2003 on Dischord Records; most tracks feature the band's trademark dual vocals (from bass guitarist Hugh McElroy and guitarist Daniel Martin-McCormick) and two full drum kits. The album was produced by Ian MacKaye and recorded by Don Zientara at his Inner Ear Studios. After Black Eyes, bassist Jacob Long began teaching himself to play saxophone, which he performed in the group's subsequent live shows and recording sessions.

After extensive touring with Q and Not U, Black Eyes disbanded after a show at The Black Cat in Washington, D.C., just two months before the release of their second album, Cough. For this album, the band incorporated frenzied brass instrumentation, pushing further into free-jazz territory.

The band's members went on to pursue other projects, including Ital, Earthen Sea, Marriage, Hand Fed Babies, Sentai, and Mi Ami. McElroy continued to release work on his DIY label, Ruffian Records, while producing and engineering recordings for other artists including Priests, and Kanin founded On Repeat, a sub-label of Astral Spirits.

On November 15, 2022, it was announced that Black Eyes was reuniting and would perform a run of three shows in April 2023 to celebrate the 20th anniversary of their debut album. Along with a reissue of Black Eyes, the band also released previously-unheard demos, live sets, and a zine titled Speaking In Tongues: Black Eyes 2001-2004. The band continued to tour through 2024 and 2025, debuting new songs at these shows. The band also reissued Cough as well, for its 20th anniversary.

On August 13, 2025, the band announced a new album, Hostile Design. The album was released on October 10, 2025 via Dischord Records, and marked their first album in over twenty years. The band announced the release of the album on their blog alongside a new single, "Pestilence." The album was produced by Ian MacKaye and engineered by Don Godwin.

== Members ==
- Daniel Martin-McCormick – vocals, guitar
- Hugh McElroy – vocals, bass guitar
- Jacob Long – bass guitar, saxophone
- Mike Kanin – drums
- Dan Caldas – drums

== Black Eyes discography ==
Full-length albums

- Black Eyes (Dischord, 2003)
- Cough (Dischord, 2004)
- Hostile Design (Dischord, 2025)
