= Out of Step (EP) =

EP by Minor Threat
- Released: April 1983
- Recorded: January 1983
- Studio: Inner Ear Studios
- Genre: Hardcore punk
- Length: 21:36
- Label: Dischord
- Producers: Don Zientara, Minor Threat

Minor Threat chronology
In My Eyes (1981)	Out of Step (1983)	First Two Seven Inches (1984)

Out of Step is the third EP (Note: Many sources often consider Out of Step as an EP or a studio album. Dischord Records, in an advertisement, called the record as an EP in 1985. As of 2024, Dischord also has called the record as an EP on their website. Despite this, retrospective reviews, such as AllMusic and the Rolling Stone Album Guide, call the recording being a studio album. This article calls it an EP for consistency with the record label.) by American hardcore punk band Minor Threat. It was released on vinyl in April 1983 through Dischord Records. All tracks from the album are available on Minor Threat's 1990 compilation album Complete Discography.

It is considered a critical release in punk rock, particularly the hardcore subgenre. Many critics and magazines have cited it as one of the best progressions in the history of rock music, which specifically helped shape the path of many genres of underground musical currents. Its influence was felt in future bands that would boost the youth crew movement, also in other genres such as grunge, post-hardcore, 1990's skate punk and thrash metal, as well in the development of the New York hardcore music scene and aesthetics style.

== Music and lyrics ==
This album's increased complexity in songs, with more elaborate riffs and arrangements, is its main distinguishing factor compared to the band's previous recordings. The bass octaves retain the dynamics of the guitar line. Brian Baker became second guitarist for the album, and Steven Hansgen joined the bass.

Describing the album as an "ode to feeling alienated," Tom Connick of NME explains that the album "fizzes with the fury of feeling different to those around you." The lyrics of most songs focus on themes such as self-reflection, youth frustration, personal problems, and difficulties with friendships. This is in contrast to Minor Threat's first recordings, which had a politically critical message and did not revolve around drug use.

== Background, recording and reissues ==
After a temporary break-up in 1982, Minor Threat entered Inner Ear Studios in January 1983 and recorded Out of Step in three days. The album was produced and engineered by Don Zientara. Many of the songs dealt with conflicts between MacKaye and other people in the Washington, D.C. punk scene, and MacKaye has gone on to state that Out of Step "very much a scene politics record."

According to MacKaye, "Betray" initially "had (...) a really kind of unfortunate kind of funk breakdown in that song that I'm so glad never made it past the practice room. We were all pretty obsessed with go-go music. So we tried to do, like, a little go-go breakdown, but it just didn't work, obviously."

The coda at the end of "Cashing In" was originally a separate piano-led piece the band had dubbed "Addams Family". During the sessions for the EP, the band decided to record the piece purely "to use up the tape," and decided to merge the two songs together.

The album artwork was drawn by Cynthia Connolly, based on a concept by MacKaye.

Knowing that demand for Out of Step was going to be substantial, Dischord initially pressed 3,500 copies, which almost immediately sold out. Most of the band were dissatisfied with the mix, and opted to remix it, despite MacKaye's objections. This second mix was used for all vinyl copies of the EP until the former members of Minor Threat decided to revert to the original mix, starting with Complete Discography.

In May–June 1983, Southern Studios founder John Loder traveled from England to New York where Minor Threat would play a show, and there he offered the band to release Out of Step in the UK. The band knew that he was working with Crass which led them to accept the offer, starting a long-standing relationship between Dischord Records and Southern Studios.

The first vinyl pressing of the album (with plain black cover) appears on the Complete Discography compilation. After the second pressing, the band remixed the album and this version remained in print on vinyl until the 2000s. The latter is distinguishable by a colored stripe with suggested retail price across the front, and "Dischord 10 UK" and "Utopia" in the dead wax. The biggest differences between the original mix and the remixed version are in the songs "Out of Step" and the initially untitled "Cashing In".

In the mid-2000s, the album was remastered on vinyl by Chicago Mastering Service, with no stripe.

In 2022, while digitizing master tracks in Inner Ear Studios, MacKaye and Zientara discovered re-recorded versions of Minor Threat songs "In My Eyes" and "Filler". These versions were recorded so the band could hear what they would sound like with both Lyle Preslar and Brian Baker on guitar and had been forgotten about. Those recordings were released alongside "Addams Family" on a 7-inch as Out of Step Outtakes.

== Reception ==
=== Critical reception ===
Professional ratings
Review scores
Source	Rating
AllMusic	4.5/5 stars
The Rolling Stone Album Guide	4/5 stars
Spin Alternative Record Guide	9/10

Out of Step was met with positive reviews and ratings. Ned Raggett of AllMusic awards it four-and-a-half out of five stars and states: "Building on the promise and fire of the band's earlier singles, Out of Step instantly became iconic for American hardcore, not to mention for the D.C. scene, for years to come, as well as any number of bands who conflated personal and social politics."

=== Legacy ===
Out of Step has received a number of accolades and is cited as a landmark of the hardcore punk genre. It is mentioned in the book 1001 Albums You Must Hear Before You Die.

Publication	Accolade	Rank
Pitchfork Media	Top 100 Albums of the 1980s	100
Spin	Ten Reasons Why We Wish SPIN Had Started in 1984	9
Loudwire	Top 80 Hard Rock & Metal Albums Of The 1980s	19
FACT	The 100 Best Albums of the 1980s	7
NME	The 15 Best Hardcore Albums of All Time	unranked list

== Track listing ==
All songs written by Minor Threat.

No.	Title	Length
1.	"Betray"	3:04
2.	"It Follows"	1:50
3.	"Think Again"	2:18
4.	"Look Back and Laugh"	3:16
5.	"Sob Story"	1:50
6.	"No Reason"	1:57
7.	"Little Friend"	2:18
8.	"Out of Step"	1:20
9.	"Cashing In" (uncredited track on original vinyl version)	3:43
Total length:		21:36

== Personnel ==
- Ian MacKaye – vocals
- Lyle Preslar – lead guitar
- Brian Baker – rhythm guitar
- Steve Hansgen – bass
- Jeff Nelson – drums

Production

- Don Zientara, Minor Threat – producers
- Skip Groff – mixing
- Don Zientara − engineer
- Cynthia Connolly − cover art
- Jeff Nelson – graphic design
