= Flex Your Head =

- Front cover since 2010.

Compilation album by various artists
- Released: January 1982
- Recorded: April 1980 – December 1981
- Studios: Inner Ear; Hit & Run; C.A.B.
- Genre: Hardcore punk
- Length: 41:49
- Language: English
- Label: Dischord
- Producers: Skip Groff; Chris Haskett; Ian MacKaye; Bert Queiroz; Lyle Preslar

Dischord Records chronology
| Possible (1981) | Flex Your Head (1982) | The Faith / Void (1982) |

Early cover art
- First pressing cover.

Alternative cover
- Second pressing cover.

Alternative cover
- 1985 reissue cover.

Professional ratings
Review scores
| Source | Rating |
|---|---|
| AllMusic | 3/5 stars |

Flex Your Head is a sampler album featuring early hardcore punk bands from the Washington, D.C., area. It was originally released in January 1982 on Dischord Records, (Note: Dischord #DIS 7) with a pressing of 4,000 copies on vinyl record that sold out within one week; an additional 3,000 copies were released shortly after. In 1982, a third pressing of 2,000 copies was released under license in the United Kingdom by Alternative Tentacles. (Note: Alternative Tentacles #VIRUS 22) Each of the first three pressings featured a different front cover.

== Background ==
The compilation takes its title from the Minor Threat lyric shouted in the song "12XU", included on the album, originally by the English band Wire.

Dischord assembled Flex Your Head as a way to record the many punk bands that had started up, and sometimes also ceased, in the previous years in the D.C. area. The album served as either a debut or sophomore release for every band on it except Minor Threat, for whom it was their third.

At the time of the album's release not only had most of the bands on it already have broken up, but many had gone on to start other bands, some of those bands also appear on the album. The Teen Idles had broken up in late 1980 and by the time of the release of Flex Your Head members had already started Minor Threat and Youth Brigade. The Untouchables broke up in 1981 and with the former members joining a multitude of bands including The Faith, The Warmers, Rites of Spring, One Last Wish, Skewbald, Happy Go Licky, Youth Brigade, and The Meatmen. State of Alert had also folded in early 1981 as singer Henry Garfield had joined Black Flag. Minor Threat had disbanded (although they would reunite a few months after the album's release) and since then Ian MacKaye and Jeff Nelson had founded Skewbald while Lyle Preslar joined an early version of Big Black. Youth Brigade and Red C both existed solely during 1981, and both Artificial Peace and Deadline would break up within a few months of the release of Flex Your Head, aside from Youth Brigade these band's only recorded output is on the compilation, though from those bands would come the longer lasting Beefeater, Marginal Man and Fugazi. Only Government Issue and Iron Cross would survive past the next year.

The songs "12XU" and "Steppin' Stone" were extremely popular covers in the D.C. punk scene. "Steppin' Stone", which was performed by State of Alert on this album, was also covered by Minor Threat on their second EP In My Eyes, while the song "12XU" was so commonly covered that several shows would have multiple bands playing their renditions.

== Recording ==
Flex Your Head was recorded between April 1980 and December 1981. The Teen Idles, Untouchables, and Red C songs were recorded at Hit and Run Studios with engineer Steve Carr, Iron Cross' tracks were recorded at C.A.B. Studios with engineer Tom Scott, while all the other songs were recorded at Inner Ear Studios with engineer Don Zientara.

== Cover art ==
While the back cover of Flex Your Head has remained almost the same, its front cover has changed throughout the years. When the album was first released, featured a stock photography of a painting of a violin, roses, and sheet music. The second pressing, released almost immediately, came with a stock image of stalks of wheat. A third early cover, designed by Jeff Nelson and used for the British pressing of the album, displayed a black and white version of the flag of Washington, D.C., with the stars replaced by Xs. Later, in 1985, the record was re-released with a new cover featuring a blurry photo of a man in a hat, which was used until 2008. The most recent version, a variation in red and white of the D.C. flag cover from 1982, came in 2010 on a remastered LP re-release.

The CD editions of the album came with all versions of the front cover to be used interchangeably.

== Critical reception ==
Justin M. Norton, contributor at the online magazine Stereogum, was of the view that:

"[Flex Your Head is] a Rosetta Stone not just for the DC scene but all of American hardcore ... Almost every niche of DC hardcore –- and a young performance from almost every crucial DC performer -- is covered in this must-own collection ... In addition to Bad Brains' debut, this is the jumping-off point for everything that followed..."

== Reissues ==
Flex Your Head was re-released on CD in August 1993.

A remastered CD version was released in 2002.

== Track listing ==
Side A
| No. | Title | Writer(s) | Contributing artist | Length |
|---|---|---|---|---|
| 1. | "I Drink Milk" | Ian MacKaye; The Teen Idles | The Teen Idles | 1:07 |
| 2. | "Commie Song" | I. MacKaye; The Teen Idles | The Teen Idles | 0:59 |
| 3. | "No Fun" (originally performed by The Stooges) | Iggy Pop; Dave Alexander; Ron Asheton; Scott Asheton | The Teen Idles | 2:25 |
| 4. | "Rat Patrol" | Alec MacKaye | Untouchables | 0:59 |
| 5. | "Nic Fit" | A. MacKaye | Untouchables | 1:01 |
| 6. | "I Hate You" | A. MacKaye | Untouchables | 1:24 |
| 7. | "I Hate the Kids" | Lyle Preslar; Henry Garfield | State of Alert | 0:39 |
| 8. | "Disease" (originally performed by UK Subs) | Nicky Garratt; Charlie Harper | State of Alert | 0:27 |
| 9. | "Steppin' Stone" (known by Paul Revere & the Raiders and The Monkees) | Tommy Boyce; Bobby Hart | State of Alert | 1:56 |
| 10. | "Stand Up" | I. MacKaye | Minor Threat | 0:52 |
| 11. | "12XU" (originally performed by Wire) | Bruce Gilbert; Graham Lewis; Colin Newman; Robert Gotobed | Minor Threat | 1:09 |
| 12. | "Hey, Ronnie" | Brian Gay | Government Issue | 1:08 |
| 13. | "Lie, Cheat, and Steal" | John Stabb Schroeder | Government Issue | 0:52 |
| 14. | "Moral Majority" | Nathan Strejcek | Youth Brigade | 1:06 |
| 15. | "Waste of Time" | Bert Queiroz; Tom Clinton | Youth Brigade | 0:51 |
| 16. | "Last Word" | Strejcek; Queiroz | Youth Brigade | 1:23 |

Side B
| No. | Title | Writer(s) | Contributing artist | Length |
|---|---|---|---|---|
| 1. | "Jimi 45" | Eric Lagdameo; Peter Murray; Toni Young | Red C | 1:19 |
| 2. | "Pressure's On" | Murray | Red C | 1:40 |
| 3. | "6 O'Clock News" | Lagdameo; Murray | Red C | 2:03 |
| 4. | "Assassin" | Lagdameo; Murray; Young | Red C | 0:56 |
| 5. | "Dehumanized" | John Weiffenbach | Void | 1:15 |
| 6. | "Authority" | Weiffenbach; Bubba Dupree | Void | 0:48 |
| 7. | "My Rules" | Sean Finnegan | Void | 0:59 |
| 8. | "War Games" | Wendel Blow | Iron Cross | 1:22 |
| 9. | "New Breed" | Sab Grey; Dante Ferrando | Iron Cross | 1:21 |
| 10. | "Live for Now" | Ferrando | Iron Cross | 2:13 |
| 11. | "Artificial Peace" | Rob Moss | Artificial Peace | 1:38 |
| 12. | "Outside Looking In" | Mike Manos; Rob Moss; Peter Murray | Artificial Peace | 0:58 |
| 13. | "Wasteland" | Mike Manos; Peter Murray | Artificial Peace | 2:02 |
| 14. | "Stolen Youth" | Ray Hare; Brendan Canty | Deadline | 1:43 |
| 15. | "Hear the Cry" | Canty | Deadline | 1:02 |
| 16. | "Aftermath" | Hare; Canty | Deadline | 2:12 |
| Total length: | | | | 41:49 |

== Personnel ==
=== The Teen Idles ===
- Nathan Strejcek – vocals
- Geordie Grindle – guitar
- Ian MacKaye – bass
- Jeff Nelson – drums

=== Untouchables ===
- Alec MacKaye – vocals
- Eddie Janney – guitar
- Bert Queiroz – bass
- Rich Moore – drums

=== State of Alert ===
- Henry Garfield − vocals
- Michael Hampton − guitar
- Wendel Blow − bass
- Simon Jacobsen − drums

=== Minor Threat ===
- Ian MacKaye – vocals
- Lyle Preslar – guitar
- Brian Baker – bass
- Jeff Nelson – drums

=== Government Issue ===
- John Stabb – vocals
- John Barry – guitar
- Brian Gay – bass
- Marc Alberstadt – drums

=== Youth Brigade ===
- Nathan Strejcek – vocals
- Tom Clinton – guitar
- Bert Queiroz – bass
- Danny Ingram – drums

=== Red C ===
- Eric L. – vocals
- Pete Murray – guitar
- Toni Young – bass
- Tomas Squip – drums

=== Void ===
- John Weiffenbach – vocals
- Bubba Dupree – guitar
- Chris Stover – bass
- Sean Finnegan – drums

=== Iron Cross ===
- Sab Grey – vocals
- Mark Haggerty – guitar
- Wendle Blow – bass
- Dante Ferrando – drums

=== Artificial Peace ===
- Steve Polcari – vocals
- Pete Murray – guitar
- Rob Moss – bass
- Mike Manos – drums

=== Deadline ===
- Ray Hare – vocals
- Christian Caron – guitar
- Terry Scanlon – bass
- Brendan Canty – drums
