= Cynthia Connolly =

American photographer

- Born: Cynthia Anne Connolly; 1964 (age 61–62); Los Angeles, California, United States
- Known for: Photography, letterpress printing, art, curation
- Awards: National Endowment for the Arts Grant (2003). National Endowment for the Arts Grant (2017)
- Website: cynthiaconnolly.com

Cynthia Connolly (born 1964) is an American photographer, curator, graphic designer, and artist.

== Career ==
Connolly graduated from Corcoran College of Art and Design. She worked for Dischord Records and d.c. space in Washington, DC. In 1988, she published Banned in DC: Photos and Anecdotes From the DC Punk Underground (79–85) through her small press Sun Dog Propaganda. The book was compiled with Sharon Cheslow and Leslie Clague. Banned in DC documented the early hardcore punk scene in Washington, DC, including bands like Bad Brains and Minor Threat.

One of Connolly's most well-known works is the album art for Out of Step, the 1983 LP by hardcore punk band Minor Threat. The cover art shows a black crayon-drawn sheep, with his eyes wide open, leaping away from a group of white water-colored sheep. The black sheep has become a symbol for Dischord Records and the label's punk movement; it is widely copied as tattoo art. In a 2015 interview with music blog Dangerous Minds, Connolly said about the sketch:

Minor Threat had asked me to make a drawing for the Out of Step cover. Ian Mackaye and I discussed something to do with a black sheep. The obvious idea was a black sheep that was leaping away from all the white sheep. The black sheep symbolized all of us, the kids that were doing something different, going against the grain of what was going on at the time. I thought of us as young and energetic. I was just 19 when I drew the sheep, I think. I was young and energetic! It was 1983.

Since the mid-1990s, Connolly has exhibited her photography of musicians, landscapes, and found objects. She is a key exemplar of what has come to be known as the “punk aesthetic,” making art from the same D.I.Y. "do it yourself" principles that characterized the punk rock music movement of the late 1970s and 1980s. In addition to traditional art galleries, Connolly has showcased her work in ad hoc art spaces, such as warehouses, bars, vacant buildings, squats and people's homes. She letterpresses her own promotional posters and postcards.

In 2002, she participated in the Rural Studio Program of Auburn University in Newbern, Alabama. There, she won a National Endowment for the Arts grant with the Alabama State Council on the Arts to build a vegetable stand utilizing an art medium called "hogwire" by Alabama folk artist, Butch Anthony, as gates for the stand, and incorporating art by other Alabama artists in the project. She published photographs from her Alabama residency in the book The Rural Studio Bonus Album. Connolly's Alabama photo collection has been shown in four main solo exhibitions as well as group gallery shows, including Transformer Gallery, Auburn University's Rural Studio, SUNY Purchase, amongst others.

Her photographic series of "Ice Machines", and her postcards, books and the cover artwork for Minor Threat's "Out of Step" EP were featured in an art exhibition Beautiful Losers, reviewed in Art in America. Connolly collaborated with Lee Ranaldo of Sonic Youth on the 2004 book Lengths & Breaths, with her photography illustrating Ranaldo's text.

The work exhibited at Civilian Art projects in 2012 made its way to the collection of the J Paul Getty Museum in her home town of Los Angeles, California.

Cynthia Connolly continues to exhibit her photography and create ephemeral objects using her letterpress and photographs. She is the Special Projects Curator for Arlington County, Virginia. Her work with Arlington County and the Arlington Art Truck earned a grant from the National Endowment for the Arts in 2017 and was nominated for the Robert E. Gard Award from Americans for the Arts in 2019.

== Publications ==
=== Books ===
- Banned in DC: Photos and Anecdotes from the DC Punk Underground (79-85). By Cynthia Connolly, Leslie Clague, and Sharon Cheslow. Sun Dog Propaganda, 1988-2015.
- East to West: Trucks Driving. By Cynthia Connolly. Sun Dog Propaganda, 1999.
- Lengths & Breaths. Text by Lee Ranaldo, Photography by Cynthia Connolly. Water Row Press, 2004.
- Big Lots. By Cynthia Connolly. Deadbeat Club, 2015.
- Stories from the Island of Big Sur. Edited by Cynthia Connolly. Self-published, 2020.

== Collections ==
Connolly's photographs, books, and ephemeral art are archived in museums and libraries internationally.

=== Collections list ===
- The J. Paul Getty Museum, Los Angeles, California
- The National Museum of Women in the Arts, Washington, DC
- Corcoran Legacy Collection: The Katzen Museum, Washington, DC
- Smithsonian Museum of American History, Washington, DC
- DC Commission on the Arts and Humanities, Washington, DC
- Luther Brady Collection, George Washington University, Washington, DC
- University of Colorado Boulder, Boulder, Colorado
- Deutsche Bank Art Collection, London, England
- Beinecke Rare Book & Manuscript Library, Yale University, New Haven, Connecticut
- Archive of Documentary Arts, Duke University, Durham, North Carolina
- DC Punk Archive (Washingtonia/Special Collections), DC Public Library, Washington, DC
- Michelle Smith Performing Arts Library, University of Maryland, College Park, Maryland
- Michigan State University Libraries, East Lansing, Michigan
- Arlington Public Library, Arlington, Virginia
