= Straight Edge (song) =

Song by Minor Threat

from the EP Minor Threat
- Released: June 1981
- Genre: Hardcore punk
- Length: 0:46
- Label: Dischord
- Songwriter: Ian MacKaye
- Producers: Ian MacKaye, Minor Threat

"Straight Edge" is a track from Minor Threat's 1981 eponymous debut 7-inch EP, later reissued both as part of the 1984 collection First Two Seven Inches, then as part of 1989's Complete Discography. The song was the inspiration for a movement in the punk subculture known as straight edge.

== Cultural impact ==
The song provides a succinct summary of Ian MacKaye's interpretation of the philosophy that prescribed abstinence from snorting white powder (cocaine), speed (amphetamines), smoking dope (marijuana), sniffing glue (inhalants), and quaalude use.

The anti-inebriation movement had been developing in punk prior to this song, but the song was a major influence in giving the scene a name and, in frontman Ian MacKaye, something of a (somewhat unwilling) figurehead. The song is also notable as being, at 46 seconds long, unusually short, especially considering its cultural impact. The track's themes were later followed up, and further detailed by the later Minor Threat songs "Out of Step (With the World)" and "In My Eyes".

== Critical reception ==
Along with being cited regularly as an important moment in founding the straight edge punk scene, the track has continued to receive critical plaudits, with Pitchfork Media stating that "Straight Edge" "rings with as much immediacy as it ever has", while AllMusic's Blake Butler describes it as an "anthemic, pulse pounding manifesto", citing "this song's importance in the progression of hardcore".

== Personnel ==
- Ian MacKaye – vocals
- Lyle Preslar – guitar
- Brian Baker – bass guitar
- Jeff Nelson – drums

== NOFX cover version ==
Punk band NOFX covered the song on their 1992 album White Trash, Two Heebs and a Bean. The song is played with a jazz melody, and sung in the style of Louis Armstrong.
