= First Two Seven Inches =

1984 compilation album by Minor Threat

Compilation album by Minor Threat
- Released: March 1984
- Recorded: April 1981
- Studios: Inner Ear Studios, (Arlington, Virginia)
- Genre: Hardcore punk
- Length: 16:58; 19:12 (digital release)
- Label: Dischord
- Producers: Minor Threat, Skip Groff

Minor Threat chronology
Out of Step (1983)	First Two Seven Inches (1984)	Salad Days (1985)

First Two Seven Inches (also referred to as Minor Threat) is a compilation EP by American hardcore punk band Minor Threat, released in March 1984 through Dischord Records. The compilation consisted of the group's first and second extended plays, Minor Threat (originally released June 1981) and In My Eyes (originally released December 1981). First Two Seven Inches features the same cover as the 1981 Minor Threat EP, depicting vocalist Ian MacKaye's younger brother Alec (Untouchables, The Faith). The image has been imitated by punk bands such as Rancid on their album ...And Out Come the Wolves and in the Major Threat ad campaign by Nike.

All the tracks from the Minor Threat and In My Eyes EPs are available on CD on Minor Threat's 1990 compilation album Complete Discography and also on Dischord 1981: The Year in 7"s.

== Album information ==
"Straight Edge", a song from the Minor Threat EP, inadvertently inspired the straight edge movement. The song, while written merely as an account of singer Ian MacKaye's personal views and lifestyle, was seen to be a call for abstinence from drugs and alcohol, a then-unusual concept for punk rock and rock music in general.

"Out of Step," from the follow-up In My Eyes EP, followed along similar lines, stating his refusal to engage in drug and alcohol abuse as well as, in MacKaye's words, "conquest oriented sex, people who were just using other people's bodies." Some members of Minor Threat, particularly drummer Jeff Nelson, took exception to MacKaye seemingly speaking for the band, prompting Nelson to print a lyric sheet for the EP with the word "I" in parentheses before each line of the chorus: "Don't smoke/Don't drink/Don't fuck." According to MacKaye,

Jeff came down with this lyric sheet and showed it to me. And I said, "Why are you putting the word 'I' in parentheses? The fourth line qualifies the first [three]. Don't smoke. Don't drink. Don't fuck. But at least I can fucking think." So clearly, I don't do these things, but at least I can do this. You know, like, it just seemed obvious to me.

This prompted an argument between the bandmates, though MacKaye and Nelson eventually compromised and allowed one "I" in parentheses before the first line.

This spurred the band to re-record the track as the title song of their 1983 Out of Step album, on which MacKaye clearly sang "I don't drink/smoke/fuck" (as was the intent of his words all along), and an argument between him and Nelson in which he states that "this is no set of rules, I'm not telling you what to do" was surreptitiously recorded by producer Don Zientara to be dubbed onto the track right before the final chorus. According to Mark Andersen and Mark Jenkins' Dance of Days: Two Decades of Punk in the Nation's Capital, this argument was over exactly what would be said in the message that Nelson wanted MacKaye to record stating essentially what he said without knowing it was being recorded.

"In My Eyes" is an anti-drug song which has been covered by rap metal band Rage Against the Machine, among others. Along with "Straight Edge" and "Out of Step," "In My Eyes" helped to solidify views of Minor Threat as a band with an anti-drug platform. Unlike the original "Straight Edge," a relatively standard hardcore composition, each verse of "In My Eyes" seethes with anger and contempt, building up to the cathartic release of the chorus.

"Guilty of Being White" led to accusations of racial prejudice, due to perceived similarities between the song's lyrics and that of white power rhetoric which often frames the majority race as victims at the hands of a minority group. However, MacKaye has strongly denied such intentions and said that some listeners misinterpreted his words. According to him, the song was written about his experiences growing up in Washington, D.C. at a time of high racial tension, where the majority race in his school was African-American and many black students were hostile towards whites. Slayer later covered the song, though they changed the lyric "guilty of being white" to "guilty of being right" at the song's climax. This infuriated MacKaye, since they were turning his lyrics into having a racist message.

"Minor Threat" is a youth anthem which has been covered by bands as diverse as Sublime, Silverchair, Rise Against, Title Fight, and Pennywise.

"Steppin' Stone" is a cover, written by the team of Tommy Boyce and Bobby Hart in the mid-1960s, and first recorded by Paul Revere & the Raiders and later the Monkees. "Steppin' Stone" has been covered by many punk acts including the Sex Pistols, Johnny Thunders, Untouchables, State of Alert, Ant & Dec and Government Issue.

The digital release of First Two Seven Inches includes the songs "Stand Up" and "12XU" (a Wire cover) from the 1982 Dischord compilation Flex Your Head between the track listings of the Minor Threat and In My Eyes EPs.

== Reception ==
Professional ratings
Review scores
Source	Rating
AllMusic	4.5/5 stars
The Rolling Stone Album Guide	(Minor Threat EP) (In My Eyes EP)
Spin Alternative Record Guide	9/10

Digital music publication Sun 13 listed First Two Seven Inches as one of the greatest EPs of all time in 2021, highlighting the importance of the track "Straight Edge" and its impact on punk culture. UK magazine Far Out called the compilation a "masterpiece" and listed it among the five best introductory albums to hardcore punk alongside other legendary releases like (GI) and Bad Brains. Pop Thruster ranked First Two Seven Inches as the 570th-greatest album of all time in 2023, spotlighting the track "Minor Threat" as a standout.

== Track listing ==
Minor Threat

EP by Minor Threat
- Released: June 1981
- Studios: Inner Ear Studios, (Arlington, Virginia)
- Genre: Hardcore punk
- Length: 9:20
- Label: Dischord
- Producer: Minor Threat

=== Minor Threat EP ===
No.	Title	Writer(s)	Length
1.	"Filler"	Minor Threat	1:32
2.	"I Don't Wanna Hear It"	Ian MacKaye	1:13
3.	"Seeing Red"	Jeff Nelson, MacKaye	1:03
4.	"Straight Edge"	MacKaye	0:46
5.	"Small Man, Big Mouth"	MacKaye	0:55
6.	"Screaming at a Wall"	MacKaye	1:32
7.	"Bottled Violence"	MacKaye, Brian Baker	0:54
8.	"Minor Threat"	MacKaye, Lyle Preslar	1:27
Total length:			9:20

In My Eyes

EP by Minor Threat
- Released: December 20, 1981
- Studios: Inner Ear Studios (Arlington, Virginia)
- Genre: Hardcore punk
- Length: 7:38
- Label: Dischord
- Producer: Minor Threat

=== In My Eyes EP ===
No.	Title	Writer(s)	Length
9.	"In My Eyes"	Minor Threat	2:49
10.	"Out of Step"	Minor Threat	1:20
11.	"Guilty of Being White"	MacKaye	1:17
12.	"Steppin' Stone"	Tommy Boyce, Bobby Hart	2:12
Total length:			7:38

First Two Seven Inches (digital release)
No.	Title	Writer(s)	Length
1.	"Filler"	Minor Threat	1:32
2.	"I Don't Wanna Hear It"	Ian MacKaye	1:13
3.	"Seeing Red"	Jeff Nelson, MacKaye	1:03
4.	"Straight Edge"	MacKaye	0:46
5.	"Small Man, Big Mouth"	MacKaye	0:55
6.	"Screaming at a Wall"	MacKaye	1:32
7.	"Bottled Violence"	MacKaye, Brian Baker	0:54
8.	"Minor Threat"	MacKaye, Lyle Preslar	1:27
9.	"Stand Up"	MacKaye	0:52
10.	"12XU"	Bruce Gilbert, Graham Lewis	1:04
11.	"In My Eyes"	Minor Threat	2:49
12.	"Out of Step"	Minor Threat	1:20
13.	"Guilty of Being White"	MacKaye	1:17
14.	"Steppin' Stone"	Tommy Boyce, Bobby Hart	2:12
Total length:			19:12

== Personnel ==
- Ian MacKaye – lead vocals
- Lyle Preslar – guitar, backing vocals
- Brian Baker – bass, backing vocals
- Jeff Nelson – drums

Additional performers

- Alec MacKaye – backing vocals

Production

- Skip Groff – production, mastering
- Minor Threat – production, mixing
- Don Zientara – engineering, mixing
- Jeff Nelson – graphic design
- Susie Josephson – cover art (Minor Threat)
- Gary Cousins – front cover art (In My Eyes)
- Anna Connelly – back cover art (In My Eyes)
- Glen E. Friedman – photography
- Al Flipside – photography
- Naomi Petersen – photography
