= Steve Hansgen =

- Genres: Hardcore punk
- Occupations: Guitarist
- Instruments: Bass, guitar

Steve Hansgen is an American musician from Washington, D.C. He is best known as a member of the hardcore punk band Minor Threat. He also played briefly in the D.C. hardcore band Government Issue, and joined Youth Brigade for their short reunion in 2012.

== Career ==
=== Early days and Minor Threat (1980–1983) ===
Hansgen became involved in the Washington, D.C. hardcore scene in the early 1980s. He joined Minor Threat as bass guitarist in August 1982 when original bassist Brian Baker, Hansgen's childhood friend, switched to second guitar. Hansgen appeared on the Out of Step LP and toured extensively with the band over the next year. He left Minor Threat in 1983 when its founding members decided to return the band to its original configuration, a few months before their breakup.

=== Second Wind, Government Issue (1983–1989) ===
Hansgen formed Second Wind with Minor Threat roadie Rich Moore in 1984. They released the Security 12" record later that year. In 1984, he was also a roadie for the reformed Meatmen.

Hansgen played bass in Government Issue in 1986. He appears on several tracks on their 1986 self-titled LP. He left the band later that year.

=== Work in production and Emmapeel (1990–1999) ===
In the 1990s, Hansgen continued to work as an engineer and producer. Notably, he worked with Tool on their first demo tape and EP, Opiate (1992).

He played bass around this time in Emmapeel with Government Issue vocalist John Stabb. Emmapeel released the "Avenging Punk Rock Godfathers" 7" in 1993.

=== Middle Aged Brigade, Youth Brigade reunion, other later activity (2000–present) ===
In 2003, Baker and Hansgen began playing in the side project Middle Aged Brigade, with whom they recorded some demos. The band was active sporadically in the years that followed. In 2009, Steve Hansgen joined Mike Dolfi, Boyd Farrell (both from Black Market Baby) and Phil Ricche (of The Intentions) in the band Rustbuckit.

On 29 December 2012, Hansgen reunited with three original members of the seminal DC hardcore band Youth Brigade, vocalist Nathan Strejcek (formerly of seminal band Teen Idles), drummer Danny Ingram and bassist Bert Quieroz for a show at the Washington, D.C. club The Black Cat. The show was a benefit for the D.C. hardcore documentary Salad Days and also featured Scream and Government Issue. That same foursome continued as Youth Brigade and did a second show at the 9:30 Club shortly thereafter as part of the "Punk-Funk Throwdown" series.

Hansgen later played in Dot Dash.
