= Lyle Preslar =

American musician

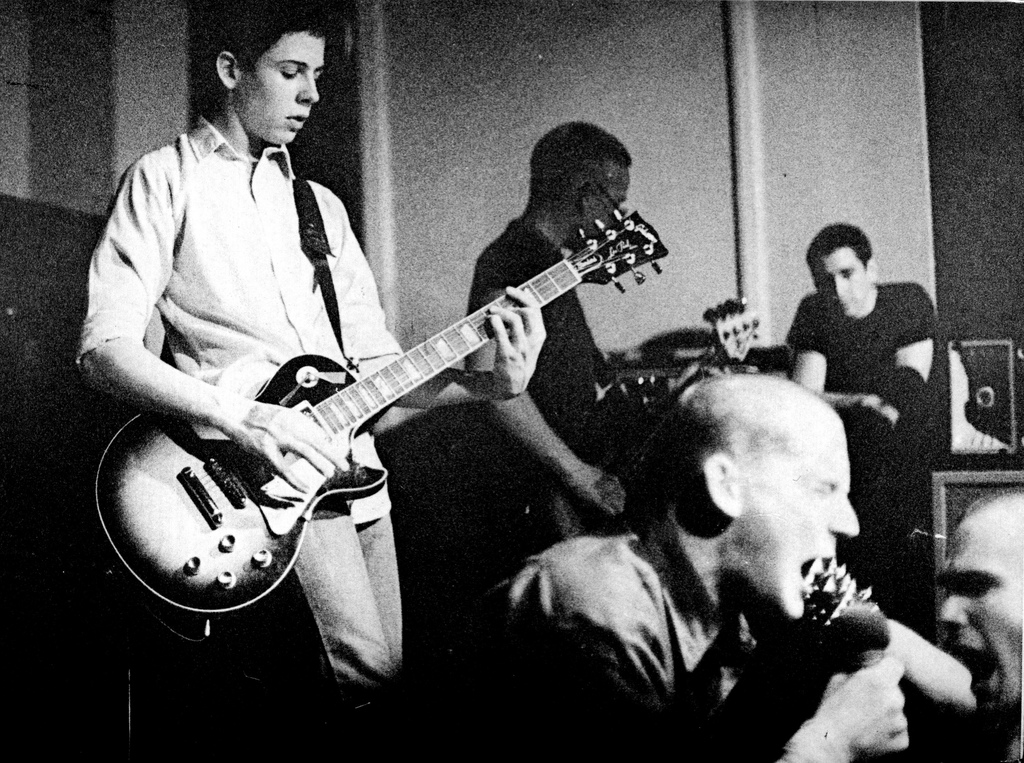
- Lyle Preslar (left) playing with Minor Threat in 1981

Background information
- Genres: Hardcore punk
- Occupations: Guitarist, singer, songwriter
- Instruments: Guitar

Lyle Preslar is an American musician best known for being the guitar player and songwriter for the hardcore punk band Minor Threat.

== Early life and career ==
Before joining Minor Threat, Preslar was the vocalist for D.C. punk band The Extorts, who later became State of Alert after he quit and was replaced by Henry Rollins. Despite not performing on any State of Alert recordings, Preslar received co-writing credit for the songs "Draw Blank" from the No Policy EP and "I Hate the Kids" from the Dischord Records compilation Flex Your Head.

Preslar was a member of Minor Threat during their entire 1980-83 lifespan. His guitar playing has been praised by Minor Threat bandmate Ian Mackaye, who stated "Lyle Preslar, the guitar player, I mean he's one of the most unsung guitar players. He's playing full, six-string-position barre chords at that speed—that's just insane. His accuracy and his rhythms are so incredible." During Minor Threat’s 1981 hiatus when Preslar started school at Northwestern University, he was briefly involved with a nascent version of Big Black in 1981, but soon departed due to personality clashes with Steve Albini.

After Minor Threat dissolved, Preslar played guitar in the first incarnation of Glenn Danzig’s post-Misfits Samhain in 1983, and also with The Meatmen from 1983 to 88.

After retiring from performing, Preslar ran Caroline Records, signing Ben Folds, the Chemical Brothers, and Fatboy Slim. He was later a marketing executive for Elektra Records and Sire Records. In 2007, he graduated from Rutgers School of Law–Newark. He is admitted to practice law in the state of New York.

Preslar is married to Sandy Alouete, an executive at VH1, and they have a child named Romy.

Preslar also won the Grammy Law Initiative Writing Prize in 2007 with an article about the RIAA vs. XM Satellite Radio.

== Bands ==
- The Extorts
- Minor Threat
- Samhain
- The Meatmen

== Discography ==
=== Minor Threat ===
==== Original material ====
- Minor Threat (EP, 1981)
- In My Eyes (EP, 1981)
- Out of Step (studio album, 1983)
- Salad Days (EP, 1985)

==== Compilation albums ====
- Minor Threat (1984)
- Complete Discography (1989)
- First Demo Tape (2003)

==== Compilation appearances ====
- Flex Your Head (1982) – "Stand Up", "12XU"
- Dischord 1981: The Year in Seven Inches (1995) contains the first two EPs
- 20 Years of Dischord (2002) – "Screaming at a Wall", "Straight Edge" (live), "Understand", "Asshole Dub"

=== Samhain ===
- Initium (1983)

=== The Meatmen ===
- War of the Superbikes (1985)
- Rock 'N' Roll Juggernaut (1986)

== Bibliography ==
- Azerrad, Michael (2001). Our Band Could Be Your Life: Scenes from the American Indie Underground, 1981–1991. Little, Brown and Company. ISBN 0-316-78753-1.
- Blush, Steven (2001). George Petros (ed.). American Hardcore: A Tribal History. Feral House. ISBN 978-0-922915-71-2.
- Cantor, Carla (2007). "Successful punk artist, former music industry executive-turned-law-student earns accolades in new arena". Rutgers, The State University of New Jersey. Archived from the original on 7 August 2008.
- Cogan, Brian (2008). The Encyclopedia of Punk. Sterling. ISBN 978-1-4027-5960-4.
