= Ian MacKaye =

American singer and record label owner (born 1962)

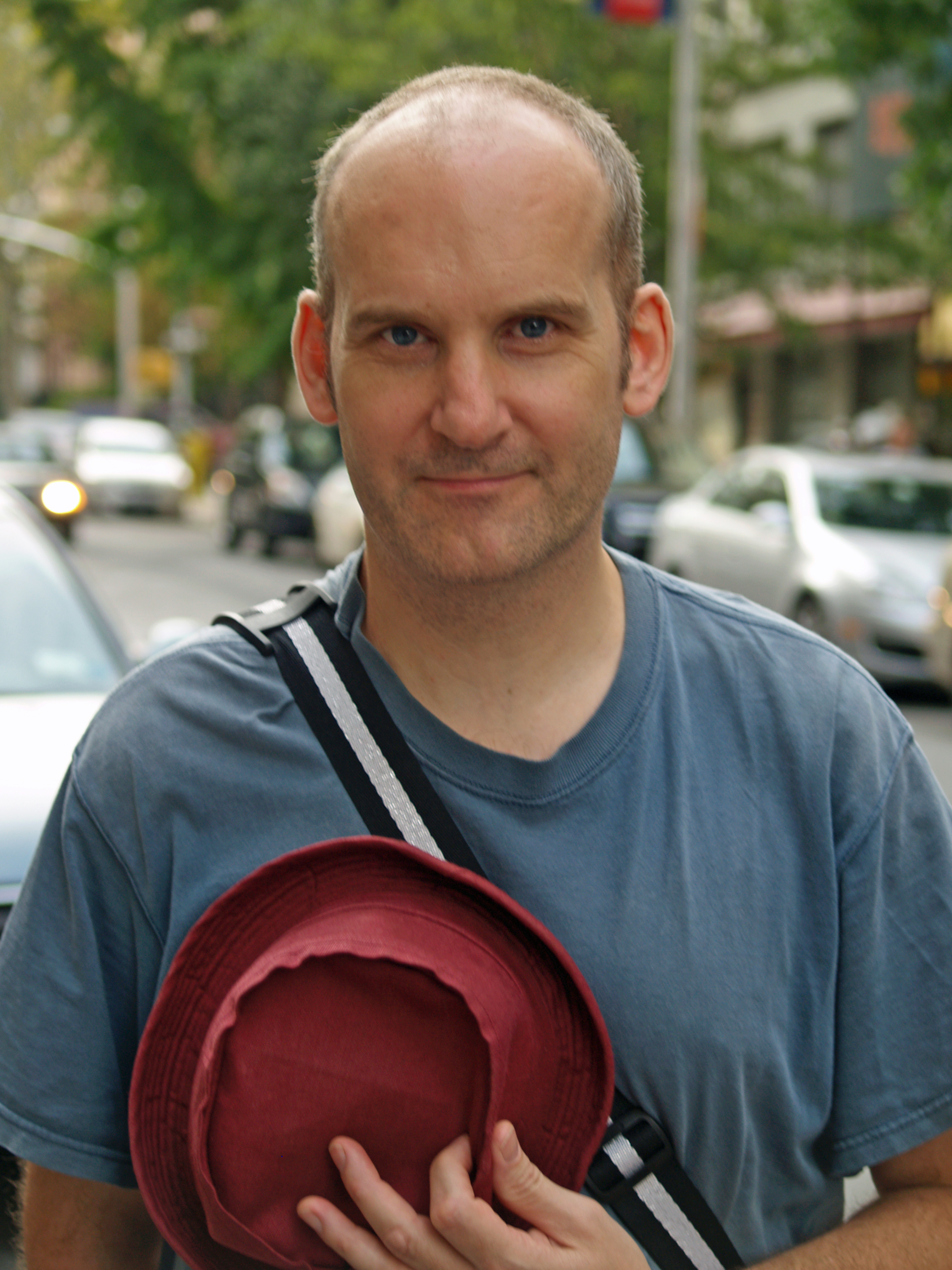
- MacKaye in 2008

Background information
- Born: Ian Thomas Garner MacKaye; April 16, 1962 (age 64); Washington, D.C., U.S.
- Genres: Hardcore punk; post-hardcore; punk rock; experimental rock; indie rock; alternative rock; art punk
- Occupations: Singer; Songwriter; Musician; Record producer; Record label owner; Archivist
- Instruments: Vocals; Guitar; Bass guitar
- Works: {{flatlist|: The Teen Idles discography; [[Minor Threat#Discography| Minor Threat discography; List of songs recorded by Minor Threat; Skewbald/Grand Union (EP); }}
- Years active: 1979–present
- Label: Dischord Discard Records Northern Liberties Rebel Music
- Member of: The Evens; Coriky
- Formerly of: Fugazi; Minor Threat; Teen Idles; Embrace; Egg Hunt; Skewbald/Grand Union; Pailhead; The Nig-Heist

Ian Thomas Garner MacKaye (/məˈkaɪ/; born April 16, 1962) is an American musician. Active since 1979, he is best known as the co-founder and owner of Dischord Records, a Washington, D.C.–based independent record label, and the frontman of hardcore punk band Minor Threat and post-hardcore band Fugazi. MacKaye was also the bassist for the short-lived band the Teen Idles, and frontman for Embrace, and Pailhead, a collaboration with the band Ministry. MacKaye is a member of The Evens, a two-piece indie rock group he formed with his wife Amy Farina in 2001. In 2015 he formed the band Coriky with Farina and his Fugazi bandmate Joe Lally.

Along with his seminal band Minor Threat, he is credited with coining the term "straight edge", a philosophy that promotes abstinence from alcohol and other drugs, though MacKaye has stated that he did not intend to turn it into a movement.

MacKaye has produced releases by Q and Not U, John Frusciante, 7 Seconds, Nation of Ulysses, Bikini Kill, Rites of Spring, Dag Nasty and Rollins Band.

== Biography ==
=== Youth ===
Ian MacKaye was born in Washington, D.C., on April 16, 1962, and grew up in the Glover Park neighborhood of Washington, D.C. His father was a writer for the Washington Post, first as a White House reporter, then as a religion specialist; the senior MacKaye remained active with the socially progressive St. Stephen's Episcopal Church until his death in 2023. In his capacities as a journalist in the White House Press Corps, MacKaye's father was in the presidential motorcade when John F. Kennedy was killed in 1963. MacKaye's paternal grandmother was Dorothy Cameron Disney MacKaye. She worked with Paul Popenoe on marriage advice columns and was a member of the Cosmopolitan Club. His grandfather was Milton MacKaye, also a magazine writer as well as an executive with the Office of War Information. According to MacKaye's longtime friend, singer Henry Rollins, MacKaye's parents "raised their kids in a tolerant, super-intellectual, open-minded atmosphere."

MacKaye first learned to play piano as a child. He eventually took lessons, but quit when his mother placed him in a more academic environment. He first attempted guitar at around ten due to inspirations such as Jimi Hendrix, but again he quit when he was unable to understand the connection between piano and guitar.

MacKaye listened to many types of music, but was especially fond of mainstream hard rock such as Ted Nugent and Queen. MacKaye was introduced to punk rock in November 1978 when a group of his friends, including future filmmaker Jem Cohen, lent him early British punk records such as Sex Pistols' Never Mind the Bollocks, Here's the Sex Pistols and Generation X's Generation X. On February 4, 1979, MacKaye attended his first punk concert, watching The Cramps perform at nearby Georgetown University. He was particularly influenced by the California hardcore scene. MacKaye looked up to hardcore bands like Bad Brains and Black Flag and was childhood friends with Henry Garfield (who later changed his name to Henry Rollins).

=== Early bands ===
MacKaye's first band consisted of one performance as the Slinkees in the summer of 1979, performing a song titled "I Drink Milk." The band also recorded two demo tapes of covers as well as songs that would later be recorded by the Teen Idles.

The Slinkees evolved into the Teen Idles, in which MacKaye played bass guitar and sang back up vocals. The band was short-lived, breaking up in 1980, but released an EP, Minor Disturbance, the first record from MacKaye and bandmate Jeff Nelson's newly founded label, Dischord Records.

=== Minor Threat ===
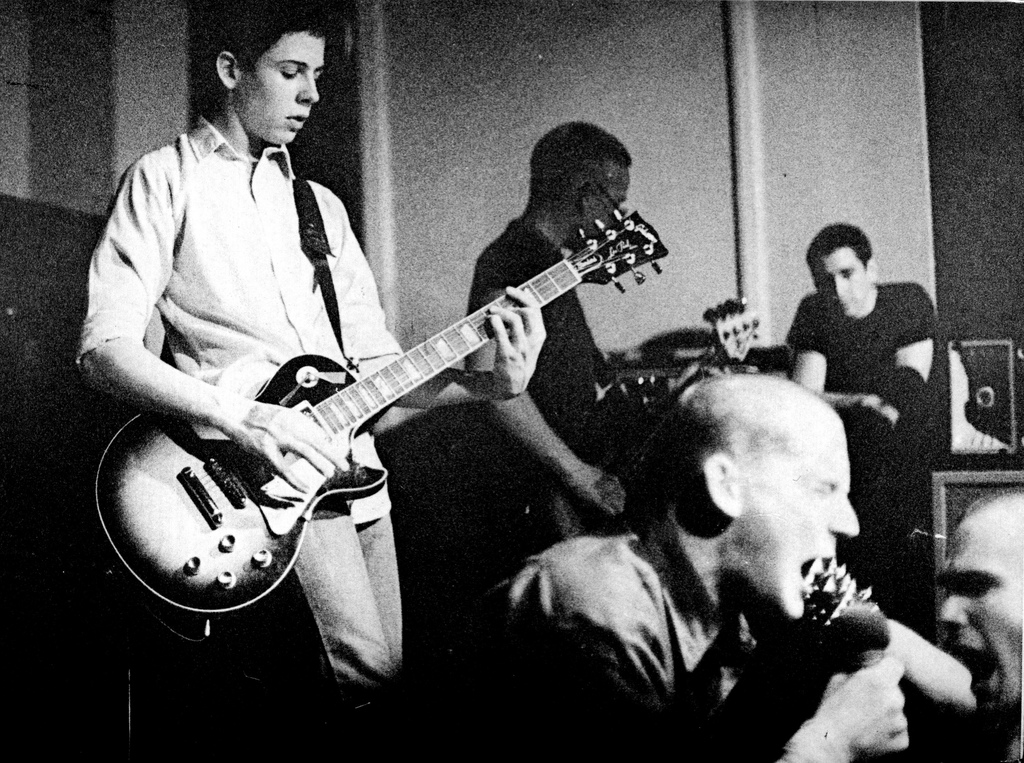
MacKaye (bottom right, with microphone) performing with Minor Threat in 1981

After feeling creatively limited in the Teen Idles, MacKaye was determined to be the frontman and primary lyricist for his own band. He founded Minor Threat (1980–1983) with Nelson after the break up of their previous band. MacKaye cited the dynamic performance of singer Joe Cocker in Woodstock as a major influence on his own animated stage persona. The Teen Idles and Minor Threat were modestly successful in and around Washington, D.C., but would later be cited as two of the earliest and most influential hardcore punk groups, and as pioneers of the straight edge philosophy that rejects use of drugs (including alcohol), tobacco, and casual sex. In his early teens, MacKaye saw the negative effects of drug abuse on several close friends and one immediate family member, and he vowed to never use tobacco, alcohol, or other drugs. During their existence Minor Threat were inactive for several months due to Lyle Preslar being at college; during this hiatus MacKaye and Nelson briefly formed a new band which dissolved when Minor Threat reunited, Skewbald/Grand Union (1981–1982).

After Minor Threat broke up, MacKaye was active with several relatively short-lived groups, including Embrace (1985–1986) and Egg Hunt (1986). Pailhead (1987–1988), a collaboration between MacKaye and the industrial metal band Ministry, then consisting of Al Jourgensen, Paul Barker, and William Rieflin, featured MacKaye on lead vocals.

=== Fugazi ===
In 1987, MacKaye founded Fugazi, a band that has been cited as one of the most important post-hardcore groups. Fugazi set itself apart from most other bands by never playing a show with high-priced tickets. They would often turn down venue options for this very rule, and the band would go so far as to stop a show and have unruly concert goers escorted out of the venue – complete with a refund of their ticket money. The band turned down at least one offer to headline Lollapalooza because festival organizers refused to price tickets cheaply; MacKaye objected to the $30 ticket price. MacKaye also has never conducted an interview with Rolling Stone magazine or any other similar publication, stating he would only do so if the magazine agreed to not advertise cigarettes or alcohol.

=== The Evens ===
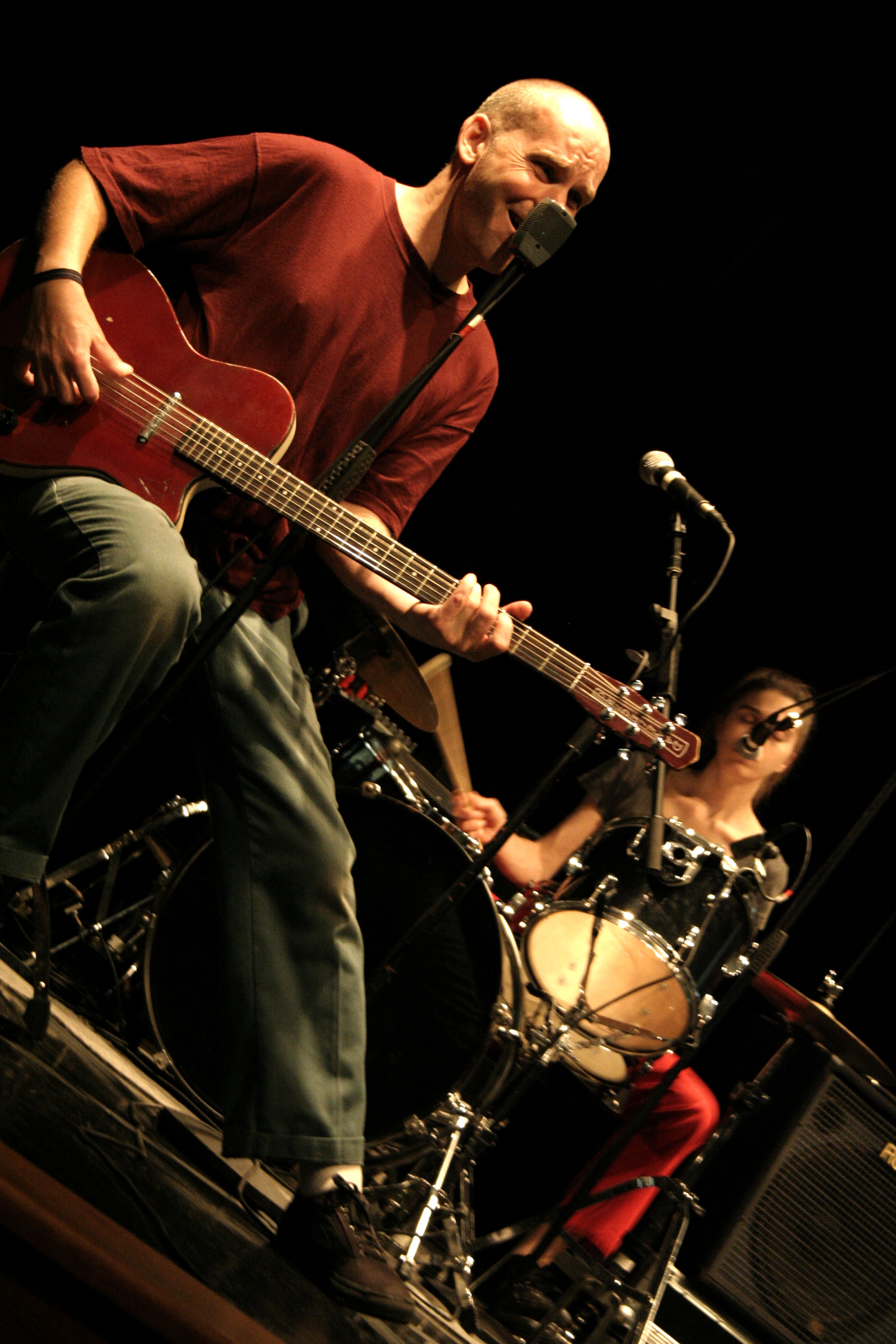
The Evens, featuring MacKaye and Amy Farina

MacKaye currently sings and plays baritone guitar in The Evens with drummer and vocalist Amy Farina of the Warmers. The band pride themselves on playing in non-standard locations, such as community centres, bookshops, or other atypical spaces. The Evens released their self-titled album in early 2005, breaking a three-year silence by MacKaye. Their second album, Get Evens, was released in November 2006. Their last album, titled The Odds, was released 2012.

=== Coriky ===
In 2018, MacKaye, along with Farina and Joe Lally (Fugazi, the Messthetics), debuted a new band. In February 2020, it was announced that the band, now called Coriky, would release their first album on March 27, 2020, however due to the COVID-19 pandemic, the album was pushed back to May 29, 2020. The debut single, "Clean Kill", was released on February 11, 2020.

=== Other projects ===
In 1982, MacKaye sang lead vocals on one version of a Government Issue song titled "Asshole". The previously unreleased track was featured on the 20 Years of Dischord collection released in 2002. Backing vocals and collaborations – as, for example, with brother Alec MacKaye's former band Ignition – are numerous.

MacKaye contributed an extra guitar track to "Youth Against Fascism", the second single from Sonic Youth's 1992 album Dirty.

In 1988, he recorded vocals with Ministry's Al Jourgensen, Paul Barker, and Bill Rieflin for the band Pailhead's EP titled "Trait". He also co-wrote the song "I Will Refuse" which was also released by the Wax Trax! record label.

In February 2004, MacKaye produced the recording sessions for John Frusciante's solo album titled DC EP. After working with MacKaye, Frusciante states "Ian is one of the only living people who I really respect and look up to, so it was an honor and a pleasure as well as a great learning experience to hear his perspective."

MacKaye has also contributed guitar and backing vocals to Joe Lally's solo albums There to Here, released in October 2006, and Nothing Is Underrated, released in November 2007.

Throughout his music career MacKaye has engineered and produced releases by a number of bands primarily on his Dischord label including 7 Seconds, Antelope, Bikini Kill, Black Eyes, Lungfish, Nation of Ulysses, One Last Wish, Q and Not U, Rites of Spring, Rollins Band, and others.

=== Dischord Records ===
MacKaye co-founded Dischord Records with Jeff Nelson in 1980 and it continued as a DIY project, whereby those involved learned how to produce records – MacKaye claims that they crafted 10,000 singles by hand for a Teen Idles release.

== Career ==
=== Campaigning, business and activism ===
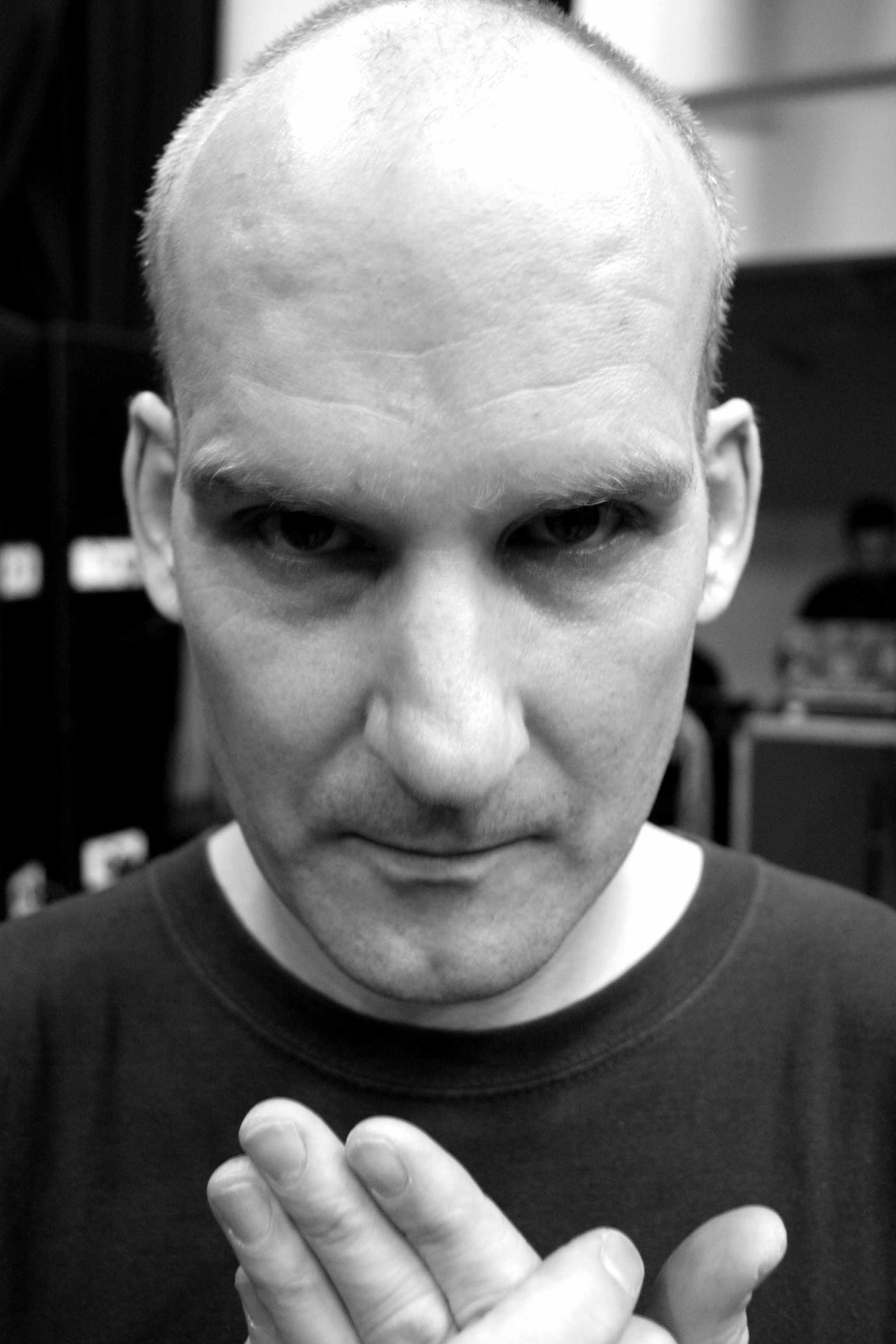
MacKaye in 2007

Throughout his career, MacKaye has opted to advertise in independent and underground media and perform in unconventional venues. Such practices keep admission prices low (in the US$5–US$15 range) and allow fans of all ages to attend performances. Maintaining a low overhead and protecting monetary assets are also important ideals for MacKaye, who in the summer of 1990 formed the corporation Lunar Atrocities Ltd in order to shield his own and his bandmates' personal assets from the threat of lawsuits. As Seth Martin, MacKaye's financial adviser explained to the Washington Post in a 1993 interview: "protection from liability is the main reason to form a corporation, and for these guys it makes sense. If someone got hurt stage-diving and decided to sue, it would be a little harder to go after their personal assets."

MacKaye has also been known to rebuke concert violence and to confront crowd surfers and other unruly concert attendees who start fights. This is especially true of his days with Fugazi. When audience members became belligerent or violent at a Fugazi show, the band would cease to play (sometimes right in the middle of a song) and MacKaye would tell them to stop. If those people continued their behavior, he would have their admission price refunded and have them ejected from the concert venue.

In 2007 MacKaye provided technical audio assistance to Alan Canfora, a former Kent State University student who, in 1970, was injured by a gunshot while protesting the U.S. invasion of Cambodia. MacKaye cleaned up a field recording of the incident made by another student. According to Canfora, a voice can be heard on the tape yelling, "Right here! Get set! Point! Fire!" before a 13-second volley of gunfire commences.

== Impact ==
=== Straight edge philosophy ===
The song "Straight Edge" was written by MacKaye for his band Minor Threat and was released in 1981 on Minor Threat's self-titled EP. It was a song that described his personal life free of drugs, alcohol and "sex as a conquest", though claimed he was not attempting to force the lifestyle on others. The song came about through MacKaye moving away from DC as a teenager, briefly to Palo Alto, California, and returning to find friends addicted to alcohol and drugs.

His decision to abstain from substances began to influence youth culture as Minor Threat gained popularity through numerous live shows and sales of their EP. Although to MacKaye the song did not represent a philosophy or a movement, over time people adopted the philosophy of the song and many bands began to label themselves "straight edge", founding the straight edge movement. Although straight edge is not explicitly supportive of vegetarianism, MacKaye has stated that he is a vegetarian because he regards it as a logical progression of his views. He follows a strict vegan diet. In interviews especially in his later life, MacKaye has often become annoyed with questions about being the founding father of a movement he never intended to start:

"I'm credited because I coined a phrase and wrote a song about it. I'm not going to spend any more energy than I already have explaining that. From the very beginning I've tried to say that this is not my opinion. That whole thing just makes me realize I don't have any control over what people think of me. And I don't really give a fuck. I think that the idea of straight edge, the song that I wrote, and the way people have related it, there's some people who have abused it, they've allowed their fundamentalism to interfere with the real message, which in my mind, was that people should be allowed to live their lives the way they want to. It was just the title of a song that I wrote but certainly never intended to start a movement."

Although "Straight Edge" gets the most attention, MacKaye wrote other songs with Minor Threat describing his clean lifestyle as well, most notably "Out of Step (With the World)," in which he said "I don't smoke. I don't drink. I don't fuck. At least I can fucking think." "In My Eyes" is also at least partially about his philosophies, with lines such as "You tell me it calms your nerves; you just think it looks cool."

== Discography ==
=== The Slinkees ===
- Who Cares? (1979)

=== The Teen Idles ===
- Minor Disturbance, 7-inch EP (1980)
- 3 songs on Flex Your Head, compilation LP (1982)
- First EP reissued as part of Four Old 7″s on a 12″ (1984)
- First EP reissued on Dischord 1981: The Year in 7″s (1995)
- Teen Idles, 7-inch and CD EP (1980 demos) (1996)
- 20 Years of Dischord (2002)

=== Minor Threat ===
- Minor Threat (1981)
- In My Eyes (1981)
- Flex Your Head (1982)
- Out of Step (1983)
- Minor Threat (First Two Seven Inches) (1984)
- Dischord 1981: The Year in 7″s (1985)
- Salad Days (1985)
- Minor Threat Live (1988)
- Complete Discography (1989)
- 20 Years of Dischord (2002)
- First Demo Tape (2003)
- Left of the Dial: Dispatches from the '80s Underground (2004)
- American Hardcore: The History of American Punk Rock 1980–1986 (2006)
- Out of Step Outtakes (2023)

=== Skewbald/Grand Union ===
- Skewbald/Grand Union, 7-inch EP (recorded in 1981) (1991)
- 20 Years of Dischord (2002)

=== Egg Hunt ===
- Egg Hunt (1986)

=== Embrace ===
- Embrace (1987)
- 20 Years of Dischord (2002)

=== Pailhead ===
- "I Will Refuse" b/w "No Bunny", 7-inch and 12-inch single (1987)
- "Man Should Surrender" b/w "Anthem", 7-inch single (1988)
- "Don't Stand in Line" b/w "Ballad", 7-inch single (1988)
- Trait, 12-inch EP (comprising Pailhead's last two singles) and CD (made up of all 3 singles) (1988)

=== Fugazi ===
- Fugazi (1988)
- Margin Walker (1989)
- State of the Union (1989)
- 13 Songs (1989)
- 3 Songs (1990)
- Repeater (1990)
- Repeater + 3 Songs (1990)
- International Pop Underground Convention (1991)
- Steady Diet of Nothing (1991)
- In on the Kill Taker (1993)
- Red Medicine (1995)
- End Hits (1998)
- Instrument Soundtrack (1999)
- The Argument (2001)
- Furniture (2001)
- 20 Years of Dischord (2002)
- Fugazi Live Series (2004)
- First Demo (2014)

=== The Evens ===
- The Evens (2005)
- Get Evens (2006)
- 2 Songs (2011)
- The Odds (2012)

=== Coriky ===
- Coriky (2020)

== Equipment ==
=== Guitars ===
- Gibson SG – MacKaye's main guitar with Fugazi was a white mid 1970's Gibson SG. He also frequently used another mid 1970s brown SG. Both guitars are fitted with DiMarzio Super Distortion humbuckers in the bridge position.
- Creston Electric Instruments Baritone – MacKaye uses a Danelectro baritone guitar with The Evens.

=== Amplification ===
- Marshall JCM800 100-watt 2203 [horizontal Input] (also seen with footage of late 70's era Marshall JMP 100 watt 2203 Master Volume model.)
- Marshall JCM800 4×12 cabinets fitted with 65-watt celestion speakers.
- Fender Tweed Delux, used when performing with The Evens.

=== Effects ===
MacKaye does not use effects.

== Personal life ==
MacKaye currently lives in Washington, D.C., with his wife Amy Farina and their son Carmine Francis Farina MacKaye, who was born on May 24, 2008.

In 2012, MacKaye's wife threw him a surprise 50th birthday party which included many guests from the late 1970s and early 1980s DC punk/hardcore scene, many of whom had not seen each other in 20 years.

MacKaye's younger brother Alec MacKaye has also been active in several notable bands, such as Untouchables, the Faith, Ignition and The Warmers, which included Ian's wife Amy. His musical collaborations with Ian are limited but he is known for appearing in the iconic photograph used for many Minor Threat releases including Complete Discography.

He has been close friends with Henry Rollins since childhood and was the first person to take the stage at Rollins' 50th birthday performance at the National Geographic Explorers' Hall in Washington DC on February 13, 2011. They speak to each other every week by phone, usually on Sundays.

Despite persistently voting Democratic, MacKaye does not explicitly consider himself a Democrat. He has explained that he votes solely for the politician he believes is least likely to engage in war. He also noted that he had voted for Barack Obama in the 2008 presidential election. He stated in 2013:

I do vote every four years. My approach is pretty straightforward. I think whoever becomes president of this country, this country deserves. But the rest of the world does not deserve this president. [...] It seems to me the most profound habitual effect of the American policy is that it manifests in war. It manifests in the murdering of people in other countries by our machines, our weapons, and our people. So my voting record is always vote for the person [...] who is least likely to go to war. I think that is the best I can do. And in terms of a deeply unethical situation, I have to find someone who will murder less people in other parts of the world.

== Works outside of music ==
=== Filmography ===
MacKaye was interviewed in the documentary films Roll Up Your Sleeves, DIY America, American Hardcore, 930 F, Another State of Mind, Instrument, Dogtown and Z-Boys, D.I.Y. or Die: How to Survive as an Independent Artist, Don't Need You: The Herstory of Riot Grrrl, Punk's Not Dead, We Jam Econo, I Need That Record!, EDGE: Perspectives on Drug Free Culture, Salad Days, Industrial Accident: The Story of Wax Trax! Records, and the K Records documentary The Shield Around the K. In 2014, MacKaye was featured in the documentary Foo Fighters Sonic Highways, which follows and celebrates the Foo Fighters on their 20th anniversary and the making of their 8th studio album Sonic Highways. The documentary revisits the band's sources of inspiration, with MacKaye playing a defining role. He was also interviewed in the documentary film Breadcrumb Trail: The Story of Slint, made about the band Slint.

MacKaye was also featured in professional skateboarder Mike Vallely's documentary film Drive (2002).

In 2024 MacKaye was featured in the documentary Cover Your Ears produced by Prairie Coast Films and directed by Sean Patrick Shaul, discussing music censorship.

=== Books ===
MacKaye has contributed to several books, including The Idealist by Glen E. Friedman (Burning Flags Press, 1998, updated 2004, ISBN 0-9641916-5-2); a foreword to indie-punk band photographer Pat Graham's photobook Silent Pictures; an introduction to Susie Horgan's photobook Punk Love, Interrobang?! Anthology on Music and Family, edited by Sharon Cheslow; and is interviewed in American Heretics: Rebel Voices In Music by Ben Myers (Codex Books, 2002). MacKaye is also featured in the Friedman book Keep Your Eyes Open (ISBN 0-9641916-8-7), a collection of Fugazi photos taken by Friedman over the course of the band's career.

He also had a conversation with photographer Jim Saah, included in the photozine In My Eyes,(ISBN 978-987-46715-1-6) published by Argentinian publishing house Walden Editora in 2018.
