= Jeff Nelson (drummer) =

American drummer (born 1962)

- Born: 1962 (age 63–64); South Africa
- Genres: Hardcore punk
- Occupations: Musician, graphic designer
- Instruments: Drums
- Formerly of: Minor Threat, The Teen Idles, Egg Hunt, High Back Chairs, Three (band)

Jeff Nelson (born 1962 in South Africa) is an American drummer, graphic designer, and record label owner. He formerly played for the Washington, D.C. hardcore punk band Minor Threat.

== Biography ==
Nelson met Ian MacKaye in high school and the two saw their first punk rock show, The Cramps, together. Soon after, they formed their first band, The Slinkees. After playing one show, a lineup change caused them to rename the band The Teen Idles.

He also co-founded the independent record label Dischord Records along with MacKaye in 1980, whose first record was the Teen Idles. They continue to run Dischord together. The duo also comprised the projects Skewbald/Grand Union and Egg Hunt; both bands recorded only one single.

Nelson also runs the record label Adult Swim Records (distributed by Dischord) and Pedestrian Press, as well as being a political activist. Nelson collects Jeep Wagoneers and resides in Toledo, Ohio. He spearheaded an effort in 2008 to successfully save Toledo's Scott High School from demolition.

== Discography ==
=== Minor Threat ===
==== Original material ====
- Minor Threat (EP, 1981)
- In My Eyes (EP, 1981)
- Out of Step (studio album, 1983)
- Salad Days (EP, 1985)

==== Compilation albums ====
- Minor Threat (1984)
- Complete Discography (1989)
- First Demo Tape (2003)

==== Compilation appearances ====
- Flex Your Head (1982) – "Stand Up", "12XU"
- Dischord 1981: The Year in Seven Inches (1995) contains the first two EPs
- 20 Years of Dischord (2002) – "Screaming at a Wall", "Straight Edge" (live), "Understand", "Asshole Dub"

== Bibliography ==
- Blush, Steven; Petros, George (2001). George Petros (ed.). American Hardcore: A Tribal History. Feral House. ISBN 978-0-922915-71-2.
- Cogan, Brian; Spheeris, Penelope (2008). The Encyclopedia of Punk. Sterling. ISBN 978-1-4027-5960-4.
