= Inner Ear Studios =

Recording studio in Arlington, Virginia, USA

Coordinates: 38.8439°N 77.0895°W

- Type: Recording Studio
- Industry: Entertainment, Music
- Founded: 1970 (original studio); 2022 (re-opening)
- Founder: Don Zientara
- Defunct: 2021 (original studio)
- Headquarters: Arlington County, Virginia, U.S.
- Owner: Don Zientara
- Website: www.innerearstudio.com

Inner Ear Studios is a recording studio founded in Arlington, Virginia that has been in operation since the late 1970s. Originally started in founder Don Zientara's basement, the studio spent many years on South Oakland St. in Arlington. The studio is now back in Don's basement, and has been in continuous operation for over 40 years. During that time, virtually all of Washington, DC's most widely recognized and acclaimed bands have recorded there. The studio is known for its association with the Washington, D.C. hardcore scene.

== History ==
The studio was started by Zientara in his own home in Arlington in the late 1970s. At first, Zientara recorded harp music and Celtic folk tunes, but at the end of the 70's, Zientara began to record punk music, with Teen Idles being one of the first bands he recorded. Zientara moved the studio to its own building in 1990.

In 2014, the studio was featured on Dave Grohl's Sonic Highways television mini-series.

In 2021, it was announced that the studio's building might be bought by Arlington County as part of development for a new art and industrial district. Zientara said he expected to have to vacate by 2021, and that he was considering multiple options, including retirement. Zientara announced that the studio would close on October 1, 2021. The closing took place in late 2021. Filmmaker Bryan Davis published a nine-minute documentary about the closing, mainly consisting of an interview with Zientara. In 2022 Zientara reopened the studio in his basement.

== Artists ==
Inner Ear Studios played an important role in the Washington, D.C. hardcore scene. The studio produced records for artists including Minor Threat, Bad Brains, Fugazi, Mary Timony, Braid, The Teen Idles, Foo Fighters, and the Urban Verbs.
