= Minor Threat =

American hardcore punk band (1980–1983)

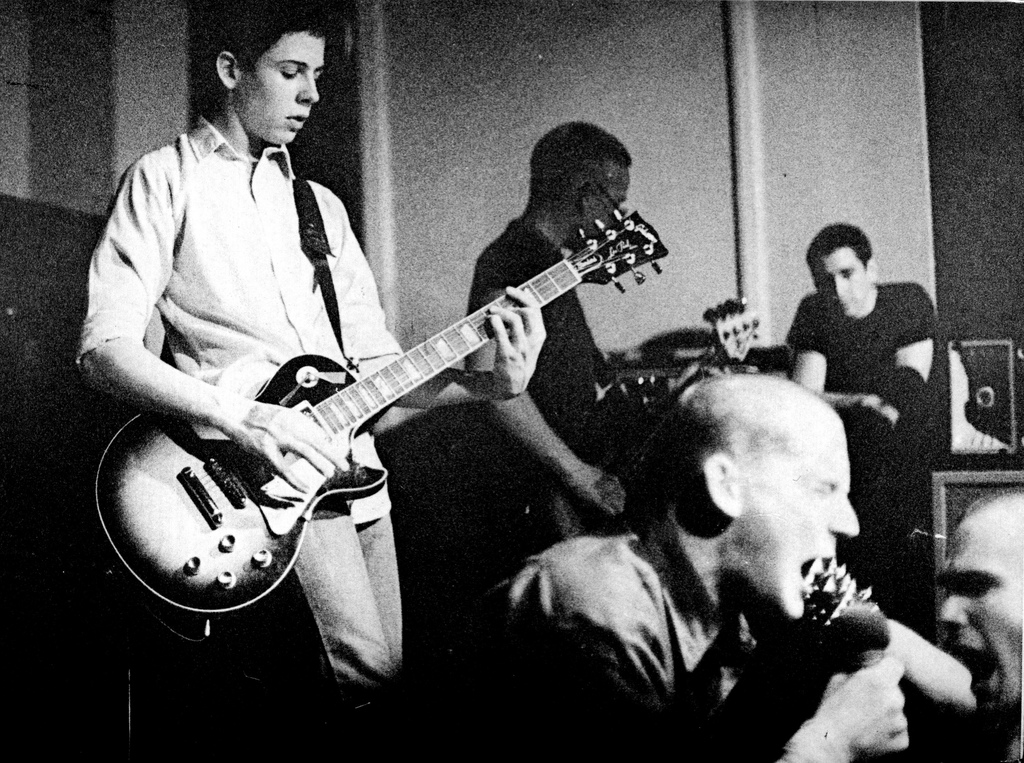
- Minor Threat performing at the Wilson Center in Washington, D.C., in 1981

Background information
- Origin: Washington, D.C., U.S.
- Genre: Hardcore punk
- Years active: 1980–1983
- Label: Dischord
- Spinoffs: Dag Nasty; Egg Hunt; Embrace; Fugazi; Samhain; Skewbald/Grand Union
- Spinoff of: The Teen Idles
- Past members: Ian MacKaye; Jeff Nelson; Brian Baker; Lyle Preslar; Steve Hansgen
- Website: www.dischord.com/band/minor-threat

Minor Threat was an American hardcore punk band, formed in 1980 in Washington, D.C., by vocalist Ian MacKaye and drummer Jeff Nelson. MacKaye and Nelson had played in several other bands together, and recruited bassist Brian Baker and guitarist Lyle Preslar to form Minor Threat. They added a fifth member, Steve Hansgen, in 1982, playing bass, while Baker switched to second guitar.

The band was relatively short-lived, disbanding after only three years together, but had a strong influence in the emerging American hardcore punk scene, both stylistically and in helping to further establish the "do it yourself" ethic for music distribution and concert promotion. Minor Threat's song "Straight Edge" was the basis of the straight edge movement, which emphasized a lifestyle without alcohol or other drugs, or promiscuous sex. AllMusic said the band's music was "iconic" and noted that it "ha[d] held up better than [that of] most of their contemporaries."

Along with the fellow Washington, D.C. hardcore band Bad Brains and California band Black Flag, Minor Threat set the standard for many hardcore punk bands in the 1980s and 1990s. All of Minor Threat's recordings were released on MacKaye's and Nelson's own label, Dischord Records. The EPs, Minor Threat (1981) and Out of Step (1983), have received a number of accolades and are cited as landmarks of the hardcore punk genre.

== History ==
=== Formation and early years ===
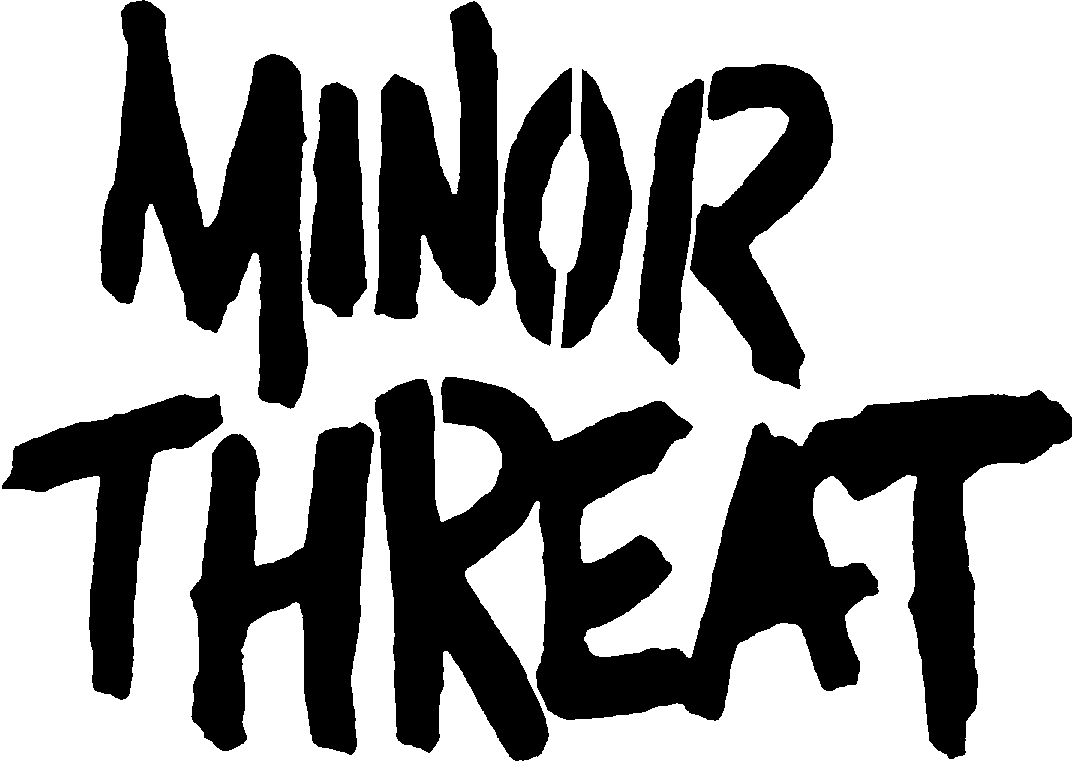
The band logo

Prior to forming Minor Threat in 1980, vocalist Ian MacKaye and drummer Jeff Nelson had played bass and drums respectively in the Teen Idles while attending what was then Wilson High School. During their two-year career within the flourishing Washington, D.C. hardcore punk scene, the Teen Idles had gained a following of around one hundred fans (a sizable amount at the time), and were seen as only second within the scene to the contemporary Bad Brains. MacKaye and Nelson were strong believers in the DIY mentality and an independent, underground music scene. After the breakup of the Teen Idles, they used the money earned through the band to create Dischord Records, an independent record label that would host the releases of the Teen Idles, Minor Threat, and numerous other D.C. punk bands.

Eager to start a new band after the Teen Idles, MacKaye and Nelson recruited guitarist Lyle Preslar and bassist Brian Baker. They played their first performance in December 1980 to fifty people in a basement, opening for Bad Brains, The Untouchables, Black Market Baby and S.O.A., all D.C. bands.

The band's first 7-inch EPs, Minor Threat and In My Eyes, were released in 1981. The group became popular regionally and toured the east coast and Midwest.

"Straight Edge," a song from the band's first EP, helped to inspire the straight edge movement. The lyrics of the song relay MacKaye's first-person perspective of his personal choice of abstinence from alcohol and other drugs, contrary to most rock musicians at the time. Although the original song was not written as a manifesto or a "set of rules," according to the band members, many later bands inspired by the idea used it as such. Minor Threat band members stated they never intended or viewed "Straight Edge" as a "movement".

"Out of Step", a Minor Threat song from their second EP, further demonstrates the said belief: "Don't smoke/Don't drink/Don't fuck/At least I can fucking think/I can't keep up/I'm out of step with the world." The "I" in the lyrics was usually only implied, mainly because it did not quite fit the rhythm of the song. Some of the other members of Minor Threat, Jeff Nelson in particular, took exception to what they saw as MacKaye's imperious attitude on the song. The line "Don't fuck" sparked widespread debate, to which Ian clarified that the intent was commentary on society's attitude towards predatory or casual sex, not on the act itself.

Minor Threat's song "Guilty of Being White" led some critics to accuse the band of racism, but MacKaye has strongly denied such intentions and said that some listeners misinterpreted his words. He claims that his experiences attending Wilson High School, whose student population was 70 percent Black, inspired the song. There, many students bullied MacKaye and his friends. In an interview, MacKaye stated that he was offended that some perceived racist overtones in the lyrics, saying, "To me, at the time and now, it seemed clear it's an anti-racist song. Of course, it didn't occur to me at the time I wrote it that anybody outside of my twenty or thirty friends who I was singing to would ever have to actually ponder the lyrics or even consider them." Thrash metal band Slayer later covered the song, with the last iteration of the lyric "guilty of being white" changed to "guilty of being right."

=== Breakup ===
Poster promoting what would be Minor Threat's final show

Minor Threat split up in 1983. Creative differences were the main factor in the breakup, Preslar and Baker having become fans of the band U2 and wanting Minor Threat to pursue a similar musical direction. According to Baker:

Did we all want to develop Minor Threat’s sound to be more melodic, but Ian MacKaye didn't? Yes, Ian was right, and we were wrong. What Ian was doing was not just a band, Ian was building a community. He was so far ahead of his time and was thinking about the idea of Dischord and several bands and having this kind of reciprocating relationship with other artists. He was so big picture. But I was like: 'I want to play bigger shows, I want to tour more. Minor Threat is a great little punk band, but have you heard the Boy album…?' I was dumb! And he wasn't. So Minor Threat fortunately stopped exactly when it did.

MacKaye was skipping rehearsal sessions towards the end of the band's career, and he wrote the lyrics to the songs on the Salad Days EP in the studio. That was quite a contrast with the earlier recordings, as he had written and co-written the music for much of the band's early material. Minor Threat, which had returned to being a four-piece group with the departure of Hansgen, played its final show on September 23, 1983, at the Lansburgh Cultural Center in Washington, D.C., sharing the bill with go-go band Trouble Funk, and Austin, Texas punk funk act the Big Boys. In a meaningful way, Minor Threat ended their final set with "Last Song", a tune whose name was also the original title of the band's song "Salad Days".

=== Subsequent activities ===
In March 1984, six months after the band broke up, the EPs Minor Threat and In My Eyes were compiled together and re-released as the Minor Threat album. The Complete Discography archival compilation would follow in 1989, with the additional release of First Demo Tape in 2003. Two previously unreleased songs were featured on the 20 Years of Dischord compilation in 2002.

Nelson played less-frantic alternative rock with Three and The High-Back Chairs before retiring from live performance. He runs the record label Adult Swim Records (distributed by Dischord) and Pedestrian Press, as well as being a political activist.

== Copyright issues ==
=== "Major Threat" ===
In 2005, a mock-up of the cover of Minor Threat's first EP (also used on the Minor Threat LP and Complete Discography CD) was copied by athletic footwear manufacturer Nike for use on a promotional poster for a skateboarding tour called "Major Threat". Nike also altered Minor Threat's logo (designed by Jeff Nelson) for the same campaign, as well as featuring Nike shoes in the new picture, rather than the combat boots worn by Ian MacKaye's younger brother Alec on the original.

MacKaye issued a press statement condemning Nike's actions and said that he would discuss legal options with the other members of the band. Meanwhile, fans, at the encouragement of Dischord, organized a letter-writing campaign protesting Nike's infringement. On June 27, 2005, Nike issued a statement apologizing to Minor Threat, Dischord Records, and their fans for the "Major Threat" campaign and said that all promotional artwork (print and digital) that they could acquire was destroyed.

=== "Salad Days" ===
On October 29, 2005, Fox played the first few seconds of Minor Threat's "Salad Days" during an NFL broadcast. Use of the song was not cleared by Dischord Records or any of the members of Minor Threat. Fox claimed that the clip was too short to have violated any copyrights.

=== Wheelhouse Pickles ===
In 2007, Brooklyn-based company Wheelhouse Pickles marketed a pepper sauce named "Minor Threat Sauce". Requesting only that the original label design (which was based on the "Bottled Violence" artwork) be amended, Ian MacKaye gave the product his endorsement. A small mention of this was made, where MacKaye commented, "I don't have an occasion to eat a lot of hot sauce, but I also thought the Minor Threat stuff was nice."

=== Urban Outfitters ===
In 2013, Minor Threat shirts began appearing in Urban Outfitters stores. Ian MacKaye confirmed that the shirts were officially licensed. Having spent what he described as "a complete waste of time" trying to track down bootlegged Minor Threat merchandise, MacKaye and Dischord made arrangements with a merchandise company in California to manage licensing of the band's shirts, as well as working to ensure that bootleg manufacturers of the shirts were curtailed. In comments that appeared in Rolling Stone, MacKaye called it "absurd" for the shirts to be sold for $28 but concluded that "my time is better spent doing other things" than dealing with shirts. Dischord had previously taken action against Forever 21 in 2009 for marketing unlicensed Minor Threat shirts.

== Musical style and legacy ==
Minor Threat are considered to be one of the most influential punk rock bands of the 1980s. Stephen Thomas Erlewine of AllMusic conferred the title of "the definitive Washington, D.C., hardcore punk band" on the group, crediting them for "setting the style for the straight-edge punk movement of the early '80s." Their song "Straight Edge" is also cited regularly as an important in the movement as well. In the book Nothing Feels Good: Punk Rock, Teenagers, and Emo, music critic Andy Greenwald wrote, "Minor Threat found artistry in economy, pumping the bottomless teenaged well of rage − against the establishment, against the cops, against apathy and each other − to fuel blistering, ferociously short sharp sonic shocks in the form of songs. The beats were monochromatic and the instruments were raced as fast as they could possibly go − the goal was catharsis through the passionate expenditure of energy."

In a 2021 interview, Preslar accounted for Minor Threat's full-bodied guitar sound:

I was a really big disciple of Pete Townshend...so the power chord, the full five, six string power chord was a big deal...what I tried to do was play all those strings but play fast, which is what Dr. Know did too...but a lot of people would play just the top two strings...I prided myself on being able to have full chord voicings, which made one guitar sound a little bit more like a couple of guitars.

Preslar also credited the reliability of he and Baker pairing Les Paul guitars with Marshall amps as a crucial factor in the band's sonic presentation, however "tempted" by solid-state amplifiers he was at the time.

Alternative Press named Minor Threat one of the most influential hardcore bands of all time stating that they "created the straight-edge movement" and "their short-lived career will forever be revered by those who follow the same principles." In 2018, Revolver ranked the bands complete anthology as the fifth best punk album of all time writing "Their anthology’s harmonious marriage of fiery punk and pointed emotion laid a blueprint followed by virtually every hardcore band to follow, while the group’s much-espoused clean living inspired a whole straight-edge subculture. Today, it’s a touchstone of American punk."

Bands such as Rage Against the Machine, Good Charlotte, Bad Religion, NOFX, AFI, Rise Against, Agnostic Front, Rocket from the Crypt, Lifetime, Corrosion of Conformity and Thrice have all cited Minor Threat as an influence. Minor Threat along with Black Flag and Hüsker Dü are credited as the hardcore punk bands and post-hardcore bands who influenced early acts in the emo genre. The band has also had their songs covered by various bands such as Foo Fighters and Slayer.

== Members ==
- Ian MacKaye – lead vocals (1980–1983)
- Lyle Preslar – guitars (1980–1983)
- Brian Baker – bass (1980–1982, 1983), guitars (1982–1983)
- Jeff Nelson – drums (1980–1983)
- Steve Hansgen – bass (1982–1983)

== Discography ==
=== EPs ===
- Minor Threat (1981)
- In My Eyes (1981)
- Out of Step (1983)
- Salad Days (1985)

=== Compilations ===
- First Two Seven Inches (1984)
- Complete Discography (1989)
- First Demo Tape (2003)
- Out of Step Outtakes (2023)

=== Live albums ===
- Minor Threat Live (1988)

=== Compilation appearances ===
- Flex Your Head (1982) – "Stand Up", "12XU"
- Dischord 1981: The Year in Seven Inches (1995) contains the first two EPs
- 20 Years of Dischord (2002) – "Screaming at a Wall", "Straight Edge" (live), "Understand", "Asshole Dub"

== See also ==
- List of songs recorded by Minor Threat
