= Dischord Records =

American independent record label

- Founded: 1980
- Founder: Ian MacKaye; Jeff Nelson
- Genre: Punk rock; hardcore punk; post-hardcore; indie rock; emo
- Country of origin: United States
- Location: Washington, D.C.
- Official website: dischord.com

Dischord Records is a Washington, D.C.–based independent record label specializing in punk rock. The label is co-owned by Ian MacKaye and Jeff Nelson, who founded Dischord in 1980 to release Minor Disturbance by their band the Teen Idles. With other independent American labels such as Twin/Tone, Touch and Go Records, and SST Records, Dischord helped to spearhead the nationwide network of underground bands that formed the 1980s indie rock scene. These labels presided over the shift from the hardcore punk that then dominated the American underground scene to the more diverse styles of alternative rock that were emerging.

The label is most notable for employing the do it yourself ethic, producing all of its albums and selling them at discount prices without finance from major distributors. By 2008, Dischord was still releasing records by bands from Washington D.C., and document and support the Washington D.C. music scene. As of October 2016, the label employs four people.

Dischord was a local label in the early days of hardcore.

The logo of the label was created by Nelson, who has an associate degree in advertising design.

== History ==
Influenced by existing labels like Dangerhouse Records, MacKaye and Nelson took up residence in the "Dischord House" and ran the label out of its premises. They founded the label with their Teen Idles bandmates Nathan Strejcek and Geordie Grindle, initially to release their own music.

Dischord's first release was Minor Disturbance by Teen Idles. released in 1980. The band members cut, folded, and glued the record packaging themselves to keep costs down. The label's first split 12" was Faith / Void Split by the bands the Faith and Void.

Dischord limits itself to bands from the D.C. scene. The label offers the same basic deal to all artists: Dischord fronts a certain amount of money to record and manufacture and once those costs are recouped, the label's distributor takes 30 percent of the profit and the band and label split the remainder.

"We don't use contracts, lawyers, any of those kinds of things", MacKaye says. "We are partners – they make the music, and we make the records."

Jeff Nelson has claimed the venture was never intended to be profit-making but was instead simply a way to get their friends albums in fans’ hands.

In spite of criticism over the years about how the label is run, MacKaye claims everything works and will continue to operate in the same fashion of no contracts or lawyers.

"From the beginning of this label, people have said that the way we do things is unsustainable, unrealistic, idealistic, and we were just dreaming", he said. "Well, the dream is now 35 years old, so they can go fuck themselves."

In 2017, they put their catalog on Bandcamp for free streaming or purchase.

Over 40 year of the label, only two bands (Shudder to Think and Jawbox) left for major labels.

In May 2021, it was announced that Dischord would be re-releasing the label's first six 7" records in a remastered box set. With the catalog number "Dischord 200", it consisted of singles and EPs by Minor Threat, Government Issue, Teen Idles, SOA, and Youth Brigade.

== Roster ==
Bands such as Minor Threat, Government Issue, the Faith, Void, Iron Cross, Embrace, Rites of Spring, Nation of Ulysses, Scream, Soulside, S.O.A., the Teen Idles, Gray Matter, Jawbox, Marginal Man, Shudder to Think, Dag Nasty, Lungfish and Fugazi have released records on Dischord.

Additions to the Dischord roster as of the late 1990s and 2000s include Q and Not U, Beauty Pill, Antelope, Soccer Team, French Toast, Faraquet, Black Eyes, the Aquarium, Title Tracks, Edie Sedgwick, Slant 6, and Andalusians. Many of these acts, notably Q and Not U and Black Eyes, are influential and experimental post-hardcore bands.

== Legacy ==
Simple Machines was modeled after Dischord. The founder of Adhyâropa Records Joe Brent was inspired by Dischord's artist-forward approach to label structure.

== References and bibliography ==
- Azerrad, Michael (2001). Our Band Could Be Your Life: Scenes from the American Indie Underground, 1981-1991. New York: Little, Brown and Company. ISBN 0-316-78753-1.
- Blush, Steven (2001). George Petros (ed.). American Hardcore: A Tribal History. Feral House. ISBN 978-0-922915-71-2.
- Cogan, Brian (2008). The Encyclopedia of Punk. New York: Sterling. ISBN 978-1-4027-5960-4.
