= Codeine discography =

Rock band discography

- Codeine performing in 2012
- Studio albums: 3
- EPs: 1
- Live albums: 1
- Compilation albums: 2
- Singles: 9

The discography of the American indie rock band Codeine consists of three studio albums, two compilation albums, a live album, an extended play (EP), and nine singles.

== Albums ==
=== Studio albums ===
List of studio albums
Title	Details	Ref.
Frigid Stars LP	Released: February 1991 (Note: The album was originally released in Europe by Glitterhouse Records. Numero Group stated officially that the album released in February 1991. However, some source, such as the Trouser Press Guide to '90s Rock, mistakenly state that it released in 1990. It was later followed by a domestic release by Sub Pop in May 1991.); Label: Glitterhouse, Sub Pop	
The White Birch	Released: April 4, 1994; Label: Sub Pop	
Dessau	Released: September 16, 2022; Label: Numero Group	

=== Live albums ===
List of live albums
Title	Details	Ref.
What About the Lonely?	Released: April 20, 2013; Label: Numero Group	

=== Compilations ===
List of compilation albums
Title	Details	Ref.
When I See The Sun	Released: June 19, 2012; Label: Sub Pop	
Bigheads Burst	Released: August 2024; Label: Numero Group	

== Extended plays ==
List of extended plays
Title	Details	Ref.
Barely Real	Released: November 1992; Label: Sub Pop	

== Singles ==
List of singles
Title	Year	Album	Ref.
"Pickup Song"	1990	Frigid Stars LP	
"D"	1991	Frigid Stars LP	
"A L'ombre De Nous" (with Bastro)	1991	Non-album single	
"Realize"	1992	Barely Real	
"March"	1993	Working Holiday!	
"Tom"	1993	The White Birch	
"Pickup Song" (live)	2012	What About the Lonely?	
"3 Angels"	2023	Frigid Stars LP	
"Atmosphere"	2024 (Note: Originally appeared in the compilation album A Means to an End: The Music of Joy Division in 1995.)	A Means to an End: The Music of Joy Division	

- Castle/Losida Slide Codeine/Surgery split 7-inch (1990, Glitterhouse)
- Valmead/Pea Bitch Magnet/Codeine split 7-inch and 12-inch (1990, The Communion Label)
- Pickup Song 7-inch (1990, Glitterhouse)
- D 7-inch (1990, Glitterhouse, Sub Pop)
- A L'Ombre De Nous (In Our Shadow)/Produkt Bastro/Codeine split 7-inch (1991, Sub Pop, Glitterhouse)
- Realize/Broken Hearted Wine 7-inch (1992, Sub Pop)
- Sassy Codeine/Velocity Girl/Beat Happening/Sebadoh split 7-inch (1992, Sub Pop)
- Ides/Working Holiday Codeine/The Coctails split 7-inch (1993, Simple Machines)
- Tom/Something New 7-inch (1993, Sub Pop)
