= Anahata (album) =

Studio album by June of 44
- Released: June 10, 1999
- Recorded: January 1999
- Studio: Electrical Audio (Chicago, IL)
- Genre: Post-hardcore, math rock
- Length: 50:21
- Label: Quarterstick
- Producer: Bob Weston

June of 44 chronology
Four Great Points (1998)	Anahata (1999)	In the Fishtank 6 (1999)

Professional ratings
Review scores
Source	Rating
AllMusic	4/5 stars
Alternative Press	3/5 stars
The Encyclopedia of Popular Music	4/5 stars
Pitchfork Media	7.8/10

Anahata is the fourth studio album by Louisville-based math rock band June of 44, released on June 10, 1999, by Quarterstick Records.

== Critical reception ==
Exclaim! called the album June of 44's "most satisfying outing to date, largely because they seem to have refocused their sweat and toil on writing songs — or riffs and motifs, to be more accurate." Portland Mercury wrote that the band perfected "their squirrelly amalgam of post-rock and post-hardcore." The Dallas Observer wrote that "the playing is uniformly excellent ([Doug] Scharin is one of rock's most underrated drummers) but not in the service of any particularly dynamic ideas." CMJ New Music Monthly wrote that the band's "tactic of flatly shouting its lyrics, often in unison, detracts from the musical backdrop."

== Track listing ==
All tracks are written by Fred Erskine, Sean Meadows, Jeff Mueller and Doug Scharin.

No.	Title	Length
1.	"Wear Two Eyes (Boom)"	4:51
2.	"Escape of the Levitational Trapeze Artist"	4:41
3.	"Cardiac Atlas"	5:08
4.	"Equators to Bi-Polar"	6:10
5.	"Recorded Syntax"	5:01
6.	"Southeast of Boston"	5:13
7.	"Five Bucks in My Pocket"	4:06
8.	"Peel Away Velleity"	15:12

== Personnel ==
Adapted from the Anahata liner notes.

June of 44

- Sean Meadows – guitar, bass, vocals
- Jeff Mueller – guitar, vocals
- Fred Erskine – bass, trumpet, keyboards, vocals
- Doug Scharin – drums, keyboards, samples, percussion, vibes

Additional musicians

- Julie Liu – viola (3)
- Chiyoko Yoshida – vocals (6)

Production

- Bob Weston – production, recording, mixing
- Christina Files – recording (5, 6)
- John Golden – mastering

== Release history ==
Region	Date	Label	Format	Catalog
United States	1999	Quarterstick	CD, LP	QS64
