= Dessau (Codeine album) =

2024 album by Codeine

Studio album by Codeine
- Released: September 2, 2022
- Recorded: June 1992
- Studio: Harold Dessau Recording
- Genre: Slowcore, post-rock, indie rock
- Length: 38:10
- Label: The Numero Group
- Producer: Mike McMackin

Codeine chronology
What About the Lonely? (2013)	Dessau (2022)	Split with Bedhead (2024)

Dessau is the third album by American indie rock band Codeine, recorded in 1992 but scrapped before being released by the Numero Group in 2022. Many of the songs presented on the album would be re-recorded either for the album released in Dessau's place, 1994's The White Birch, or for the Barely Real EP in November 1992. The cover art is a painting by Thomas Wilmer Dewing named "The White Birch", a reference to the previously mentioned released album.

== History and background ==
Codeine was formed in 1989 by vocalist and bassist Stephen Immerwahr, guitarist John Engle, and drummer Chris Brokaw. They released their debut album, Frigid Stars LP, in 1990 on Glitterhouse and on Sub Pop the following year.

The album was recorded by Mike McMakin at Harold Dessau Recording in June 1992 over the span of four days. After the recording of the album, Brokaw left the band and the album was scrapped in favor of re-recording the songs for future releases with Doug Scharin from Rex.

The songs "Sea", "Tom", "Wird", and "Smoking Room" would be re-recorded for The White Birch, the album that took Dessau's place. "Realize" and "Jr." were re-recorded for Barely Real. Some of the songs had previously been released on When I See The Sun in 2012.

== Reception ==
Sarah Hennies of NPR said the album "left the feeling I had seen a ghost; Dessau feels like that ghost is in my living room", in reference to how the album felt like The White Birch but different.

== Track listing ==
All tracks are written by Codeine.

Dessau track listing
No.	Title	Length
1.	"Sea"	6:46
2.	"Jr."	3:25
3.	"Tom"	4:13
4.	"I Wonder"	4:38
5.	"Realize"	5:18
6.	"Something New"	5:20
7.	"Wird"	5:24
8.	"Smoking Room"	3:06
Total length:		36:10

== Personnel ==
- Stephen Immerwahr – bass, vocals, liner notes
- John Engle – guitar, liner notes
- Chris Brokaw – drums, liner notes
- Adam Luksetich – project coordinator
- Thomas Wilmer Dewing – cover art
- David Yow – cover art restoration
- Henry Owings – design
- Jeff Lipton – mastering
