= Engine Takes to the Water =

Studio album by June of 44
- Released: June 20, 1995
- Recorded: December 12 – 15, 1994
- Studio: Plantain Recording House (Brooklyn, NY)
- Genre: Post-hardcore, math rock
- Length: 41:08
- Label: Quarterstick

June of 44 chronology
Engine Takes to the Water (1995)	Tropics and Meridians (1996)

Professional ratings
Review scores
Source	Rating
Allmusic	3/5 stars

Engine Takes to the Water is the debut studio album by Louisville-based math rock band June of 44, released on June 20, 1995, by Quarterstick Records.

== Track listing ==
All tracks are written by Fred Erskine, Sean Meadows, Jeff Mueller and Doug Scharin.

No.	Title	Length
1.	"Have a Safe Trip, Dear"	8:25
2.	"June Miller"	3:27
3.	"Pale Horse Sailor"	3:35
4.	"Mindel"	3:25
5.	"I Get My Kicks for You"	6:55
6.	"Mooch"	6:03
7.	"Take It With a Grain of Salt"	5:16
8.	"Sink Is Busted"	4:02

== Credits ==
Adapted from the Engine Takes to the Water liner notes.

June of 44

- Sean Meadows – vocals, electric guitar
- Jeff Mueller – vocals, electric guitar
- Fred Erskine – bass guitar
- Doug Scharin – drums

Production

- James Murphy – recording

== Release history ==
Region	Date	Label	Format	Catalog
United States	1995	Quarterstick	CD, CS, LP	QS32
