= Tropics and Meridians =

Studio album by June of 44
- Released: June 18, 1996
- Recorded: 1996
- Studio: Chicago Recording Company (Chicago, IL)
- Genre: Post-hardcore, math rock
- Length: 36:45
- Label: Quarterstick
- Producer: Bob Weston

June of 44 chronology
Engine Takes to the Water (1996)	Tropics and Meridians (1996)	The Anatomy of Sharks (EP) (1997)

Professional ratings
Review scores
Source	Rating
Allmusic	4/5 stars

Tropics and Meridians is the second studio album by Louisville-based math rock band June of 44, released on June 18, 1996 by Quarterstick Records.

== Track listing ==
All tracks are written by Fred Erskine, Sean Meadows, Jeff Mueller and Doug Scharin.

No.	Title	Length
1.	"Anisette"	9:17
2.	"Lusitania"	2:50
3.	"Lawn Bowler"	7:45
4.	"June Leaf"	5:10
5.	"Arms Over Arteries"	6:31
6.	"Sanctioned in a Birdcage"	5:12

== Personnel ==
Adapted from the Tropics and Meridians liner notes.

June of 44

- Sean Meadows – vocals, electric guitar
- Jeff Mueller – vocals, electric guitar
- Fred Erskine – bass guitar
- Doug Scharin – drums

Production

- Bob Weston – production, recording, mixing

== Release history ==
Region	Date	Label	Format	Catalog
United States	1996	Quarterstick	CD, LP	QS44
