= Four Great Points =

Studio album by June of 44
- Released: January 20, 1998
- Recorded: August 10, 1996 – August 15, 1997
- Studio: Various: Electrical Audio; (Chicago, IL); Sound Techniques; (Boston, MA)
- Genres: Post-hardcore, math rock
- Length: 42:48
- Label: Quarterstick
- Producer: Bob Weston

June of 44 chronology
The Anatomy of Sharks (EP) (1997)	Four Great Points (1998)	Anahata (1999)

Professional ratings
Review scores
Source	Rating
AllMusic	4/5 stars
Pitchfork Media	9.0/10

Four Great Points is the third studio album by the Louisville-based math rock band June of 44, released on January 20, 1998, by Quarterstick Records.

== Critical reception ==
The Chicago Reader called the album "a hypnotic blend of rock, dub, ambient, and orchestral pop," writing that "most of the songs begin with a simple but solid hook; dropped into the harmonic pond it blossoms into a series of variations that move farther and farther from the center." Salon deemed the album "a consistently inventive record, and one that carries a level of emotion that's rare in a genre often plagued with detached, highly textured noodling."

== Track listing ==
All tracks are written by Fred Erskine, Sean Meadows, Jeff Mueller and Doug Scharin.

No.	Title	Length
1.	"Of Information & Belief"	6:57
2.	"The Dexterity of Luck"	6:09
3.	"Cut Your Face"	3:49
4.	"Doomsday"	4:20
5.	"Does Your Heart Beat Slower"	4:22
6.	"Lifted Bells"	6:25
7.	"Shadow Pugilist"	3:57
8.	"Air #17"	6:49

== Personnel ==
Adapted from the Four Great Points liner notes.

June of 44

- Sean Meadows – guitar, vocals, bells, staircase
- Jeff Mueller – guitar, vocals, Moog synthesizer
- Fred Erskine – bass guitar, trumpet, wood, steel pole
- Doug Scharin – drums, percussion, Moog synthesizer, samples

Additional musicians

- Julie Liu – violin (1, 5)
- Bundy K. Brown – electronics (5)

Production

- Bob Weston – production, recording, mixing
- Geoff Sykes – mastering

== Release history ==
Region	Date	Label	Format	Catalog
United States	1998	Quarterstick	CD, LP	QS54
