= Canyon (indie rock band) =

- Origin: Washington, D.C., United States
- Genres: Indie rock Slowcore
- Years active: 1999–present
- Labels: Gern Blandsten Records; DCN Records; Wichita Recordings

Canyon was an American slowcore band from Washington, D.C., United States. Their style was heavily influenced by Americana, folk and country music.

== History ==
The band was formed in 1999 after ex-Boys Life member Brandon Butler relocated from Kansas to the Washington, D.C. area and briefly fronted the band Farewell Bend. Originally playing shows under the moniker Vita Bruno, the initial Canyon lineup consisted of members from several influential DC post-hardcore bands including John Wall from Kerosene 454 and Vin Novara from the Crownhate Ruin. The band released their first LP in 2001 on John Wall's Slowdime Records and toured nationally afterwards.

By the time the record was released, fellow Boys Life member Joe Winkle had arrived in D.C., prompting a lineup shift that saw the departure of Wall and Novara, along with the addition of keyboardist Derry deBorja, bassist Evan Berodt, and drummer Dave Bryson. The self-titled album was picked up and re-released by Gern Blandsten Records, who also released their second full-length, "Empty Rooms", in 2002. Further touring ensued, including an opening slot for former Uncle Tupelo/Son Volt member Jay Farrar, and the recording of a live album for DCN Records.

The Canyon song "Mansion on the Mountain ('Live in NYC' version)", from "Empty Rooms", is in the default library for Windows XP and subsequent versions of Windows.

On November 19, 2010, Canyon reunited as a four-piece featuring Butler, Winkle, and a supporting rhythm section, to play at the Black Cat in Washington DC. deBorja, Berodt, and Bryson were not featured in this reunion.

== Connections ==
Derry deBorja, Evan Berodt, and Dave Bryson later played with the DC-based Americana outfit Revival before deBorja and Bryson joined Son Volt as full-time members. Brandon Butler continues to play solo and with a backing band; he has released two albums for Gypsy Eyes Records, "Killer on the Road" and later "Lucky Thumbs." Vin Novara played with the DC band Perfect Souvenir, and is again playing with 1.6 Band. deBorja has been playing with Jason Isbell and the 400 Unit since 2013.

== Members ==
- Brandon Butler - guitar, lap steel, harmonica
- John Wall - vocals, bass
- Joe Winkle - guitar, harmonium, lap steel
- Derry deBorja - Fender Rhodes, keyboards, accordion
- Evan Berodt - bass guitar
- Vin Novara - percussion
- Dave Bryson - percussion
- Amy Heath - trumpet
- Yalan Papillons - vocals
- Michael Pahn - hand claps

== Discography ==
- Canyon (Slowdime Records, 2001; re-released on Gern Blandsten Records)
- Empty Rooms (Gern Blandsten, 2002)
- Live in NYC (DCN Records, 2003)
- Ten Good Eyes EP (Wichita Recordings, 2005)
