= The White Birch (album) =

Studio album by Codeine
- Released: April 4, 1994
- Recorded: August and December 1993
- Studio: Idful, Chicago; 3-Communications, Middletown, Connecticut; Mike and Rick's, New York City
- Genre: Indie rock, slowcore
- Length: 43:11
- Label: Sub Pop
- Producer: Codeine, Mike McMackin

Codeine chronology
Barely Real (1992)	The White Birch (1994)

The White Birch is the second album by the New York City band Codeine. Released in April 1994, the album is considered by many to be the band's best album and a clear influence on Low, among other bands. It was the band's last album released during their original run; the band disbanded for the first time after the tour for the album.

== Background ==
On their debut album Frigid Stars LP and the follow-on EP Barely Real, Codeine's sound was characterised by agonizingly slow tempos and a stripped-down aesthetic, their songs rarely venturing beyond the combination of a sharp, robust rhythm section underlying crisply ringing guitars. The White Birch introduced more melodic elements and developed an aesthetic that shifted sharply between clean and heavily distorted guitars in a way that few bands such as Slint had previously explored. Along with Slint's 1991 album Spiderland, The White Birch would prove to be a huge influence on bands such as Mogwai and Shipping News.

Following an extensive US tour, the band split up. Scharin returned to Rex, before working with HiM and June of 44. Immerwahr formed a new band, Raymond.

== Songs ==
An alternative version of "Ides" was released as a 7-inch split single with The Coctails on Simple Machines in 1993. "Tom" was released as a 7-inch single on Sub Pop in 1993, backed with "Something New". "Wird" is a full-band version of "W.", which previously appeared as a piano piece on Barely Real.

== Reception ==
Professional ratings
Review scores
Source	Rating
AllMusic	3.5/5 stars
Pitchfork	8.4/10
Select	3/5
Spin	9/10

In a contemporary review, Select stated that "As Codeine transplant rock from the nightclub to the monastery, they're producing something as disconsolate yet numbingly beautiful as a gang of monks laying down some plainsong remixes of American Music Club's greatest hits. It's a strategy that has more to do with beats per millennium than minute, but this a trance music nonetheless."

== Track listing ==
All tracks are written by Codeine

No.	Title	Length
1.	"Sea"	7:21
2.	"Loss Leader"	4:18
3.	"Vacancy"	3:37
4.	"Kitchen Light"	3:36
5.	"Washed Up"	4:40
6.	"Tom"	5:02
7.	"Ides"	5:07
8.	"Wird"	6:05
9.	"Smoking Room"	3:18

== Personnel ==
- John Engle – guitar
- Stephen Immerwahr – bass, vocals
- Doug Scharin – drums
- David Grubbs – guitar on "Tom" and "Wird"
