= The Anatomy of Sharks (EP) =

EP by June of 44
- Released: January 21, 1997
- Recorded: January 1996
- Genre: Post-hardcore, math rock
- Length: 22:48
- Label: Quarterstick
- Producer: Bob Weston

June of 44 chronology
| Tropics and Meridians (1996) | The Anatomy of Sharks (1997) | Four Great Points (1998) |

Professional ratings
Review scores
| Source | Rating |
|---|---|
| Alternative Press | 3/5 stars |

The Anatomy of Sharks is an EP by Louisville-based math rock band June of 44, released on January 21, 1997, by Quarterstick Records.

== Track listing ==
All tracks are written by Fred Erskine, Sean Meadows, Jeff Mueller and Doug Scharin.

| No. | Title | Length |
|---|---|---|
| 1. | "Sharks & Sailors" | 11:15 |
| 2. | "Boom" | 4:58 |
| 3. | "Seemingly Endless Steamer" | 6:35 |

== Personnel ==
Adapted from The Anatomy of Sharks liner notes.

June of 44

- Sean Meadows – vocals, electric guitar
- Jeff Mueller – vocals, electric guitar
- Fred Erskine – bass guitar; trumpet (2), vocals (3)
- Doug Scharin – drums

Production

- Bob Weston – production, recording, mixing

== Release history ==
| Region | Date | Label | Format | Catalog |
|---|---|---|---|---|
| United States | 1996 | Quarterstick | CD, LP | QS40 |
