= Slowdime Records =

American record label

Slowdime Records was a record label started in 1996 by Juan Luis Carrera and Amanda MacKaye. The label was originally started, according to a label bio, “with the intent to document the new inclinations and innovations that began to surface within the Washington D.C. independent music scene,” but it eventually came to release records from bands based in cities all over the world. The origin of the label's name is a reversal of the popular aphorism, "A quick nickel is better than a slow dime."

Within a short time, Amanda MacKaye became less involved and John Wall, who was playing in Kerosene 454 at the time, started running the label with Juan.

A number of the label’s releases were “split” releases with another D.C.-centric label, Dischord Records. Slowdime’s releases were catalogued with the initials “SD” and a number. There were 35 Slowdime releases in all, on LP, CD, 12” single, and 7” single formats.

The label’s final release was the album “Music Out of Music” by Bologna, Italy’s Three Second Kiss.

The label’s owners were musicians themselves: Carrera served as the bassist for D.C. punks The Warmers, John Wall played bass in Kerosene 454 and Canyon, and Amanda MacKaye was a member of the Routineers.

Carrera now serves as the manager for a number of internationally touring acts, including Modest Mouse and Bright Eyes.

== Slowdime discography ==
- SD1) Metamatics - "Metamatics"
- SD2) Regulator Watts "New Lo Moline" 7" co-released with Dischord Records (107.5)
- SD3) Kerosene 454 "Came By To Kill Me" co-released with Dischord Records (111.5)
- SD4) Regulator Watts "Mercury" EP co-released with Dischord Records (113.5)
- SD5) All Scars – "All Scars"
- SD6) Regulator Watts – “The Aesthetics of No Drag”
- SD7) Meltdown – Senior Year Was the Best 7”
- SD9) Hoover – "Hoover" EP
- SD10) Regulator Watts – “The Mercury”
- SD11) Kerosene 454 – “At Zero”
- SD12) The Boom – “Movin’ Out”
- SD13) The Sorts – “More There”
- SD14) The Farewell Bend – "The Farewell Bend" 7”
- SD15) The Most Secret Method – “Get Lovely”
- SD16) Make-Up/Crainium split 7”
- SD17) The Crainium – “A New Music for a New Kitchen”
- SD18) The Farewell Bend – “In Passing”
- SD19) The Boom – “Any Day of the Night”
- SD20) Make-Up "Every Baby Cries The Same 7""
- SD21) Golden – “Super Golden Original Movement”
- SD22) Victory at Sea – “The Dark is Just the Night”
- SD23) Three Second Kiss – “Focal Point”
- SD24) Crom-Tech – "Crom-Tech"
- SD25) All Scars – “Introduction to Humanity”
- SD26) Golden – “Golden and the Rhythm Beat Jazz”
- SD27) The Sorts – “Contemporary Music”
- SD28) Golden – “Summer”
- SD29) Bluetip – “Hot Fast Union” EP
- SD30) HiM – "Our Point of Departure"
- SD31) Canyon – "Canyon"
- SD32) Abilene – "Abilene"
- SD33) Pines of Nowhere – "Pines of Nowhere"
- SD34) Victory at Sea – “Carousel”
- SD35) Three Second Kiss – “Music Out of Music”

== See also ==
- List of record labels
