= In the Fishtank 6 =

Live album by June of 44
- Released: 1999
- Recorded: February 1999
- Venue: Koeienverhuur
- Genre: Indie rock, math rock
- Length: 27:47
- Label: Konkurrent Records

June of 44 chronology
Anahata (1999)	In the Fishtank 6 (1999)	Revisionist: Adaptations & Future Histories in the Time of Love and Survival (2020)

In the Fishtank chronology
In the Fishtank 5 (1999)	In the Fishtank 6 (1999)	In the Fishtank 7 (2001)

Professional ratings
Review scores
Source	Rating
Allmusic	4/5 stars

In the Fishtank 6 is the recording of a live session in a Dutch studio by Louisville-based math rock band June of 44.

== Track listing ==
1. "Pregenerate" (4:18)
2. "Generate" (4:18)
3. "Henry's Revenge" (3:27)
4. "Modern Hereditary Dance Steps" (5:36)
5. "Every Free Day A Good Day" (4:06)
6. "Degenerate" (6:07)

== Personnel ==
June of 44

- Sean Meadows – guitar; vocals (2)
- Jeff Mueller – guitar; vocals (2)
- Fred Erskine – bass, keyboards
- Doug Scharin – drums, keyboards, samples

Production

- Zlaya Hadzic – engineering, mastering
- Isabelle Vigier – original artwork
