= Garden Variety (band) =

American post-hardcore band

- Origin: Long Island, New York, U.S.
- Genres: Post-hardcore, emo
- Years active: 1991–1996
- Labels: Gern Blandsten, Cargo, Headhunter, MintTone, Reservoir, Cargo, Montalban Hotel, Big Wheel Recreation
- Spinoffs: Rockets Red Glare; Bluetip
- Past members: Anthony Roman; Anthony Rizzo; Joe Gorelick

Garden Variety was an American post-hardcore band active in the 1990s. Their sound drew on a wide variety of established underground acts such as Soul Asylum, Squirrel Bait, and Jawbox.

During their time together, the band released several 7-inch singles and two LPs: a self-titled album in 1993 and Knocking the Skill Level in 1994. The group disbanded in 1996.

== History ==
In 1991, Anthony Roman and Anthony Rizzo posted an ad in a Long Island punk zine asking for a drummer who was interested in making music. Joe Gorelick saw the ad, and the trio rehearsed. The chemistry between the two were "perfect", and the band began writing music, playing shows, and touring with bands like Dahlia Seed, Native Nod, Hoover, and others. Garden Variety appeared on a SoundViews magazine CD compilation, and with Pavement and many others on the famous Homage Descendents tribute CD. They were interviewed by actress Janeane Garofalo on the 1995 "7-Up listen up" series (in studio interview and recordings), appeared on the Lookout Records compilation Punk Rock USA alongside Jawbreaker, appeared with Texas is the Reason, Quicksand and many more on the Anti Matter CD/vinyl compilation (as well as the Anti Matter book), and on several other VHS video compilations during 1995/1996. In 1996, Vogue magazine interviewed the band for its Spring 1996 issue. In late 1996, the band had trouble writing new material, couldn't agree on a direction to go in, and weren't getting along, which led to their breakup that year.

== Post break-up ==
Anthony Rizzo played with Rockets Red Glare and played guitar for Radio 4. He has also played and recorded with members of The Bogmen in the band Vic Thrill. He has also played in Little Embers, a band formed with his wife Theresa Hoffman. He also composed the main theme for the IFC show Maron.

Joe Gorelick played and recorded with Bluetip, Sugarhigh, The St. James Stars, Retisonic, Marah, and Red Hare.

== Band personnel ==
- Anthony Roman – bass, vocals
- Anthony Rizzo – guitar
- Joe Gorelick – drums, backing vocals

== Discography ==
=== Albums ===
- Garden Variety (1993, Gern Blandsten)
- Knocking The Skill Level (1995, Cargo/Headhunter)

=== Singles & EPs ===
- Hedge (1992, MintTone)
- Split with Dahlia Seed (1994, MintTone)
- Split with Hell No (1995, Reservoir)
- Split with Chune (1995, Cargo)
- Split with Jejune (1997, Montalban Hotel Records/Big Wheel Recreation)
