= Regulator Watts =

Post-hardcore band from Washington, D.C.

Regulator Watts was a rock band from Washington, D.C. that was active from 1995 to 1997. The group mixed elements of post-hardcore, emo, math rock, and dub reggae. Stereogum described them as "a driving and mathy power trio [that] didn't last long."

Following an EP and a single, they released a full-length album, The Aesthetics of No-Drag, in 1997. After the band's breakup, The Mercury CD was released in 1998, which compiled non-album releases and outtakes.

Regulator Watts' music resembled that of guitarist/vocalist Alex Dunham's previous band, Hoover -- whose song "Regulator Watts" was also the source of the newer band's name -- but with an emphasis on taut, mechanical basslines and feedback-laden, spare guitar lines, as opposed to Hoover's fluid, jazzy basslines and contrasting guitar styles.

== History ==
Following the break-up of Hoover in mid-1994, Dunham worked on new music and sought, without initial success, to start a new band in his home base of Washington, D.C. In April 1995, Dunham traveled to Chicago, Illinois, for a one-week musical collaboration with members of the post-hardcore band Gauge. This project, dubbed Radio Flyer, played a single show at a Knights of Columbus Hall in Arlington Heights, Illinois, on April 15, 1995, and recorded their entire musical output of seven songs the following day before disbanding. That album, In Their Strange White Armor, was released posthumously by Polyvinyl Records on March 4, 1997.

Around the time of the Radio Flyer project in 1995, Dunham and bassist Cret Wilson were introduced by the musician and graphic designer, Jason Farrell (Swiz, Bluetip). Dunham and Wilson briefly formed the band Mercurochrome with former Circus Lupus and Antimony drummer, Arika Casebolt. After writing "about six or seven songs," according to Dunham, Mercurochrome played a few concerts before disbanding when Casebolt moved away from Washington, D.C.

The drummer Arief Sless-Kitain moved to Washington, D.C., in 1995 to attend college and was soon introduced to Dunham and Wilson by the musician and producer Juan Carrera (of the Warmers and Slowdime Records), which led to the formation of Regulator Watts that same year. The trio's debut concert was on December 31, 1995 at the Black Cat club in Washington, D.C., alongside fellow D.C. punk bands Branch Manager and The Norman Mayer Group.

The group primarily released its recorded output through Slowdime Records and were described by The Washington City Paper as part of that label's "muscley rawk [sic] brigade, made up of hardcore vets flexing their artistic heads," along with labelmates Kerosene 454.

Most of the group's recordings were produced by the musician Geoff Turner (of the bands Gray Matter, Senator Flux, and Three) at his studio, WGNS. Wilson and Sless-Kitain acknowledged Turner's contributions to the recordings, noting that he was "all over" The Mercury EP and The Aesthetics of No-Drag and was "so great" to work with, letting the band "feel that we had a sense of play," leading to a sense of freedom and experimentation in the sessions.

Regulator Watts broke up at the end of 1997, their final show occurring on December 5 at the Black Cat, the same venue that hosted their debut. Dunham subsequently formed the band, Abilene, while Sless-Kitain went on to play with Bluetip, Brokeback, Radio International, and the Eternals.

== Reception ==
Yancey Strickler of AllMusic described The Aesthetics of No-Drag as a "fine example of the D.C. hardcore sound" which "borrows heavily from Fugazi (like all D.C. artists), as well as the Chicago post-Naked Raygun punk template to make a record that is as satisfying as it is uninhibited."

John Davis of The Diamondback wrote approvingly of the "beautifully packaged" artwork of The Aesthetics of No-Drag, also noting that "the album starts off with three incredible songs [which] all contain the elements that make Regulator a band worth your time -- mad time signatures, intense vocals, the occasional head-bobbing groove and, once in a while, a damn good melody."

In a retrospective review, Soft Riot observed that "Seed Tick," a track from The Aesthetics of No-Drag, sounded "like the band at times is playing in some large, cavernous warehouse on 'the other side of town,' evoking the feeling [of] driving down a deserted road somewhere in Nowhere, America in deep evening fog." The review cites the music of the Birthday Party and the film noir-informed movies of David Lynch and the Coen Brothers as aesthetic brethren to Regulator Watts' "lush, atmospheric approach" and its "tapping into [a] darker thread of Americana."

A review in the punk fanzine Deal With It also noticed the cinematic element of Regulator Watts' sound, comparing it to Neil Young's soundtrack for the Jim Jarmusch film, Dead Man.

== Members ==
- Alex Dunham (guitar/vocals)
- Areif Dasha Sless-Kitain (drums)
- Cret Wilson (bass/vocals)

== Discography ==
=== Albums ===
- The Aesthetics of No-Drag (Dischord/Slowdime, LP/CD, 1997; reissued by Solid Brass Records, 2026)

=== EPs ===
- The Mercury EP (Dischord/Broken Press, 12-inch EP, 1996)
- kWh EP (Solid Brass Records., 12-inch EP, 2026)

=== Singles ===
- "New Low Moline" (Dischord/Slowdime, 7-inch single, 1997)
- Regulator Watts / Stinking Lizaveta (French Lick, split 7-inch, 1998)

=== Compilations ===
- The Mercury CD (Slowdime, CD, 1998; reissued by BCore Records in 2017 and Solid Brass Records in 2025)
  - Includes The Mercury EP, both singles, and other non-album tracks.
