= The Anatomy of Sharks =

The Anatomy of Sharks may refer to:

- Shark anatomy, article on the anatomy of the sea creature
- The Anatomy of Sharks (EP), an EP by June of 44
