= The Lurid Traversal of Route 7 =

Studio album by Hoover
- Released: 1994
- Recorded: August 1993
- Genre: Post-hardcore, emo, indie rock
- Length: 59:55
- Label: Dischord

Hoover chronology
The Lurid Traversal of Route 7 (1994)	Hoover (1998)

The Lurid Traversal of Route 7 is the debut album by American post-hardcore band Hoover, released in 1994 on Dischord Records. The album was reissued in 2005, containing 3 additional tracks.

== Reception ==
Professional ratings
Review scores
Source	Rating
AllMusic	3/5 stars

Ned Raggett of AllMusic compared the sound to the band Drive Like Jehu, stating that "Hoover are out for blood and sound it: musical aggression amped up high, lyrics clipped, and vocals screamed in usually very high pitches." Jason Heller of The A.V. Club described the album as "Fugazi possessed by demons", and called it "one of 1995’s—and the decade’s—singular, eerie post-hardcore [albums]." Noel Gardner of The Quietus noted the albums's "rhythmic fluidity and atmospheric anguish". Briony Edwards of Louder stated that the album shifts between "tight, groove-laden jams" and "furious bursts of musical chaos", which results to a "clawing sense of urgency". Brandon Gentry described the album as "60 minutes of blistering brilliance thriving on tension and release".

Vulture listed "Electrolux" as number 86 of the 100 greatest emo songs.

== Track listing ==
No.	Title	Length
1.	"Distant"	3:12
2.	"Pretender"	6:09
3.	"Electrolux"	7:09
4.	"Shut"	4:14
5.	"Route 7"	3:59
6.	"Regulator Watts"	4:58
7.	"Father"	4:56
8.	"Cable"	3:51
9.	"Letter"	5:50
10.	"Cuts Like Drugs"	7:23

Bonus tracks (2005 reissue)
No.	Title	Length
11.	"Return"	2:54
12.	"Private"	3:21
13.	"Dries"	5:00

== Credits ==
- Joseph McRedmond – guitar, vocals
- Fred Erskine – bass, vocals
- Alex Dunham – guitar, vocals
- Christopher Farral – drums
