= Jeff Mueller =

American vocalist and guitarist

- Born
- Genres: Math rock, post-hardcore, post-rock
- Occupation: Musician
- Instruments: Guitar, vocals
- Years active: 1991–present

Jeff Mueller is an American vocalist and guitarist best known as a member of the math rock bands Rodan, Shipping News and June of 44. His bands have been critically recognized for being key forerunners in the development of post-rock, math rock and post-hardcore. Additionally, Mueller released a single solo album, entitled Fold and Perish, in 1999 on Monitor Records. He lives in New Haven, Connecticut.

== Biography ==
Mueller attended college at Kansas City, Missouri at the Art Institute of Kansas City for two years. While in high school, Mueller struck up a bond with guitarist Jason Noble, who shared his musical interests. In 1991 they founded the Hip Hop project King G & the J Krew. Along with Noble, Jeff Mueller founded the band Rodan in Louisville, Kentucky in 1992. The group released one album for Quarterstick Records, titled Rusty, in 1994. After Rodan dissolved in 1995, Mueller formed June of 44 with bassist Fred Erskine, drummer Doug Scharin and guitarist Sean Meadows. After 1999, the band would lay dormant for 19 years until their reunion in 2019. In 1996, he formed Shipping News with former Rodan bandmate Jason Noble. Shipping News disbanded immediately following the death of Noble in 2012.

In 2025, Mueller collaborated with Meadows to form Flowting Clowds (stylized as FLOWTING CLOWDS). Their first single "There are Rivers" along with a cover of Love and Rockets' "Earth, Sun, Moon" was made available on Bandcamp, and released on vinyl on November 14, 2025.

== Discography ==
=== Solo ===
- Fold and Perish (Monitor, 1999)
- Amid Life Crisis (Self-released, 2020)

=== with Rodan ===
==== Albums ====
- Rusty (Quarterstick, 1993)

==== Singles and EPs ====
- How The Winter Was Passed (Three Little Girls, 1993)
- Aviary E.P. (Hell N Ready, 1993)

=== with June Of 44 ===
==== Albums ====
- Engine Takes To Water (Quarterstick, 1995)
- Tropics and Meridians (Quarterstick, 1996)
- Four Great Points (Quarterstick, 1998)
- Anahata (Quarterstick, 1999)
- Revisionist: Adaptations and Future Histories In The Time Of Love And Survival (Broken Clover, 2020)
- Live In Tokyo (Imakinn, 2026)

==== EPs ====
- The Anatomy Of Sharks (Quarterstick, 1997)
- In The Fishtank 6 (Konkurrent, 1999)

=== with Shipping News ===
==== Albums ====
- Save Everything (Quarterstick, 1997)
- Very Soon, And In Pleasant Company (Quarterstick, 2001)
- Three-Four (Quarterstick, 2003)
- Flies The Fields (Quarterstick, 2005)
- One Less Heartless To Fear (Karate Body, 2010)

==== Singles and EPs ====
- Metroschifter and Shipping News (Initial, 1998)
- Claws (Quarterstick, 2006)
- Take A Deep Breath (Self-released, 2010)

=== with Flowting Clowds ===
==== Singles ====
- Earth, Sun, Moon / There Are Rivers (Landland Colportage, 2025)
- Songs of Protest and Hope (Landland Colportage, 2026)

=== with Per Mission ===
==== Albums ====
- A Ritual Loop (Monitor, 2001)
- Skull Drones (Public Noise Private Noise, 2011)
- Skull Drones Part 2 (Public Noise Private Noise, 2011)

=== Other Credits ===
- Handwriting LP by Rachel's (1995)
- "Scooby Doo" by Aden (1997)
- "The Hem Around Us" by Shannon Wright (2001)
