= The Capitol City Dusters =

American post-hardcore band

Background information
- Also known as: The Dusters
- Origin: Washington, D.C., United States
- Genre: Post-hardcore
- Years active: 1996–2003
- Labels: Superbad; Dischord
- Past members: Alec Bourgeois; Bill Colgrove; Ben Azzara; Mark Lacrasse; Jesse Quitsland

The Capitol City Dusters (also known as The Dusters) were an American post -hardcore band formed in Washington, D.C., in 1996. The group's 1998 debut album combined elements of the hardcore punk movement in D.C., as well as sentiments reminiscent of the first wave of punk music. In 2002, after a brief hiatus, the band released a second full-length, Rock Creek.

== History ==
Originally known as the Dusters, the band formed in Washington, D.C., featuring the trio of Alec Bourgeois (lead guitar, vocals), Bill Colgrove (bass guitar, vocals), and Ben Azzara (drums). All three possessed experience in earlier punk bands, including Bourgeois' group Severin — which released an album and several singles on Dischord Records in the early 1990s — Azzara's the Delta 72, and Colgrove's New York–based band, Foundation. The trio made its live debut at the Black Cat nightclub on June 2, 1996, sharing the bill with Regulator Watts and the Most Secret Method.

In October 1996, the Dusters released the single, "Forest Fire," backed with "Seventeen", on Superbad Records, a record label operated by Bourgeois and distributed by Dischord Records. In early 1997, three songs by the band were featured on a split EP with fellow D.C. group, the Most Secret Method. The EP was also a co-release of Superbad and Dischord Records.

Shortly after the split EP was distributed, Colgrove departed the Dusters to establish a web design business, Threespot Media. Mark Lacrasse joined the band briefly as the Dusters' guest bassist to record their debut studio album, Simplicity. It was released in October 1998 under the name the Capitol City Dusters to avoid confusion between the D.C. band and similarly named groups. According to the British punk fanzine Fear and Loathing, Simplicity possessed "a simpler, at times melodic, at other times harder sounding post-punk hybrid. Something like Jawbox at their more inventive."

After recruiting bassist Jesse Quitsland, the band embarked on a US tour in late 1998 and early 1999 followed by a European tour accompanied with Spanish band Aina. The two acts concluded the tour with a split single, and the Capitol City Dusters took a year-long hiatus to rest from their hectic scheduling.

By 2001, the band returned from their break to record their second album Rock Creek, released in April 2002. Recognized as a concept album, Allison Fields of Pitchfork noted Rock Creek possesses influences from Fugazi on several tracks, most notably the opening song "Superimposed". The styles of the band, as music critic Jimmy Askew wrote for Snap Pop magazine, perfected the blend "between Quitslund’s quirky arrangements and guitarist Alec Bourgeois’ straightforward pop". Reception of the album was generally positive, as several reviews pointed to Rock Creek's stylistic similarities to early 1990s D.C. hardcore.

To support the release of Rock Creek, the Capitol City Dusters conducted extensive tours throughout the US and Europe, often with Aina, throughout the year. Although the album and tour were the group's most successful to date, they disbanded in 2003.
