= Fifteen Quiet Years =

Compilation album by Rodan
- Released: June 11, 2013
- Recorded: 1992–1994
- Genre: Post-hardcore, math rock
- Length: 48:25
- Label: Quarterstick

Rodan chronology
| Rusty (1994) | Fifteen Quiet Years (2013) |

Professional ratings
Review scores
| Source | Rating |
|---|---|
| AllMusic | 4/5 stars |
| Tom Hull | A− |
| Paste | 8.2/10 |
| Pitchfork | 8.0/10 |
| PopMatters | 8/10 |

Fifteen Quiet Years is a compilation album by American math rock band Rodan, released on June 11, 2013, through Quarterstick Records. It consists of several tracks originally released only on compilations as well as recordings from the band's BBC session with John Peel. All the songs have been newly mastered by Bob Weston for their inclusion in Fifteen Quiet Years. All formats include a digital download of ten bonus live tracks.

== Track listing ==
All tracks are written by Rodan.

| No. | Title | Length |
|---|---|---|
| 1. | "Darjeeling" | 4:09 |
| 2. | "Milk and Melancholy" | 3:11 |
| 3. | "Tron" | 2:27 |
| 4. | "Shiner" | 2:23 |
| 5. | "Tooth Fairy" | 5:42 |
| 6. | "Exoskeleton" | 7:34 |
| 7. | "Sangre" | 6:22 |
| 8. | "Big Things, Small Things" | 5:52 |
| 9. | "Before the Train" | 10:45 |
| Total length: | | 48:31 |

Bonus live download ('93/'94 tour)
| No. | Title | Length |
|---|---|---|
| 1. | "Tooth Fairy Retribution" (The Black Cat, Washington, DC) | 6:46 |
| 2. | "Wurl" (The Flying Squire, Danbury, CT) | 7:19 |
| 3. | "Big Things, Small Things / Martin" (40 Watt Club, Athens, GA) | 14:15 |
| 4. | "Before the Train" (Lounge Ax, Chicago, IL) | 12:05 |
| 5. | "Milk and Melancholy" (Lounge Ax, Chicago, IL) | 4:25 |
| 6. | "Wurl" (Our House Cafe, Costa Mesa, CA) | 6:44 |
| 7. | "Darjeeling" (Thunderdome, Louisville, KY) | 5:01 |
| 8. | "Big Things, Small Things" (The Black Cat, Washington, DC) | 5:52 |
| 9. | "Exoskeleton" (Twice Told Books, Louisville, KY) | 6:50 |
| 10. | "Rocket House pre-show" (Louisville, KY) | 1:16 |
| Total length: | | 70:33 |

== Personnel ==
Rodan

- Jeff Mueller – guitar, vocals, remastering
- Jason B. Noble – guitar, vocals, remastering
- Tara Jane O'Neil – bass guitar, guitar, vocals
- Jon Cook – drums (1–5)
- John Weiss – drums (6)
- Kevin Coultas – drums (7–9, bonus live recordings)

Production and additional personnel

- David Babbitt – cover art
- Lance Bangs – engineering
- Julia Carney – engineering
- Ted de Bono – engineering
- Forrest French – engineering
- Steve Good – engineering
- Aadam Jacobs – engineering
- Patrick Klem – engineering
- Kevin Ratterman – mastering
- Cory Rayborn – engineering
- Rodan – mastering
- Bob Weston – remastering
