= Codeine (band) =

American indie rock band

- Codeine playing one of their first reunion shows at I'll Be Your Mirror, Alexandra Palace, London, May 2012

Background information
- Origin: New York City, United States
- Genres: Indie rock; post-rock; slowcore
- Works: Codeine discography
- Years active: 1989–1994; 2012; 2023-2024
- Labels: Sub Pop; Glitterhouse; Numero
- Members: Stephen Immerwahr; John Engle; Chris Brokaw
- Past members: Doug Scharin
- Website: https://codeine.nyc

Codeine is an American indie rock band formed in 1989 in New York City. They released two full-length albums—Frigid Stars LP in 1990 and The White Birch in 1994. Although the group broke up in 1994 shortly after the release of The White Birch, their subdued and melancholic style helped pioneer the then-nascent slowcore subgenre of indie rock. Codeine reunited briefly for shows in 2012 in support of re-issues by Numero Group, and more recently from 2023 onward (including sold-out shows in New York City, London, Paris, and Tokyo; as well as shows in Mexico, Chile, and Brazil). A substantial number of shows is planned for 2027.

== History ==
Codeine was formed by members Stephen Immerwahr (vocals, bass), Chris Brokaw (drums), and John Engle (guitar). Codeine pioneered the indie rock subgenre slowcore, but with a more experimental attitude than other bands in the genre, such as Low, Idaho and Red House Painters. The band's original tone, marked by slow tempos, Immerwahr's nasal vocals, and Engle's ringing Telecaster, stayed consistent during their career.

Codeine released their first album Frigid Stars LP on the German label Glitterhouse in August 1990. The album was released on Sub Pop early the following year.

The Barely Real EP was released in November 1992. Immerwahr rejected several of the songs after the recording session. Some of these songs would be re-recorded for the final album. The song "W." is a solo performance on piano by David Grubbs (of Bastro, Squirrel Bait and Gastr del Sol). A full-band version of the song appears on Codeine's next album, now titled "Wird".

Brokaw left the band after the release of Barely Real to play full-time with his other band Come, and after Josh Madell of Antietam replaced him temporarily for a US tour, he was replaced permanently by Rex drummer Doug Scharin.

Codeine's final release was the full-length album The White Birch, released in May 1994. David Grubbs also participated on the album. After this release, the band broke up. Doug Scharin continued in Rex and June of 44, and later as the band leader of HiM. Following the demise of Come, original drummer Chris Brokaw became a solo artist and itinerant musician, including playing drums for the New Year and playing guitar with Thurston Moore of Sonic Youth and with Christina Rosenvinge.

=== Reunion ===
In February 2012, Codeine announced it would perform on the request of Mogwai at All Tomorrow's Parties' sister event, I'll Be Your Mirror on May 26, 2012, in London at Alexandra Palace, along with other shows, to commemorate a comprehensive reissue of their recordings by the Numero Group in June 2012. Codeine's final reunion show was at Le Poisson Rouge in New York on July 15, 2012.

In September 2022, the band released Dessau, an album of 8 songs recorded at Harold Dessau Recording in 1992 that was originally intended to appear on their second album but was scrapped due to production conflicts. Chris Brokaw would leave the band shortly after the album was shelved. Two songs from these sessions would be re-recorded and released on Barely Real, others re-recorded for The White Birch; four songs from the Dessau sessions were first released on their 2012 compilation When I See the Sun.

Codeine's first show in 11 years took place in New York City's Union Pool on February 11, 2023, prior to playing the Numero Group's 20th anniversary festival in Los Angeles on February 18 and 19. Additional shows took place later that year throughout Europe and the US. The following Spring the band played shows in Canada, Australia, Japan, and Mexico. A 2027 European tour was announced in late 2026.

== Discography ==
- Frigid Stars LP (1991)
- The White Birch (1994)
- Dessau (2022)
