= Kevin McManus =

Kevin McManus may refer to:

- Kevin McManus (politician), American politician from Missouri
- Kevin McManus (filmmaker), American filmmaker
- Kevin McManus (guitarist), of Dahlia Seed
