= Three sheets to the wind =

Three sheets to the wind is an idiomatic term referring to being drunk or intoxicated. The phrase has nautical origins, suggesting a sail with three sheets (rope) loose and blowing in the wind is out of control.

Three sheets to the wind can also refer to:

- Three Sheets to the Wind (album), by the band Idaho
- A song on the album Cry Sugar by Hudson Mohawke
- A song on the album Road Games (EP), by Allan Holdsworth
- A song on the album The History of Rock, by Kid Rock
- A song on the album Unstoppable Momentum by Joe Satriani

== See also ==
- Four Sheets to the Wind, a 2007 independent film
