= Lungfish (band) =

American rock band (1988–2006)

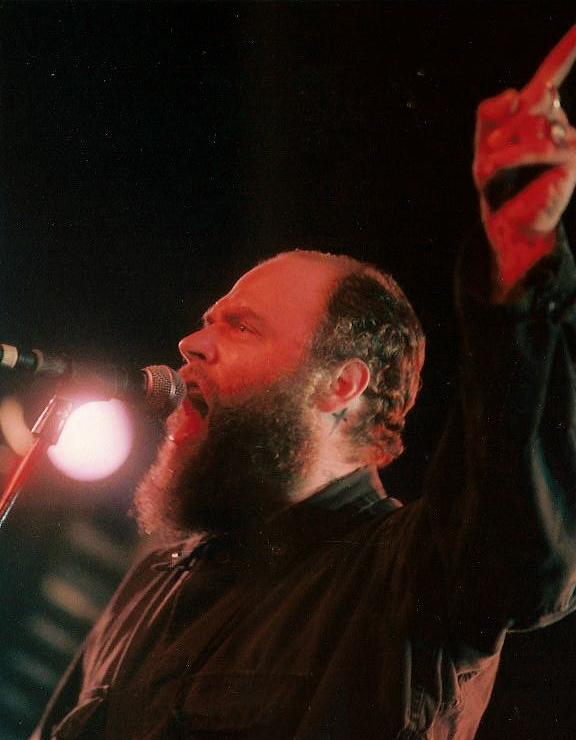
- Daniel Higgs of Lungfish in 2008

Background information
- Origin: Baltimore, Maryland, U.S.
- Genres: Post-hardcore; indie rock; post-rock; emo; psychedelia
- Years active: 1988–2006
- Labels: Dischord, Simple Machines
- Past members: Daniel Higgs; Asa Osborne; John Chriest; Nathan Bell; Mitchell Feldstein; Sean Meadows

Lungfish was an American indie rock band formed in 1987 in Baltimore, Maryland. All of their music has been released by the Washington, D.C. punk label Dischord, except for their debut album.

== History ==
As of 2005, Lungfish's lineup consisted of Daniel Higgs (vocals, occasional guitar), Asa Osborne (guitar), Sean Meadows (bass), and Mitchell Feldstein (drums). Two previous bass players were John Chriest and Nathan Bell.

== Related projects ==
Higgs sang in the 1980s hardcore/punk band Reptile House, and has released numerous solo works under his own name and also Cone of Light. He has recently made numerous solo performances, usually with the long-necked banjo and jaw harp (his recent albums document this as well: 2006's Ancestral Songs and 2007's Metempsychotic Melodies). In 2011, Higgs also collaborated with Swedish band Skull Defekts on the album Peer Amid (Thrill Jockey). Since 2015, Higgs has released two full-length albums in Fountainsun, a duo with Fumie Ishii.

Osborne has released a CD and 7-inch with Charles Brohawn of The Tinklers under the name Tear Jerks. Osborne also released an album on Dischord in 2002 with Daniel Higgs under the name The Pupils. In early 2008, the record label Holy Mountain announced a new solo project by Osborne called Zomes.

Meadows has played in numerous bands including June of 44, The Sonora Pine, and many lesser-known bands from the Chattanooga, Tennessee music scene.

Feldstein has published three volumes of prose/poetry: Hurl on Apathy Press, Teen Cardinal on Shattered Wig Press, and Even Change on Paradigm Publishing. He also played the drums with Arbouretum. In 2019 a cassette recording of Feldstein's spoken word with musical backdrops, Pretty Boss, was released on Flag Day Recordings.

Bell played bass on Kogumaza's Kолокол (2014), which featured the song "Ursids", which was used as a double-A-sided single with the band Hookworms. Bell has also worked with David Heumann from Arbouretum as Human Bell.

== Discography ==
=== Albums ===
- Necklace of Heads (1990)
- Talking Songs for Walking (1992)
- Rainbows from Atoms (1993)
- Pass and Stow (1994)
- Sound in Time (1996)
- Indivisible (1997)
- Artificial Horizon (1998)
- The Unanimous Hour (1999)
- Necrophones (2000)
- Love Is Love (2003)
- Feral Hymns (2005)
- A.C.R. 1999 (2012)

=== Singles and compilation appearances ===
- 1990: "Nothing Is Easy" on Simple Machines Records#1 "Wedge" 7-inch, re-released on The Machines: 1990-1993 comp. (Simple Machines - SMR 19, 1994)
- 1990: "Nothing Is Easy" (live version) on "Pre-Moon Syndrome Post Summer (of Noise) Celebration Week!"
- 1993: "Abraham Lincoln" on Simple Machines Working Holiday#2 "Working Holiday Series" split 7-inch (with The Tinklers)
- 1993: "Abraham Lincoln" on "The Machines Compilation CD"
- 1993: "Abraham Lincoln" on "Echoes from the Nation's Capital (A Washington D.C. Compilation) 1"
- 1994: "Abraham Lincoln" on Working Holiday! CD Compilation
- 1995: 10 East 3-song 7-inch
- 2002: "Friend to Friend in Endtime" on "Dischord 20th Anniversary Compilation"

=== Related projects: Daniel Higgs ===
- 1998: Cone of Light (as Cone of Light)
- 2002: The Pupils (as The Pupils with Asa Osborne)
- 2005: Magic Alphabet
- 2006: Plays the Mirror of the Apocalypse
- 2006: Ancestral Songs
- 2007: Atomic Yggdrasil Tarot (book & CD)
- 2007: Metempsychotic Melodies
- 2009: Devotional Songs of Daniel Higgs (cassette)
- 2009: Hymnprovisations for Banjo by the (A.I.U) with Piano & Raindrops
- 2010: Say God
- 2010: Clairaudience Fellowship (with Twig Harper)
- 2011: Peer Amid (with The Skull Defekts)
- 2011: 2013–3012 (with The Skull Defekts)
- 2011: Ultraterrestrial Harvest Hymns (cassette)
- 2011: Beyond & Between
- 2012: The Measure of Mystery (cassette)
- 2013: The Godward Way
- 2014: Dances In Dreams of ihe Known Unknown (with The Skull Defekts)
- 2014: Street Metal (with The Skull Defekts)
- 2015: VIV (LP)
- 2016: The Fools Sermon, Part 1 (LP)
- 2016: The Fools Sermon, Part 2 (Cassette)

=== Zomes (Asa Osbourne + Hanna Olivegren) ===
- 2007: Zomes
- 2011: Earth Grid
- 2013: Time Was
- 2015: Near Unison
- 2016: Who Shall Be the Sun
- 2018: The First Stone
