= The Crownhate Ruin =

American post-hardcore band

The Crownhate Ruin was an American short-lived post-hardcore band from Washington, D.C. Formed by ex-Hoover members Fred Erskine and Joe McRedmond, the band also featured Vin Novara (ex-1.6 Band) on drums.

== History ==
Hoover disbanded after a 1994 US tour. That same year the Crownhate Ruin began touring and recording what would eventually become a collection of singles, as well as a split with Boston band Karate. In 1996 they released their only full-length album, Until the Eagle Grins, on Dischord Records before splitting up later that year.

Later on, the three members would collaborate on recordings or in performances for Boom, HiM, and The Sorts. Erskine went on to join June of 44 before Hoover reunited. In 2022, the band's singles and two unreleased tracks were compiled and released.

== Discography ==
=== Albums ===
- Until the Eagle Grins (Dischord Records CD/LP, 1996)
- Singles and Early Recordings: 1994-1995 (co-release of New Atlantis and BCore Disc, LP/digital download, 2022)

=== Singles ===
- Elementary 7-inch "Lesson in Thread" b/w "Pioneers" (T.C. Ruin, 1995)
- Primer 7-inch "Present to President" and "Last Place in Triage" b/w "My Country Getaway" (T.C. Ruin, 1995)
- Visit from Mars" b/w Karate "Cherry Coke" (Art Monk Construction split 7-inch with Karate, 1995)
- Intermediate 7-inch "Better Still If They Don't Know" b/w "Every Minute's Sucker" (Dischord/T.C. Ruin, 1995)
