= Barely Real =

EP by Codeine
- Released: November 1992
- Recorded: March–July 1992
- Genre: Slowcore
- Length: 24:49
- Label: Sub Pop
- Producers: Mike McMackin, Codeine

Codeine chronology
| Frigid Stars LP (1990) | Barely Real (1992) | The White Birch (1994) |

Singles from Barely Real
- 1. "Realize" Released: July 1, 1992

Barely Real is a 1992 EP by the American indie rock band Codeine. After releasing their previous album Frigid Stars LP in 1990, the group accepted an invitation from the quartet Bastro to tour in Europe in 1991. Following the tour, the group was invited to record a single for Sub Pop Singles Club and attempted to record their follow-up album The White Birch in 1992. The recording sessions proved to be disastrous for the group since they found themselves often with unusable tracks over several different studios. As Codeine could not record enough material for a full-length album, they decided to release what tracks they had as an EP.

The music on Barely Real continued the slowcore music style of their previous album. Barely Real also featured contributions from guest musicians such as Jon Fine of Bitch Magnet playing additional guitar on the song "Jr" and a piano cover of the song "Wird" performed by David Grubbs. Following the recording sessions, the group's drummer Chris Brokaw left the group being replaced by Doug Scharin.

Barely Real had one single ("Realize") released and was initially released in Germany through Sub Pop, followed by a release in the United States in 1993. The band toured North America to promote the release which included an opening spot for Mazzy Star and their first shows in Canada. The album received praise from the Alternative Press and Melody Maker on its initial release, with the latter calling the work "25 minutes of snowblind glory". The EP was reissued by The Numero Group in 2012, including various unreleased songs and new material. The reissue was acclaimed Spin and Pitchfork, with the latter describing the release as "masterful".

== Background and production ==
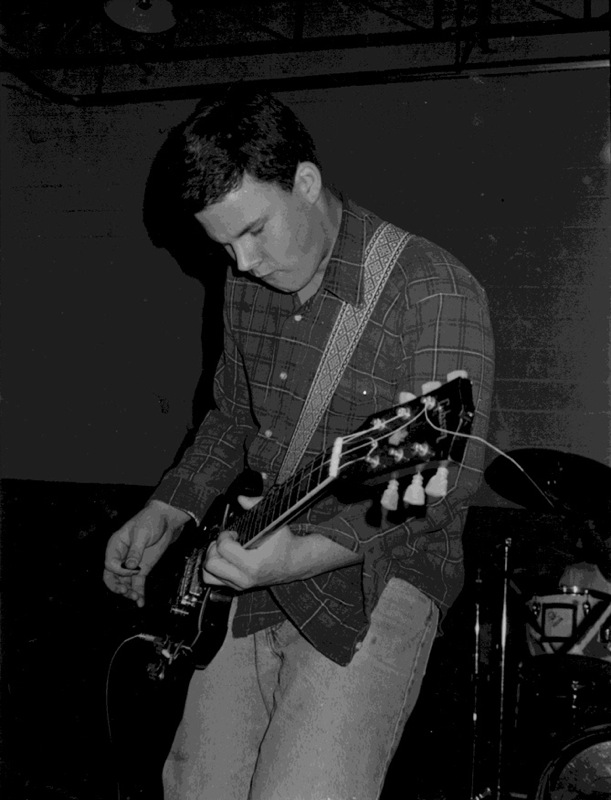
David Grubbs contributed to the album through the song "W.", a piano version of the unused song "Wird".

Following the well received release of Frigid Stars LP (1990), Codeine accepted an invitation from David Grubbs and John McEntire to open for their group Bastro on their European tour in 1991. To prepare for the tour, Codeine and Bastro met in a studio to record the song "Produkt" and "A l'Ombre de Nous" as a seven-inch single for the label Glitterhouse. Following the tour, Immerwahr returned to New York working as an engineer at Mike McMackin's Sound on Sound studio. John Engle worked as a delivery man for a restaurant and Chris Brokaw waited tables and wrote songs with Thalia Zedek that would later be released on Eleven:Eleven, the debut album for Come.

"1992 was a very hard year for Codeine. Unlike the two Frigid Stars sessions, all our recordings went terribly"

— Stephen Immerwahr on the failed recording sessions of The White Birch which became Barely Real.

Towards the end of 1991, Sub Pop gave the group $1000 to record the July 1992 entry in the labels singles club series. The group entered James Kavoussi's Toxic Shock Studios on Broadway in New York with Frigid Stars LP producer Mike McMackin to record early versions of "Realize", "Jr", and a cover of the MX-80 song "Promise of Love". The tracks were not successful with only "Promise of Love" being usable. Engle noted that Codeine desired the song to be loud on both sides of the single, but could not get the song "Jr" to come together. The group had already gone through most of their budget for recording, which led to them going to an eight-track studio in the Boston suburb of Allston. Immerwahr went into the studio where the group were able to complete a version of the song "Realize". The group met up again to work in early 1992 towards their second LP The White Birch, with recording commencing in June at Harold Dessau Recording at 25 Murray Street in Manhattan. At the studio, the group attempted to record versions of "Realize", "Jr", "Tom", "Wird" "Smoking Room", "Barely Real", "Something New" and "Sea" within a month's time. Immerwahr was not content with the tracks, noting several issues such as his own vocals, his desire to record music with even slower tempos, and the presence of high pitched noises in the songs that no one else could hear. On attempting to fix a broken toilet at the studio, Immerwahr accidentally flooded the clothing store below the studio.

Codeine decided to continue their recording sessions in July at the studio in Boston where "Barely Real" and their third recording of "Jr" were completed. The band then continued to Night Owl studio to record "Hard To Find" with a drum machine. Jon Fine of the band Bitch Magnet added guitar to "Jr" while Mike McMackin began to EQ the tracks from Toxic Shock, Night Owl, and the Boston studio. Immerwahr also contributed to the mixing of the album without McMackin, stating that they were not getting along after their extended periods of time spent recording. The band quickly noticed that the amount of material they had recorded would not be enough for the length of an LP which lead the group to releasing what they had as an EP. To balance out the EP's sides, the band revisited the instrumental song "Wird" that was made as a tribute to the band Slint. Immerwahr described "Wird" as a song he regretted making, as it was an attempt to do a version of a song from Slint's album Tweez. He sent a tape of the track to David Grubbs to do a piano version of the song that was re-titled "W.". John McEntire recorded the song in a music room at the University of Chicago where he was working on an undergraduate degree.

After completing the album, Brokaw left Codeine to focus on his band Come. The group shot the video for "Realize" without him. Engle took longer than he expected to replace Brokaw as after placing a classified ad, he ended up "flooded with calls" and that "Half of them hadn't heard Codeine. I'd say, well, we play a very particular style that you should really know about." The group chose Doug Scharin, who had attended Codeine's first show in Boston.

== Music ==
Stephen Immerwahr, who wrote the lyrics to the original songs on Barely Real described composing these lyrics as "probably the hardest work. Not that we have these prodigious texts, but there's a consistency between the lyrical subject and content and the presentation of the music". Immerwhar described his lyrics as expressing feelings of alienation and banality. When he was asked regarding the lyrics on Barely Real and The White Birch, Immerwahr said he preferred the lyrics on latter album where he desired to "have more writerly songs", where he found "out that there were different sources of the same feelings that seemed to inspire earlier Codeine songs."

The Toronto Star described the Codeine's music as slowcore, a style AllMusic stated was famous for having a slow pace and skeletal music with "melodies linger forever and rhythms lurch forward, all shrouded in thick, dank atmospherics." Stewart Mason of AllMusic described the music of Barely Real as a continuation of the style made on their previous album", while comparing a review of the compilation album When I See The Sun in Exclaim! proposed that the group's music "didn't change much during their five years together ― all the songs are relentlessly slow and possess an emotional detachment verging on apathy." When asked about the music's pace, on Barely Real, Immerwahr said the music was in contrast to grunge music of the era, and that slowing it down made it "challenging for people and challenging for audiences. And I actually kind of like that." In a contemporary review, Ned Raggett of AllMusic stated this style is exemplified on songs like "Realize", which continued the hybrid of a deliberate pace with electric guitar playing with softly sung vocals. Some tracks contained a variation on Codeine's music, such as "Promise of Love", which Raggett characterized as having a "late-night jazz club style" that only contains more traditional Codeine styled music towards the end. Other songs that veried the sound included the piano-based track "W." performed by David Grubbs and quick stuttering guitar riff on "Jr". Immerwahr spoke about the tracks "W." and "Promise of Love", opining that "W." created a "nice transition from the severity of 'Hard to Find' to the jazzy 'Promise of Love'"

== Release and tour ==
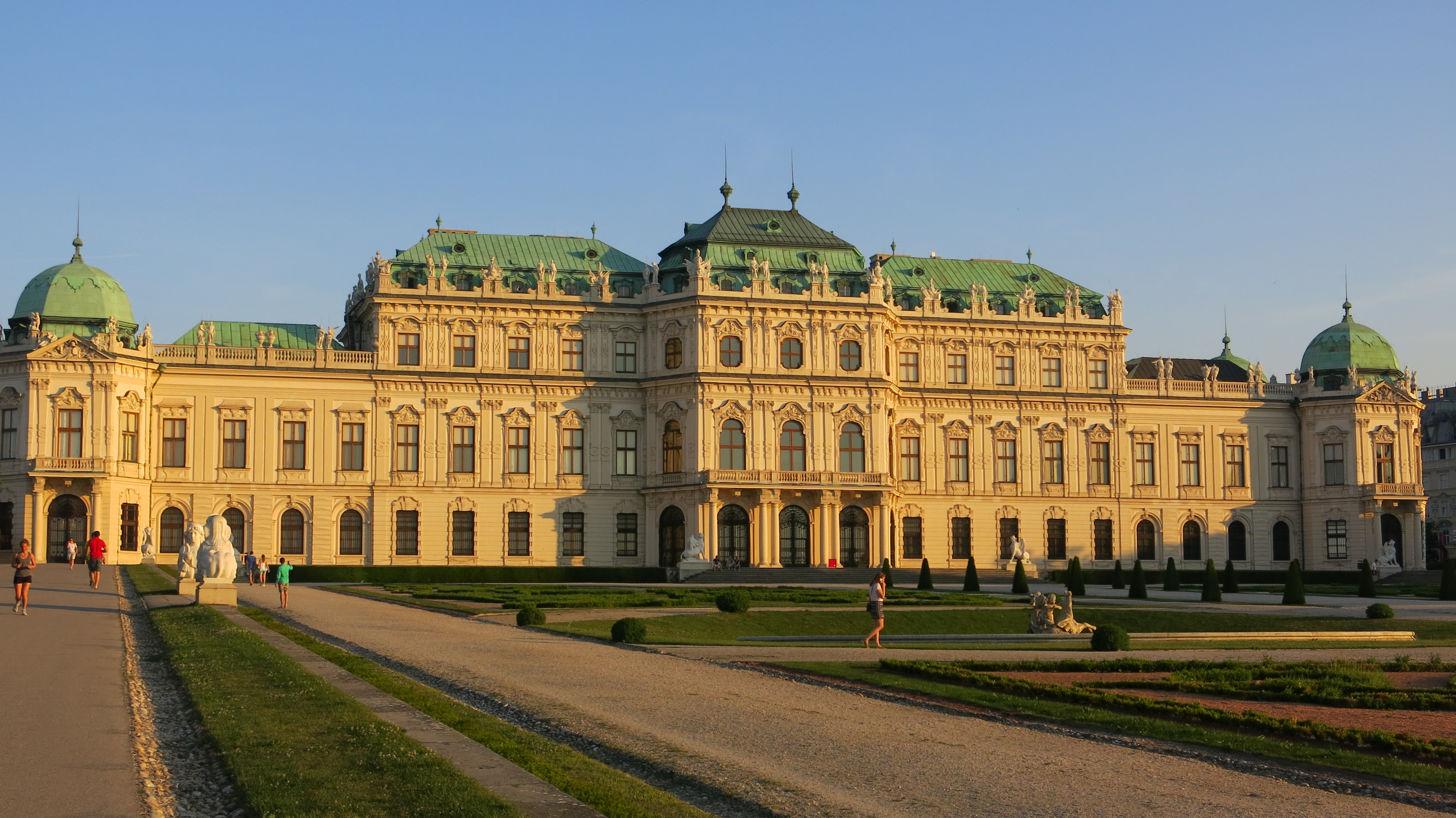
The cover of Barely Real features a postcard of Belvedere Palace in Vienna.

Prior to the release of the EP, a single for "Realize" was released on July 1, 1992. It was released on as a seven-inch single on clear and white vinyl limited to 2,933 copies. Barely Real was released by Sub Pop in Germany in November 1992. The cover of the album is taken from a postcard of Belvedere Palace Stephen Immerwahr had found on their 1991 tour of Europe. Immerwahr felt that the image reminded him of the film Last Year at Marienbad, which he described as a film that was "all stylish surface to the point where time itself seems suspended, and without the possibility of human emotional connection." Immerwahr related the image with his own lyrical themes of what he described as "an impossible need to connect with others." Codeine and the band Love Child did a five-week European tour in late 1992 after the release of the EP. When the tour went through Vienna in 1992, the group stopped to visit the palace. During the tour, Codeine would occasionally encore with the song "Broken Hearted Wine", a B-side on the single for "Barely Real".

The album received a released in the United States through Sub Pop on July 1, 1993. In 1993, Codeine opened for Mazzy Star on selected dates in the Midwest and toured through North America. This tour had Codeine perform their first shows in Canada. Stephen Immerwahr spoke about the audiences to the Toronto Star, noting that they were people "who sit and really listen to stuff...Not people drinking themselves into oblivion." Reviewing one of their 1993 shows, Mark Jenkins of The Washington Post stating that Codeine "pursues the intoxicating dislocation offered by slow-mo cinematography" and that the drumming of Doug Scharin "rattled rib cages throughout the club". The review concluded that despite the self-imposed limitations that Codeine's music had, the result was a "curiously effective marriage of meditation and aggression."

The Numero Group re-released Barely Real with nine bonus tracks on both compact disc and vinyl in 2012. This release added unreleased songs, Peel sessions, demo tracks, and the songs "Cracked in Two", "Broken-Hearted Wine", and a live cover of Unrest's "Hydroplane". On the reissue, Brokaw commented that "we were all happy with the [Barely Real]. Some of the Dessau sessions are being included in the reissues on Numero, which I'm very glad about. The best way I can describe it is that we had high aspirations around what we wanted to achieve and it wasn't always easy (or even possible) to make those happen."

== Reception ==
Professional ratings
Review scores
| Source | Rating |
|---|---|
| AllMusic | 4.5/5 stars |
| Pitchfork | 8.6/10 |
| Spin | 7/10 |

In contemporary reviews, Peter Paphides wrote in Melody Maker that the EP was "25 minutes of snowblind glory waiting here if you want them. Each of them is a towering monument to nothingness". The Alternative Press opined that the EP was not "a progression from the gorgeously devastated Frigid Stars and I couldn't be happier. Codeine have hit upon a formula so pure and righteous it would be tragic for them to deviate from it." The Washington Post gave the album a mixed review, explaining that "There's not a lot going on here, but songs such as "Realize" and "Hard to Find" are hardly nothing." and that tracks such as "W." allow Codeine to achieve "both earthly aggression and unearthly calm." Charles Aaron of Spin, reviewed the single "Realize", stating that the song "inches along as if Codeine's still wondering whether it's worth the effort". The b-side "Broken-hearted Wine" was described as a song that "coolly walks a delicate line between delibitating sadness and cartoon regret."

From retrospective reviews, The Virgin Encyclopedia of Nineties Music commented that Barely Real was "on first hearing, slightly soporific and listless, but it rewards repeated listening with its depth and emotional texture." Ned Raggett (AllMusic) gave the album a rating of four and a half stars out of five, explaining that "Those put off by earlier Codeine CDs won't want to continue; those taken by the band's way of doing things will happily embrace it." The Numero Group's reissue received positive reviews from Spin and Pitchfork, with Pitchfork declaring that after The Frigid Stars LP, the EP "felt masterful in its compression of what we'd come to expect from them."

== Track listing ==
Original Sub Pop release

All lyrics are written by Stephen Immerwahr, except where noted

| No. | Title | Writer(s) | Arrangements | Length |
|---|---|---|---|---|
| 1. | "Realize" | | | 5:04 |
| 2. | "Jr" | | | 3:08 |
| 3. | "Barely Real" | | | 3:13 |
| 4. | "Hard to Find" | | | 3:18 |
| 5. | "W." | | David Grubbs | 4:53 |
| 6. | "Promise of Love" | Bruce Anderson, Andrea Ross | | 5:13 |
| Total length: | | | | 24:49 |

Numero group re-release

All lyrics are written by Stephen Immerwahr, except where noted

Side A
| No. | Title | Length |
|---|---|---|
| 1. | "Realize" | 5:04 |
| 2. | "Jr" | 3:08 |
| 3. | "Barely Real" | 3:13 |

Side B
| No. | Title | Writer(s) | Arrangements | Length |
|---|---|---|---|---|
| 4. | "Hard to Find" | | | 3:18 |
| 5. | "W." | | David Grubbs | 4:53 |
| 6. | "Promise of Love" | Bruce Anderson, Andrea Ross | | 5:13 |

Side C
| No. | Title | Length |
|---|---|---|
| 1. | "Jr" (Demo) | 3:23 |
| 2. | "Tom" (Demo) | 4:17 |
| 3. | "Wird" (Demo) | 5:24 |
| 4. | "I Wonder" (Demo) | 4:38 |

Side D
| No. | Title | Writer(s) | Length |
|---|---|---|---|
| 1. | "Hydroplane" (Live) | Bridget Cross, Phil Krauth, Mark Robinson | 5:52 |
| 2. | "A l'ombre de Nous" | Pierre Barouh, Francis Lai | 4:27 |
| 3. | "Cracked in Two" | | 2:52 |
| 4. | "Realize" (Demo) | | 5:14 |
| 5. | "Broken-Hearted Wine" | | 3:52 |

== Personnel ==
Credits adapted from Barely Real initial releases liner notes and Numero Group's 2012 reissue.

Original Sub Pop release

- Codeine – recording engineer, producer
- Mike McMacklin – recording engineer, producer
- Chris Brokaw – drums (on "Realize", "Jr", "Barely Real" and "Promise of Love"), guitar (on "Realize", "Barely Real")
- John Engle – guitar
- Stephen Immerwahr – bass, vocals, piano (on "Hard To Find")
- Jon Fine – guitar (on "Jr")
- David Grubbs – piano (on "W.")

Numero group rerelease

- Mike McMackin – recording engineer, producer, engineer
- Chris Brokaw – drums (on "Jr (Demo)", "Tom (Demo)", "Wird (Demo)", "Realize (Demo)"), guitar (on "Jr (Demo)", "Tom (Demo)", "Wird (Demo)", "Hydroplane (Live)", "Realize (Demo)", "Broken-Hearted Wine"), vocals (on "Broken-Hearted Wine")
- John Engle – guitar (on "Jr (Demo)", "Tom (Demo)", "Wird (Demo)", ), guitar (on "Jr (Demo)", "Tom (Demo)", "Wird (Demo), "Hydroplane (Live)", "Broken-Hearted Wine"), piano (on "A L'ombre de Nous"), vocals (on "Broken-Hearted Wine")
- Stephen Immerwahr – bass (on "Jr (Demo)", "Tom (Demo)", "Wird (Demo)", ), guitar (on "Jr (Demo)", "Tom (Demo)", "Wird (Demo)", "Hydroplane (Live)", "Realize (Demo)"), vocals, guitar (on "I Wonder (Demo)"), various instruments (on "Cracked in Two")
- John McEntire – drums (on "A L'ombre de Nous")
- David Grubbs – organ, vocals (on "A L'ombre de Nous")
- Lexi Mitchell – booklet cover photography
- Ken Brown – photography
- Mike Galinsky – photography
- Charles Peterson – photography
- Manfred Rahs – photography
- Moni Kellermann – photography
- Rob Sevier – reisusse producer
- Ken Shipley – reissue producer, research, compiler
- Jeff Lipton – mastering
- Henry H. Owings – art direction
- The Numero Group – package design

== See also ==
- 1992 in music
- Music of New York City
