= Stephen Immerwahr =

American bass guitarist and vocalist

- Genre: Slowcore
- Occupation: Musician
- Instruments: Bass guitar, vocals
- Years active: 1988–present

Stephen Immerwahr is an American bass guitarist and vocalist best known as a founding member of the slowcore group Codeine.

== Biography ==
Stephen Immerwahr began his foray into music in 1988, originally serving as an assistant engineer to bands such as Soul Asylum and Living Colour. In 1989, Immerwahr formed Codeine with drummer Chris Brokaw and guitarist John Engle. Codeine pioneered the slowcore and sadcore subgenres of indie rock, but with a more experimental attitude than other bands in the genre, such as Low, Idaho and Red House Painters. Codeine released their first album Frigid Stars LP on the German label Glitterhouse in August 1990. Codeine's final release was the full-length album The White Birch, released in May 1994. Following his work in Codeine, Immerwahr would later exit a career in music to become a research scientist

In February 2012, Codeine announced they would perform on the request of Mogwai at All Tomorrow's Parties sister event, I'll Be Your Mirror, on 26 May 2012 at Alexandra Palace, along with other shows, to commemorate a comprehensive reissue of their recordings by The Numero Group in June 2012. Since 2023, following Numero's release of Dessau (abandoned recordings from 1992), Codeine has reunited for tours in Europe, United States, Mexico, South America, and Japan.
