= Soccer Team =

American band

- Origin: Washington, D.C., U.S.
- Genres: Rock
- Years active: 2006–present
- Label: Dischord
- Members: Ryan Nelson; Melissa Quinley; Dennis Kane; Jason Hutto

Soccer Team is an American rock band from Washington, D.C., featuring Ryan Nelson (The Most Secret Method, Beauty Pill) and Melissa Quinley.

== History ==
Ryan Nelson and Melissa Quinley met as co-workers at Dischord Records and began writing songs together in Nelson's house. Slowly a collection of fourteen tracks was amassed that the duo released on Dischord as "Volunteered" Civility & Professionalism in 2006. Nelson then relocated to Flint, Michigan to attend school and the project was put on hiatus.

When Nelson returned to Washington D.C. in 2012, the two reunited and added keyboardist/guitarist Jason Hutto (The Aquarium, Warm Sun) and Quinley's husband, drummer Dennis Kane. This lineup released the band's second album, Real Lessons In Cynicism, in 2015.

== Discography ==
- "Volunteered” Civility and Professionalism (2006, Dischord Records)
- Real Lessons In Cynicism (2015, Dischord Records)
