= Rusty (Rodan album) =

Studio album by Rodan
- Released: April 4, 1994
- Recorded: September 25, 1993, to October 22, 1993, in Chicago and Louisville
- Genre: Indie rock; post-rock
- Length: 42:21
- Label: Quarterstick
- Producer: Jake Loewenstein; Rodan

Rodan chronology
Rusty (1994)	Fifteen Quiet Years (2013)

Rusty is the first and only full-length studio album by American band Rodan. It was released on April 4, 1994, on Quarterstick Records. The album takes its name from its engineer, Bob "Rusty" Weston. The album consists of re-recordings of 6 songs from the band's demo Aviary. The album has a cult following and is regarded as influential in the indie rock and post-rock genres.

== Background ==
Rodan formed in 1992 and would release a demo shortly thereafter called the Aviary demo, including two songs that would later be released as another demo, How the Winter Passed. 6 of the songs on the Aviary demo would later be re-recorded and turned into the band's debut album, Rusty.

== Music ==
Rusty contains elements of art punk and rockabilly. Ned Raggett of AllMusic said that Rodan were a band "with clear roots but also one with a sense of its own strong fusion." Some of the tracks utilize audio feedback, and some of the riffs have drawn comparisons to Funkadelic and Fugazi. Music journalist Andrew Earles said: "Rusty marks its own genesis of noisy indie rock and the specific strain of noise rock/post-hardcore that followed in its wake. Sorry, calling it math rock would be using the album's most popular descriptor, but it would also sell short the album and the band that made it."

== Critical reception ==
Professional ratings
Review scores
Source	Rating
AllMusic	4/5 stars
NME	7/10

Rusty received critical acclaim and has since been cited as an influential album on the post-rock and post-hardcore scenes of the 1990s, often compared favorably to Slint's 1991 album Spiderland. Rolling Stone wrote that the band creates "ambient, atmospheric guitar noise that suddenly gives way to a racket that sounds vaguely similar to a construction site."

AllMusic writer Ned Raggett said, "this is an album to readily get lost in. The evident variety is another reason to listen, not least because everything is handled so aptly, parts of a greater overall whole."

=== Accolades ===
Critical rankings for Rusty
Publication	Type	List	Year	Rank	Ref.
Fact	All-time	The 30 best post-rock albums of all time	2016	5	
Consequence	All-time	10 Best Post-Rock Albums That Just Might Ruin a Party	2023	9	
Treble	All-time	The 50 Best Post-Rock Albums	2024	31	

== Track listing ==
All tracks are written by Rodan.

No.	Title	Length
1.	"Bible Silver Corner"	6:52
2.	"Shiner"	2:38
3.	"The Everyday World of Bodies"	11:55
4.	"Jungle Jim"	7:31
5.	"Gauge"	7:17
6.	"Tooth Fairy Retribution Manifesto"	6:28

== Personnel ==
Rodan

- Kevin Coultas – drums, vocals, guitar (1)
- Jeff Mueller – guitar, vocals
- Jason B. Noble – guitar, vocals, piano (1)
- Tara Jane O'Neil – bass guitar, vocals

Additional musicians

- Nat Barrett – cello (1)
- Eve Miller – cello (1)
- Christian Frederickson – viola (1)
- Michael Kurth – bass guitar (1)

Technical personnel

- Steve Good – engineering
- Jason Loewenstein – production
- Brian McMahan – engineering
- Bob Weston – engineering
