= The Most Secret Method =

- Ryan Nelson (left) and Marc Nelson (right) during a live performance.

Background information
- Origin: Washington, D.C., United States
- Genres: Hardcore punk; alternative rock
- Years active: 1995–2002
- Labels: Superbad; Dischord; Slowdime
- Past members: Johanna Claasen; Marc Nelson; Ryan Nelson

The Most Secret Method was an American post-hardcore band formed in Washington, D.C., in 1995. Combining styles from groups of the first wave of punk with newer indie rock influences, the band was a major part of the vanguard which represented the D.C. music scene's new direction in the aftermath of the Revolution Summer movement. In addition to their music, the Most Secret Method developed a signature visual art style on their concert posters and 1998 album, Get Lovely, thanks to drums player Ryan Nelson.

== History ==
Founded in 1995, the Most Secret Method featured the trio of Johanna Claasen (bass guitar, vocals), and brothers Marc Nelson (lead guitar, vocals) and Ryan Nelson (drums). The band's name was taken from a line from the book Charlie and the Chocolate Factory by Roald Dahl.

The band made its debut at the high-profile independent music nightclub the Black Cat alongside fellow D.C. band the Capitol City Dusters. Live performances in the D.C. punk scene's abundance of venues and widely observed all-ages policy helped the group hone their heavily emphasized rhythm technique, while attracting a sizable following in a brief amount of time. Additionally, the Most Secret Method incorporated stylistic tendencies from like-minded groups of the D.C. punk community such as Juno, the Dismemberment Plan, Smart Went Crazy, and Jawbox. Ryan Nelson thought "to a large extent the D.C. musicians of the ‘90s were influenced by the Revolution Summer bands. I certainly was. And by the time we got around to forming our own bands, there was still an active underground community – a network of places to play and kids to stay with around the country".

In 1997, the Most Secret Method split an EP with the Capitol City Dusters on Superbad Records, a subsidiary of Dischord Records. In addition to the band's musical aesthetic, much was made of Ryan Nelson's visual art designs on the Most Secret Method's concert fliers. Well aware of the designs of artists including Raymond Pettibon (designer of Black Flag album covers and the Sonic Youth's Goo artwork), Love and Rockets creator Jaime Hernandez, and Ghost World writer and artist Daniel Clowes, Nelson's artwork for the band became immediately recognizable and considered among the best the area produced. Combine with the group's split EP, Nelson's artistic style was instrumental in landing their record deal with Slowdime Records in 1998.

Jawbox's guitarist J. Robbins collaborated with the Most Secret Method to record and mix their debut album, titled Get Lovely, at Arlington's Inner Ear Studios. Music historian Brandon Gentrey described the album as a "sterling example of Capitol City post-hardcore indie ruckus, buzzing, dynamic, and smart", while managing to stand the test of time. Released in September 1998, Get Lovely features cover art and inner sleeve designs by Nelson, who was inspired to create a piece which rivaled the boldness of Big Black's Songs About Fucking. The album had a profound influence on the following generation of punk bands, with groups such as Q and Not U and Black Eyes exhibiting signs of the Most Secret Method's style.

Following the distribution of Get Lovely, the group had a down period in which the band members took to other activities. Ryan Nelson played in the bands the Dead Teenagers and Beauty Pill, Marc Nelson devoted time to acting, and Claasen focused on practicing standup bass, before resurfacing in 2002 to release their second album Our Success. In August 2002, the Most Secret Method returned for a series of concerts at the Black Cat before disbanding. Nelson continued his music career, forming the band the Soccer Team, which has released two albums for Dischord Records. Marc Nelson began acting full time under the stage name Marcus Kyd. He went on to found Taffety Punk Theatre Company in Washington, DC, with choreographer Erin F. Mitchell, actors Lise Bruneau and Chris Marino, and manager Amanda MacKaye.

== Discography ==
=== Single and EP ===
- "Blue" b/w "Perfect Plan" – (self-released), 1996
- The Most Secret Method / The Dusters Split – Dischord Records (#DIS-117.5), 1997

=== Albums ===
- Get Lovely – Slowdime Records (#15), 1998
- Our Success – Superbad Records (#9), 2002
