= The Sonora Pine =

Mid-1990s American indie rock band

- Origin: New York City, New York, United States
- Genres: Indie rock; post-rock; slowcore
- Years active: 1995–1997
- Label: Quarterstick
- Spinoff of: Rodan
- Past members: Tara Jane O'Neil; Sean Meadows; Samara Lubelski; Kevin Coultas

The Sonora Pine was an American indie rock band founded by Tara Jane O'Neil active from 1995 to 1997.

== History ==
O'Neil formed the band after the breakup of Rodan in 1995, in which she played bass. After moving to New York City, she began working with guitarist Sean Meadows, formerly of Lungfish, and added violinist Samara Lubelski for local shows. They then moved back to Louisville, Kentucky, where Rodan had been based, and added Rodan's drummer, Kevin Coultas, for the recording of their debut album. Pianist Rachel Grimes, of the group Rachel's, made an appearance on this album, which was released by Quarterstick Records in 1996.

Meadows left the group in 1997, and the group worked as a trio for their sophomore effort, also released on Quarterstick. The group disbanded after the release of the album.

== Band members ==
- Tara Jane O'Neil – guitar, bass, organ, vocals
- Sean Meadows – guitar, organ, vocals
- Samara Lubelski – violin
- Kevin Coultas – drums, percussion

== Discography ==
=== Studio albums ===
- The Sonora Pine (Quarterstick, 1996)
- The Sonora Pine II (Quarterstick, 1997)
