= The Machines: 1990–1993 =

Compilation album by Various Artists
- Released: 1994
- Genre: Alternative rock, indie rock, post-hardcore, emo, math rock
- Label: Simple Machines

The Machines: 1990–1993 also known as Simple Machines: 1990–1993 is a compilation album created by Simple Machines records. The compilation consisted of six of the earliest EPs; Wedge (SMR 01; 1990), Wheel (SMR 02; 1990), Pulley (SMR 03; 1991), Screw (SMR 04; 1991), Lever (SMR 05; 1992), and Inclined Plane (SMR 06; 1993). None of the songs are necessarily listed in the same orders as they are on their respected EPs.

The album contains The Hated's cover of the Simon and Garfunkel hit "I Am a Rock", rare songs by Velocity Girl and Superchunk, as well as two rants by Juliana Luecking, one of which is spoken in a fake Baltimore accent. It also contains two songs by Geek called "Herasure" and "Hemingway Shotgun", the latter of which Allmusic has mistakenly referred to as "Hemingway Station".

== Track listing ==
1. The Hated - "I Am a Rock"
2. Lungfish - "Nothing Is Easy"
3. Edsel - "Feeder"
4. Geek - "Herasure"
5. Juliana(Luecking) - "So Fuckin' Perfec'"
6. Holy Rollers - "Swallowing My Swallow"
7. Juliana(Luecking) - "The Chase"
8. Holy Rollers - "Moments Before Impact"
9. Bricks - "Spy Kitty"
10. My New Boyfriend - "Thurston Dance"
11. Nation of Ulysses - "Diphtheria"
12. Mommyheads - "At the Mall"
13. Candy Machine - "My Old Man"
14. Jawbox - "Footbinder"
15. Geek - "Hemingway Shotgun"
16. Velocity Girl - "What You Say"
17. Severin - "Me & You"
18. Scrawl - "Reuters"
19. Autoclave - "Summer"
20. Circus Lupus - "Pacifier"
21. Tsunami - "Beauty, Part II"
22. Superchunk - "Baxter"
23. Rodan - "Darjeering"
24. Unrest - "Winona Ryder"
