= Rodan (band) =

1990s American post-hardcore band

- Origin: Louisville, Kentucky, U.S.
- Genres: Post-hardcore; math rock; indie rock; post-rock
- Years active: 1992–1995
- Label: Quarterstick
- Spinoffs: June of 44; Shipping News; The Sonora Pine
- Past members: Jeff Mueller; Jason Noble; Tara Jane O'Neil; Kevin Coultas; Jon Cook; John Weiss

Rodan was an American post-hardcore band from Louisville, Kentucky. The best known lineup of the band consisted of Jeff Mueller (guitar/vocals), Jason Noble (guitar/vocals), Tara Jane O'Neil (bass/vocals), and Kevin Coultas (drums). The group was a prominent member of the Louisville indie scene, along with bands such as Squirrel Bait.

In addition to various demos and compilation appearances, they released their only studio album, Rusty, in 1994. It would later be regarded as an early classic of the post-rock genre, and has often been compared to fellow Louisville group Slint. The group would break up shortly after its release, but a cult following would still form for the band.

== History ==
=== 1992–1993: Formation, Aviary, early demos ===
Rodan formed in Louisville, Kentucky, in 1992 by Jason Noble and Jeff Mueller, who had met in high school and art school. After quickly passing through drummers Jon Cook and John Weiss, the band's roster was solidified by the addition of Kevin Coultas in 1993. In 1993, they recorded their Aviary demo, which saw limited release. Later that year, two songs from Aviary, "Milk and Melancholy" and "Exoskeleton", were rerecorded and released as How the Winter Was Passed.

The band would additionally appear on the Simple Machines Records compilation The Machines: 1990-1993. They would contribute the song "Darjeeling' and would appear with various other prominent indie and post-hardcore bands such as Jawbox and Superchunk. The band was close to the label although they never signed, contributing to several compilations and playing at the label's Working Holiday festival.

=== 1994: Rusty and Half-Cocked ===
Six of the songs on the Aviary demo were re-recorded by Bob "Rusty" Weston (of Shellac fame), and released in 1994 as the album Rusty. The band starred in the 1994 cult road movie Half-Cocked; they also contributed music to the film's soundtrack. The band also had a Peel session in 1995. These releases and sessions would help to foster a cult following for the band.

=== 1995–present: Disbandment and post-Rodan projects ===
Rodan broke up in 1995, with the members pursuing other musical interests.

Mueller co-founded the band June of 44 in 1994. O'Neil played in the bands The King Cobra, The Naysayer, and Retsin. Noble played in the chamber music group Rachel's which also featured contributions from Coultas and Mueller.

Mueller and Noble also co-founded the band Shipping News in 1996 which was active until Noble's death in 2012. Noble was also part of the band Per Mission.

In 1996, O'Neil recruited Coultas to work with her on The Sonora Pine which disbanded the next year after releasing two albums.

Weiss was part of the band Sunspring and Cook was active in the bands Crain and Cerebellum.

In Fearless, Jeanette Leech's book on the history of the post-rock genre, Rodan is discussed in the chapter on the Louisville scene.

On August 4, 2012, Jason Noble died from synovial sarcoma. Original drummer Jon Cook died on February 9, 2013. Before he died, Noble would help create a final compilation of the band's music, Fifteen Quiet Years, released on June 11, 2023.

== Musical style ==
Rodan has been classified as a Post-hardcore, Post-rock, and Indie rock band. They emerged from the Louisville, Kentucky scene which would produce bands such as Squirrel Bait, Slint, and My Morning Jacket. Ned Raggett of AllMusic said that Rodan were a band "with clear roots but also one with a sense of its own strong fusion."

== Band members ==
=== Core members ===
- Tara Jane O'Neil – bass guitar, vocals (1992–1995)
- Jeff Mueller – guitar, vocals (1992–1995)
- Jason Noble – guitar, vocals (1992–1995; died 2012)
- Kevin Coultas – drums, vocals (1993–1995)

=== Other members ===
- Jon Cook – drums (1992; died 2013)
- John Weiss – drums (1992)

== Discography ==
Studio albums

- Rusty (1994)

Demos

- Aviary (1993; self-released cassette demo)

EPs

- How the Winter Was Passed EP (Three Little Girls Recordings, 1993)

Compilations

- Fifteen Quiet Years (Quarterstick Records, 2013)
- Hat Factory '93 (Quarterstick Records, 2019; LP/digital download)

Compilation appearances

- Neither a Borrower Nor a Lender Bee (Bees Make Honey, year unknown) (song: "Tongue-Tied")
- The Aftereffects of Insomnia, Vol. 2 (Three Little Girls Recordings, 1992) (song: "Shiner" [Demo])
- Slamdek Merry Christmas Is for Rockers (Slamdek Records, 1992) (song: "Toothfairy Retribution Manifesto")
- The Machines 1990-1993 (Simple Machines Records, 1993) (song: "Darjeeling")
- Omphalos (Richie's Lemon-Herb Media, 1993) (song: "Tooth Fairy Retribution Manifesto")
- Inclined Plane (Simple Machines, 1993) (song: "Darjeeling")
- Working Holiday (Simple Machines, 1994) (song: "Big Things, Little Things")
- The Monsters of Rock II (Simple Machines, 1994) (song: "Tooth Fairy Retribution Manifesto" [Live])
- CMJ New Music No. 10 (College Music Journal, May 1994) (song: "Tooth Fairy Retribution Manifesto")
- Louisville Babylon (Analog Distillery, 1994) (song: "Who Killed Marilyn")
- Compulsiv for Two 7" (Compulsiv Music 1994) (song: "Shiner")
- Half-Cocked (Matador, 1995) (song: "Tron")
- Slamdek A to Z. The Illustrated History of Louisville's Slamdek Record Company 1986-1995 (K Composite Media & Initial Records, 1996) (song: "Toothfairy Retribution Manifesto")
- Louisville Babylon 1994/2007 (Double Malt Music, 2007) (song: "Who Killed Marilyn?")
