= Kerosene 454 =

American post-hardcore band

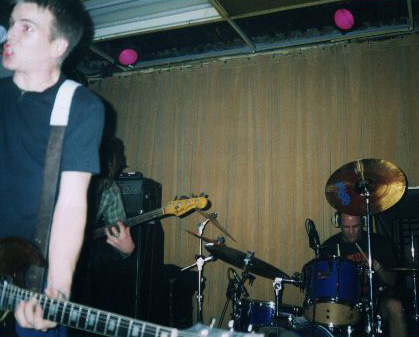
- Kerosene 454 in 1998

Background information
- Also known as: K454
- Origin: Washington, D.C., U.S.
- Genres: Post-hardcore; emo; indie rock; punk rock; post-rock
- Years active: 1992–1998
- Labels: Art Monk Construction; Slowdime Records; Polyvinyl Records
- Past members: Erik Denno; Jim Wall; John Wall; Darren Zentek; Geoff Williams; Eric Rogan; Bobby Tamkin
- Website: kerosene454.bandcamp.com

Kerosene 454 was an American post-hardcore band from Washington, D.C., formed in 1992 and active until 1998.

== History ==
The band formed in 1992. Throughout their early years, the group would release several 7"s, including split albums with Angel Hair and Bluetip, and also embark on extensive tours throughout Europe and Japan. The core members of Kerosene 454, brothers John and Jim Wall along with Erik Denno, went through a number of drummers before joining up with Darren Zentek in time to record their debut studio album, Situation At Hand, in 1995. This lineup continued to tour and record for 5 years, releasing the albums Came By To Kill Me in 1996, and At Zero in 1998, both of which released on the Slowdime Records label (in conjunction with Dischord Records), which John Wall co-ran. The band broke up in 1998, following a tour in support of At Zero.

After the band's dissolution, Denno and Zentek joined the D.C.-based band Oswego in 1999, with brothers Jim and John going on to form Vito Bruno with Brandon Butler (of Boys Life) and Vin Novara (of The Crownhate Ruin).

== Band members ==
=== Final lineup ===
- Erik Denno - guitar, vocals (1993-1998)
- Jim Wall - guitar, vocals (1993-1998)
- John Wall - bass (1993-1998)
- Darren Zentek - drums (1995-1998)

=== Former members ===
- Geoff Williams - drums (1992-1994)
- Bobby Tamkin - drums (1994-1995)
- Eric Rogan - drums (1995-1995)

== Discography ==
=== Studio albums ===
- Situation at Hand (Art Monk Construction, 1995)
- Came By To Kill Me (Slowdime/Dischord, 1996)
- At Zero (Slowdime/Dischord, 1998)

=== Extended plays ===
- Two For Flinching (Art Monk Construction, 1993)
- Blown Clean (Fire Power Products, 1994)
- Down in Three (Strict, 1993)

=== Split albums ===
- Kerosene 454 / Angel Hair (Strict, 1995)
- Kerosene 454 / Bluetip (Maggadee, 1996)

=== Compilation albums ===
- Race (Polyvinyl, 1997)
- Touring Japan = 日本 旅行 (Time Bomb, 1998) - split compilation with Naht, Sweetbelly Freakdown and Bluetip

=== Compilation appearances ===
- Ticked (Big Tick, 1993)
- Reno Dustpunk Summer '95 Sampler (702, 1995)
- Live Benefit Compilation (Self-released, 1995)
- ABCs Of Punk (Whirled, 1997)
- Polyvinyl Record Co. Free Sampler Spring/Summer 1997 (Polyvinyl, 1997)
- UniverSOnoro Volumen 4 (Boa, 1998)
- La Pluie Et Le Beau Temps (Kalikof, 1998)
- Dischord 4 Poland (Dischord/Antena Krzyku/Slowdime/Southern Studios/Brum, 1998)
- ReDirection (Polyvinyl, 1998)
