= Hoover (band) =

American post-hardcore band

- Origin: Washington, D.C., U.S.
- Genres: Post-hardcore, emo
- Years active: 1992–1994, 1997, 2004
- Labels: Dischord, Slowdime, Art Monk Construction, Old Glory
- Past members: Alexander Dunham; Fred Erskine; Christopher Farrall; Joseph P. McRedmond

Hoover was an American post-hardcore band from Washington, D.C. Formed in 1992, Hoover went on to produce some of the more intense music to appear on the Dischord Records label in the 1990s. Compared to Fugazi, Hoover was more experimental and permissive, incorporating elements of jazz and dub, and not limiting themselves to an aggressive stance. Unusually, three of the four members shared vocal duties equally.

Vulture.com listed their song "Electrolux" as one of the greatest emo songs of the early 1990s.

Hoover disbanded in 1994, but have reformed twice: once in 1997 to record a mini-album of 'odds and ends', and again in 2004 for a series of dates in the US and Europe.

== Members ==
- Alexander Dunham – guitar, vocals
- Fred Erskine – bass, vocals, trumpet
- Christopher Farrall – drums
- Joseph P. McRedmond – guitar, vocals

== Discography ==
=== Studio albums ===
- The Lurid Traversal of Route 7 (1994, Dischord)
- Hoover (1998, Slowdime)

=== Singles ===
- "Sidecar Freddie/Cable" (1992, Hoover Union/Dischord)
- "Two-Headed Coin" (split with Lincoln) (1993, Art Monk Construction)
- "Private" (1993, Hoover Union/Dischord)

=== Compilations ===
- All the President's Men (1994, Old Glory)
- 20 Years of Dischord (2002, Dischord)

== Related bands ==
- Abilene - Alex Dunham, Frederick Erskine
- Admiral - Joseph McRedmond
- The Boom - Christopher Farrall, Frederick Erskine
- The Crownhate Ruin - Frederick Erskine, Joseph McRedmond
- Fine Day - Christopher Farrall
- Freddie T. & the People - Frederick Erskine
- HiM - Frederick Erskine
- Hoonah - Frederick Erskine
- June of 44 - Frederick Erskine
- Just a Fire - Frederick Erskine
- Radio Flyer - Alex Dunham
- Regulator Watts - Alex Dunham
- Sea Tiger - Christopher Farrall, Joseph McRedmond
- Sevens - Christopher Farrall
- The Sorts - Christopher Farrall
- Watts Systems Ltd. - Alex Dunham
- Wind of Change - Alex Dunham
