= Dahlia Seed =

American emo band

Background information
- Origin: New Jersey
- Genres: Emo, post-hardcore, indie rock
- Years active: 1992–1996
- Labels: Theologian, Troubleman Unlimited, Spirit of Orr
- Spinoffs: Broken Mouth
- Past members: Tracy Wilson; Chris Skelly; Darin Galgano; Brian Getkin; Mike O'Keefe; Kevin McManus; Jon Procopio

Dahlia Seed was an American emo/post-hardcore band from the New York City/New Jersey area, active from 1992 to 1996.

== History ==
=== 1992-1993: Formation ===
Dahlia Seed began in the summer of 1992, in the northern New Jersey suburbs as a four-piece that played a tight and aggressive version of the indie pop that was prevalent at the time. With all the musicians having a background in the New York hardcore scene, the sound of Dahlia Seed was a bit rougher than the other indie stalwarts of the era, but the most distinctive aspect was lead vocalist Tracy Wilson. Her "in your face" vocal style and delivery, coupled with a raw, and honest "open book" lyrics, made her a unique vocalist of the scene.

Dahlia Seed added a second guitarist, Jon Procopio, in 1993 and proceeded to release their first record, a 10-inch split with Broken Mouth, a side project of members of the band. It wasn't until their third single, a split 7-inch with Greyhouse, that the band started to gain some real notice and popularity. Their side of the split, a song called "Milk", won them new fans, especially from the tight-knit Riot grrrl scene.

=== 1993-1995: Rising popularity ===
1994 saw the release of Valentine Kid's Litter, the band's debut album, culled from various demo recordings done in 1993. Jon Procopio left the band in the summer of 1994 and was replaced with Mike O'Keefe on guitar. Dahlia Seed played extensively in 1994 and early 1995, with bands like Archers of Loaf, Everclear, Built to Spill, Texas is the Reason, Avail, Los Crudos, and Heavens to Betsy, and in the summer of 1995, headed off to Philadelphia to record their album Survived By.

=== 1995-1996: Breakup ===
After production wrapped on Survived By, Dahlia Seed headed out on their first ill-fated US/Canadian tour. Two weeks into the tour, guitarist Mike O'Keefe unexpectedly quit the band, which brought the tour to a halt somewhere in the midwest of America. Dahlia Seed returned home to re-group and added a new guitarist, Kevin McManus. Additionally, a series of shows had to be canceled due to Tracy's throat bleeding from yelling because they didn't have a PA most shows. With the addition of Kevin McManus, 1996 became a banner year for Dahlia Seed. Survived By was released in the spring to much praise. Upon return from the tour, the members of Dahlia Seed decided to disband, and finished up their run with a sold-out farewell show at Maxwell's in Hoboken, New Jersey on August 16, 1996. Some reports had fans as far away as Toronto, and Chicago making the trip for the show, only to be turned away at the door. Later that year, Dahlia Seed posthumously released Please Excuse All The Blood, a compilation that collected singles, compilation tracks, and unreleased material that Dahlia Seed had left scattered about during their four years, including the last three recordings Dahlia Seed did (with Alap Momin of Dälek fame) before their break-up.

=== Post-breakup ===
During Dahlia Seed, Tracy Wilson started recording under the name Ringfinger. Over the span of a decade, she formed together what would eventually be released as Decimal in 2007. The album features collaborations with members of Cave In, Isis, Sunn O))), Jessamine, Fontanelle, Film School, Denali, Engine Down, Dälek, and Darin Galgano, former member of Dahlia Seed. Wilson also formed Positive No in 2012, which released their final album in 2020, and Outer Worlds.

After the break-up, Chris Skelly managed the band's website, posting updates on band members' projects, and posting rare songs from the band's years together. Leftover merch from the band was also made available to buy through the site. The site went down sometime in 2013, but is still able to be accessed through the Wayback Machine. Later, the band's music was made available for free download through their Bandcamp page. Skelly also played in Static in a City and formed Night Battles in 2020. He passed away after a year-long fight from brain cancer on May 25, 2024. On May 6, 2026, The Numero Group announced that Dahlia Seed was joining the label.

== Members ==
- Tracy Wilson – vocals
- Chris Skelly – guitar
- Darin Galgano – drums
- Brian Getkin – bass
- Jon Procopio – guitar (1993-1994)
- Mike O'Keefe – guitar (1994-1995)
- Kevin McManus – guitar (1995-1996)

== Discography ==
=== Albums ===
- Valentine Kid's Litter (1994, Theologian Records)
- Survived By (1995, Troubleman Unlimited)

=== Singles & EPs ===
- Split with Broken Mouth (1993, Jagerlegs)
- Split with Greyhouse (1994, Troubleman Unlimited)
- Teas! (1994, Theologian Records)
- Split with Garden Variety (1994, Mint Tone)
- Split with Mothman (1995, Troubleman Unlimited)
- Split with Cradle (1996, Snowblind)
- Missing Sequences (1996, Troubleman Unlimited)

=== Compilations ===
- Please Excuse All The Blood (1996, Spirit of Orr)

=== Compilation appearances ===
- "Crycord" on Four Bands (1994, Vinyl Communications/Down Side)
- "Standing 8 Count" on Untitled (1996, Marigold Records)
- "Missing Sequences" on The Spandex Experiment (1996, Double Deuce Records)
- "Milk" on Взорванное Небо No.1 (1997, Взорванное Небо)
- "Standing 8 Count" on Your Soldiers In Psychological Warfare (1999, Surefire Distribution)
- "Gregg Leto's Tears" on Genre Non-Specific (2000, Surefire Distribution)
