= The Sorts =

- Origin: Washington, D.C., United States
- Genres: Instrumental rock, post-rock
- Years active: 1994 - ???
- Labels: Aesthetics, Luckyhorse Industries, Slowdime, Southern
- Members: Christopher Farrall; Stuart Fletcher; Joshua LaRue; Carlo Cennamo; Joseph P. McRedmond; Vin Novara

The Sorts are a primarily instrumental post-rock band based in Washington, D.C., and formed in 1994 by Josh LaRue (guitar, vocals), Stuart Fletcher (bass) and Chris Farrall (drums). LaRue, Fletcher and Farrall comprised the band's core, appearing on all recordings, but they have been joined on several releases by Carlo Cennamo (sax), Vin Novara (keyboards) and Joseph P. McRedmond (guitar).

== Discography ==
=== Albums ===
- Common Time (1996)
- This is Gateway Sounds (Spring, 1997)
- More There (Slowdime Records, 1998)
- Hawaiian Bronco (Aesthetics, 1999)
- Contemporary Music (Slowdime Records, 1999)
- Six Plus (Luckyhorse Industries, 2003)

=== Singles ===
- "How Did You Get There?" (Southern Records, 1997)

== Related Bands ==
- Admiral – Joseph McRedmond
- The Boom – Chris Farrall, Josh LaRue
- The Crownhate Ruin – Joseph McRedmond, Vin Novara
- Hoover – Chris Farrall, Joseph McRedmond
- Rain Like the Sound of Trains – Josh LaRue
- Sea Tiger – Chris Farrall, Stuart Fletcher, Josh LaRue, Joseph McRedmond
- Sevens – Chris Farrall, Josh LaRue
