= Shipping News =

American post-rock and post-hardcore band (1996–2012)

- Origin: Louisville, Kentucky
- Genres: Post-rock; math rock; post-hardcore
- Years active: 1996–2012
- Labels: Quarterstick; Initial
- Spinoff of: Rodan; June of 44
- Members: Jason Noble; Jeff Mueller; Kyle Crabtree; Todd Cook

Shipping News was an American post-rock/post-hardcore band. The group formed in the fall of 1996 when members Jason Noble (bass/vocals) and Jeff Mueller (guitar/vocals), who were both in Rodan, collaborated to create music for the Chicago-based syndicated National Public Radio program This American Life. Kyle Crabtree was later recruited as drummer which completed the original lineup. In 2004, Todd Cook, former member of Parlour, The For Carnation, and the reunited Slint, was recruited as bass player.

Shipping News appeared on the Louisville installment of Burn to Shine, a DVD series produced by Fugazi drummer Brendan Canty and filmmaker Christoph Green. It was filmed in November 2005 and was premiered in May 2010 and was due to be released on DVD and download before Christmas 2010. Shipping News bass player Todd Cook also appeared with his other band, Dead Child.

Shipping News takes its name from the 1993 novel The Shipping News, by E. Annie Proulx.

In 2009, Noble was diagnosed with synovial sarcoma. He died in 2012 at the age of 40.

== Discography ==
- 1997: Save Everything - (Quarterstick Records)
- 1998: Shipping News and The Metroschifter split release - (Initial Records)
- 2001: Very Soon, and in Pleasant Company - (Quarterstick Records)
- RMSN EP Series
- 2003: Three-Four - (Quarterstick Records)
- 2005: Flies the Fields - (Quarterstick Records)
- 2010: One Less Heartless To Fear - (Ruminance, Noise Pollution Records)
