= Bluetip =

American rock band

- Origin: Washington D.C., United States
- Genres: Post-hardcore
- Years active: 1995–2002, 2008 (reunion)
- Label: Dischord Records
- Past members: Jason Farrell; James A. Kump; Brian Clancy; Areif Dasha Sless-Kitain; Dave Bryson; Zac Eller; Joe Gorelick; Aaron Ford; Dave Stern

Bluetip was an American rock band from Washington, D.C., forming in March 1995 by ex-members of Swiz. During their initial run, the band toured with such bands as Tool, Melvins, and Hoover.

== History ==
The band, originally named The Ohio Blue Tip, was founded by singer-guitarist jason Farrel, guitarist Dave Stern, bassist Jake Kump, and drummer Zac Eller. Bluetip's debut album Dischord No. 101 was engineered by Don Zientara and produced by Fugazi's Ian MacKaye.

After recording Dischord No. 101, the band played numerous shows, helping them refine and define their sound, which impacted their second album, Join Us, recorded with producer J. Robbins.

After Bluetip's third album, Polymer, was released, drummer Dave Bryson quit and was replaced by former Regulator Watts member Areif Sless-Kitain. The band eventually broke up due to creative differences.

While still playing in Bluetip, Jason Farrell began writing music that differed from the band's usual style, which led him to form Retisonic with former Bluetip and Garden Variety member Joe Gorelick on drums and Jim Kimball on bass. The band Red Hare was formed in 2013 by three former members of Bluetip (Farrell, Gorelick, and Dave Stern) and three former members of both Swiz and Sweetbelly Freakdown (Farrell, Stern, and Shawn Brown. The band has been known to performs Swiz songs in some live performances, in addition to original Red Hare songs.

== Members ==
=== Final lineup ===
- Brian Clancy (guitar, 1999–2001)
- Jason Farrell (guitar/vocals)
- James A. Kump (bass)
- Areif Dasha Sless-Kitain (drums, 2000–2001)

=== Previous members ===
- Dave Bryson (drums, 1998–2000)
- Zac Eller (drums, 1995–1996)
- Joe Gorelick (drums, 1996)
- Aaron Ford (drums, 1996–1998)
- Dave Stern (guitar, 1995–1999)

== Discography ==
=== Studio albums ===
- Dischord No. 101 (Dischord, June 1996)
- Join Us (Dischord, November 1998)
- Polymer (Dischord, September 2000)

=== Singles and EPs ===
- Ohio 7-inch (Discord/Hellfire, August 1995)
- Bluetip/Kerosene 454 split 7-inch (Maggadee, September 1996)
- Join Us/No. 2 7-inch (Dischord, March 1998)
- Bluetip/NRA split 7-inch (B-Core Disc, November 1999)
- Hot (-) Fast (+) Union CDEP (Slowdime, May 2000)

=== Compilation albums ===
- Post Mortem Anthem (Dischord, 2001)

=== Compilation appearances ===
- Not One Light Red: A Desert Extended (Sunset Alliance, 2002) - "Newport"
