= Swiz =

American hardcore punk band

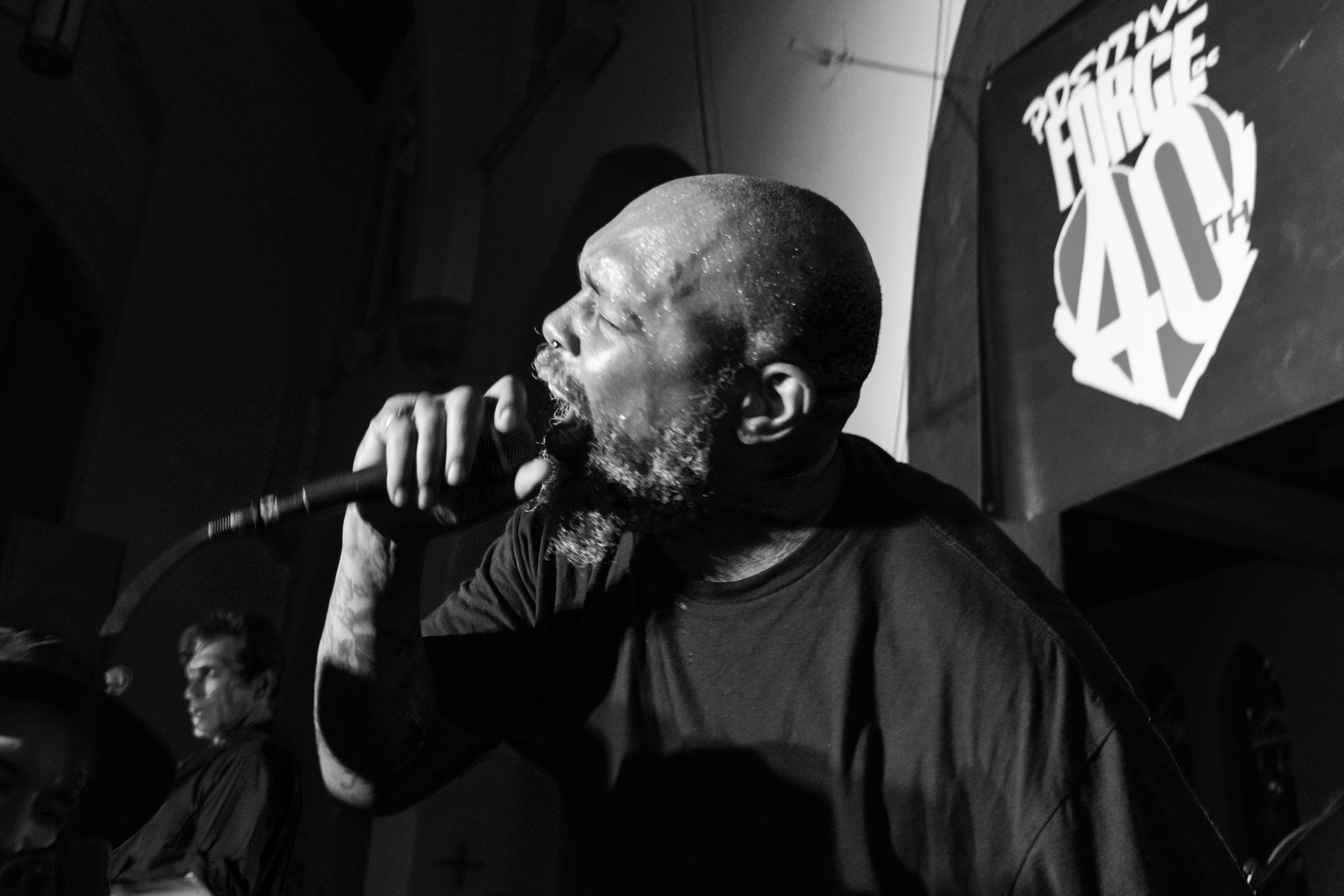
- Swiz in 2025

Background information
- Origin: Washington, D.C., U.S.
- Genres: Hardcore punk; post-hardcore; emo
- Years active: 1987–1990; 2004; 2014; 2025
- Labels: Sammich; Hellfire; Jade Tree; THD
- Spinoffs: Bluetip
- Spinoff of: Dag Nasty
- Past members: Shawn Brown; Jason Farrell; Nathan Larson; Alex Daniels; Ramsey Metcalf; Dave Stern
- Website: jadetree.com/swiz swiz.bandcamp.com

Swiz was an American hardcore punk band from Washington, D.C., formed in 1987. They disbanded in 1990, and have since been described by Vice as "D.C. punk legends."

== History ==
=== Formation ===
The band's founding members were Shawn Brown (vocals) and Ramsey Metcalf (guitar), who later added Nathan Larson (bass), Alex Daniels (drums), and Jason Farrell (guitar) to complete the line-up. Prior to the formation of Swiz, Brown was the original vocalist for Dag Nasty. Metcalf departed shortly after the band recorded their first demo and Swiz continued as a four-piece.

The band began with the goal to move away from the Revolution Summer movement that had emerged within the Washington, D.C., punk scene in 1985. Members felt the intensity and aggressiveness had decreased with the new wave of punk music, and that they resonated more with hardcore punk.

=== Releases and line-up changes ===
Swiz played their first show on June 25, 1987, and did five more before deciding that Metcalf was not a good fit. They released their debut EP, Down, shortly after, and begin touring.

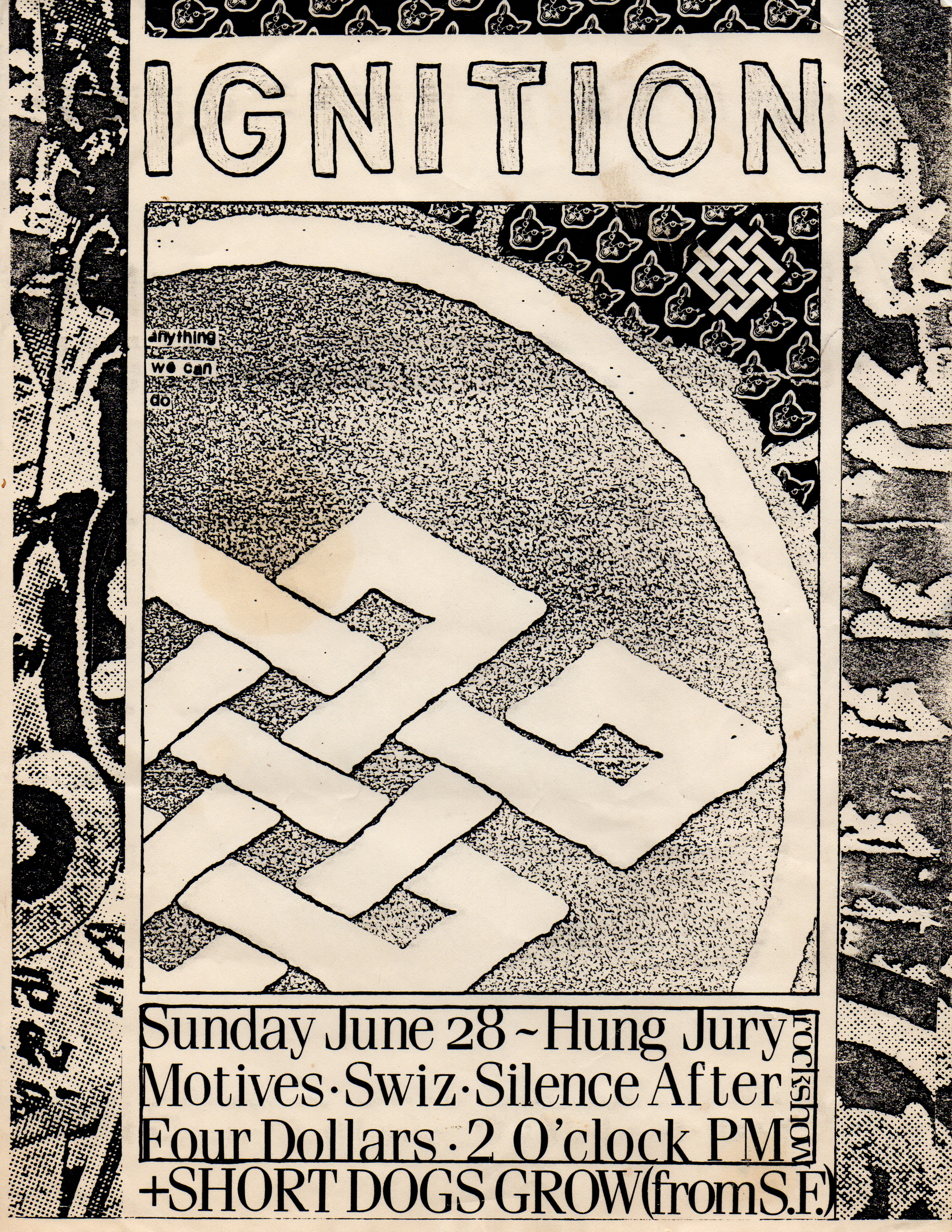
Flyer for a concert featuring Ignition, Swiz, and Short Dogs Grow from the late 80s

Following the release of Down, the band recorded and released their debut self-titled album, Swiz, in 1988 (on Sammich Records). Swiz released their second album, Hell Yes I Cheated, in 1989. The record also included a track by Fury, a short-lived side project that consisted of Farrell, Daniels, Brown on bass, and Chris Thomson (formerly of Ignition, later of Circus Lupus) on vocals.

In 1990, Larson left the band and was soon replaced by Dave Stern, completing what would become the final line-up of Swiz. The band recorded an EP in May of that year, but decided to break up shortly afterwards. The EP, titled With Dave, was released posthumously in 1992 by Jade Tree Records. In 1993, Jade Tree also released No Punches Pulled, a compilation containing the band's entire discography. Later that year, THD Records released a 7" titled Rejects, which contained unused tracks from the Down sessions.

=== Post breakup and recent history ===
After Nathan Larson's departure from the band, he joined Shudder To Think in 1992, and later went into soundtrack work. Jason Farrell and Dave Stern formed Bluetip in 1995. After Bluetip's demise, Farrell formed Retisonic and began working as a graphic designer whose work has since appeared on many records by a number of different bands. Alex Daniels played drums in Severin from 1990 to 1993. In 1996, Brown, Farrell, Stern, and Daniels reunited under the name Sweetbelly Freakdown and released a 7" and an album on Jade Tree. Shawn Brown formed the band Jesuseater afterwards, and currently works as a tattoo artist.

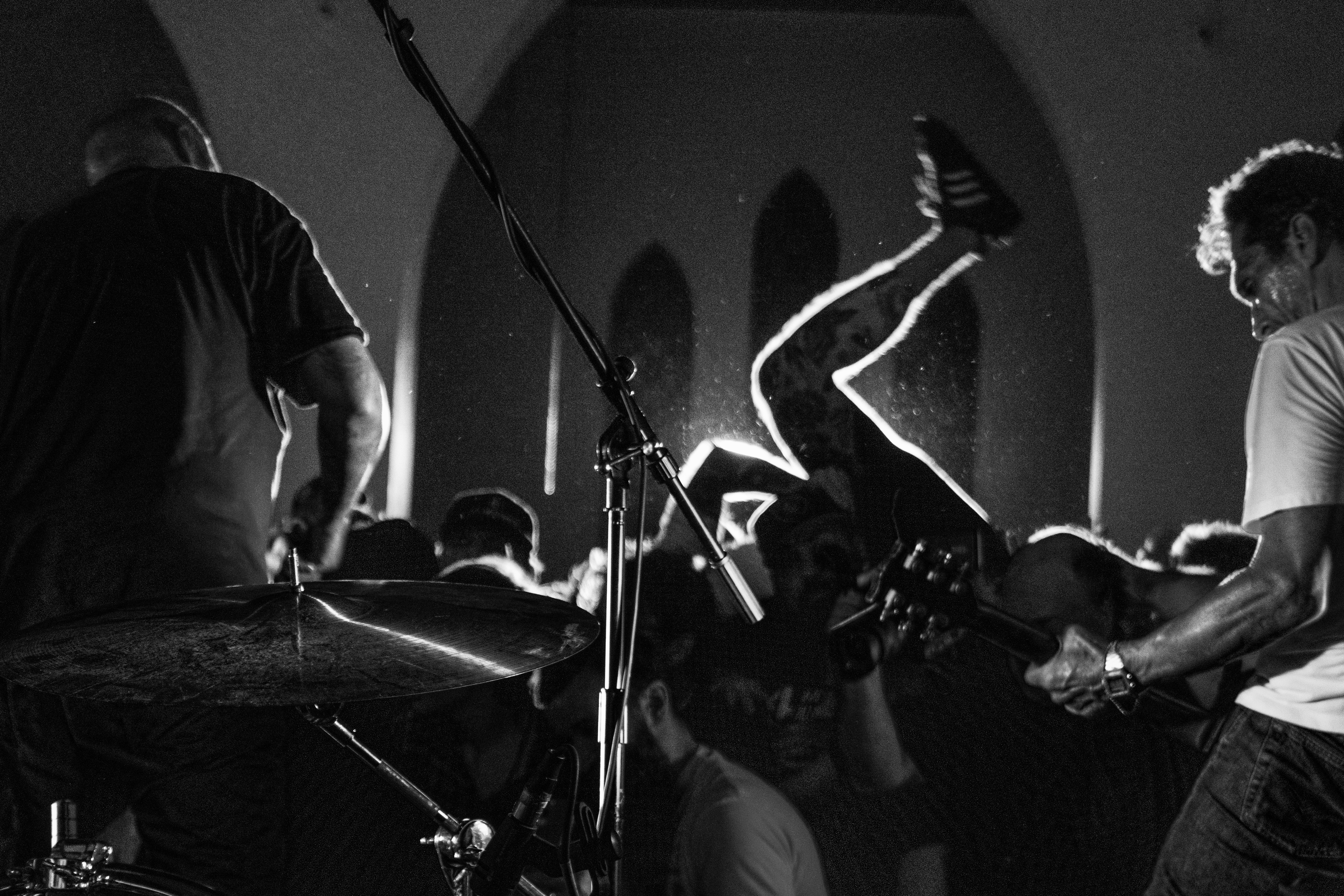
Swiz performing live in 2025

In 2012, Brown, Farrell, and Stern formed a new band called Red Hare.

On December 19, 2014, Swiz reunited for a surprise performance at a Red Hare show at Comet Ping Pong in Washington, D.C. This line-up featured Brown, Farrell, Stern, and Daniels. On the following evening, Swiz played an unannounced 30-minute set at the Black Cat, joining Moss Icon and Soulside for reunion sets.

On May 2nd 2025, it was announced that Swiz would be releasing a 3xLP box set of their complete discography. The limited edition release is a joint effort between Dischord Records and the band's original labels, Sammich and Hellfire. the box set features the band's two full-length albums (Swiz and Hell Yes I Cheated), a compilation of their debut EP and two singles (Down, With Dave, and Rejects), all remastered from the original analog tapes, and an additional 34-page photo book with rare and unseen images.

== Band members ==
=== Final line-up ===
- Shawn Brown – vocals (1987–1990, 2004, 2014)
- Jason Farrell – guitar (1987–1990, 2004, 2014)
- Dave Stern – bass (1990, 2004, 2014)
- Alex Daniels – drums (1987–1990, 2004, 2014)

=== Former members ===
- Ramsey Metcalf – guitar (1987)
- Nathan Larson – bass (1987–1990)

== Discography ==
=== Studio albums ===
- Swiz (1988, Sammich)
- Hell Yes I Cheated (1989, Sammich)

=== Singles and EPs ===
- Down (1987, Hellfire)
- With Dave (1992, Jade Tree)
- Rejects (1993, THD)

=== Compilation albums ===
- No Punches Pulled (1993, Jade Tree)
- With Ramsey (2004, Jade Tree)
- Complete Discography (2025, Sammich/Hellfire)

=== Compilation appearances ===
- Groovy Segway (1987, Thrashing Mad)
- Inbred Records Compilation (1993, Inbred)
- The In-Store Play Sampler (1995, Mordam)
- Flyer Fonts Hardcore Comp (1997, House Industries)
- Significantly Live (2000, Significant)
- Jade Tree Twenty Five Years (2016, Jade Tree)
- Salad Days: Music From The Documentary Film + Additional Unreleased Tracks (2018, New Rose Films, LLC)
