= Idaho (band) =

American rock band

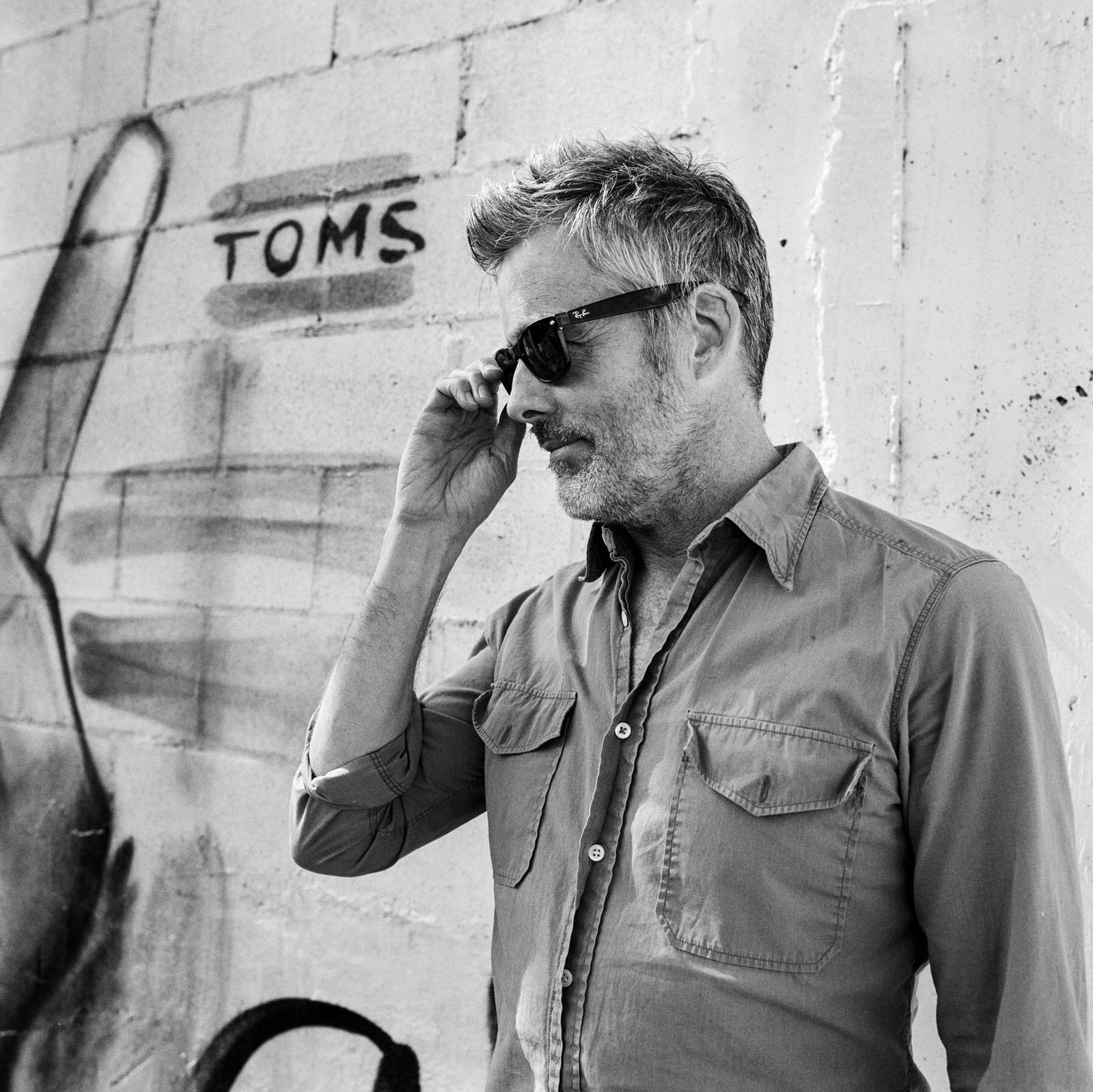
- Jeff Martin co-founder of Idaho (2018)

Background information
- Origin: Los Angeles, California
- Genres: Slowcore, Indie rock, singer-songwriter
- Years active: 1992–present
- Labels: Talitres; Caroline; Buzz; Idaho Music; Retrophonic
- Members: Jeff Martin; Robert Fronzo; Jeff Zimmitti
- Past members: John K. Berry; Dan Seta; Mark Lewis; Terry Borden; Jim Brown; John Gold; Maya Rudolph; Joey Waronker
- Website: http://www.idahomusic.com/

Idaho is an American rock band formed in 1992 in Los Angeles, California. Idaho was a key band in the 1990s slowcore genre.

== History ==
Idaho was formed by high school friends Jeff Martin and John K. Berry who had played in various bands and projects together since 1981. The duo, who switched off on drumming duties and shared in the songwriting, were eventually signed to Caroline Records in December 1992 by Brian Long, and soon after released The Palms EP and Year After Year full-length in 1993. Idaho drew frequent comparisons to American Music Club, Red House Painters, and Codeine, due to vocal, lyrical, and instrumental similarities. The band toured the United States with similar-minded artists such as Red House Painters, Half String, Low, and Cranes from 1993 to 1995. Dan Seta joined as a multi-instrumentalist on Three Sheets to the Wind, the band's third album, along with Terry Borden on bass (later of the Pete Yorn band) and Mark Lewis (West Indian Girl) on drums. Seta and Lewis had previously been in the band Pet Clarke together, along with Geoff Gans and former Let's Active touring bassist Janine Cooper, who went on to join Downy Mildew. Idaho also played dates in Europe with Lali Puna and Dirty Three.

Martin had recorded some solo songs (including "Never Back Again") in 1984 in the United Kingdom, but a solo career beyond Idaho never materialized. Idaho's sonic stylings range from existentially introspective songs to cathartic screaming, though their music falls in the first category the majority of the time. Their music is traditionally categorized as slowcore or sadcore. The band has released nine full-length albums, as well as numerous EPs and singles, dating back to 1992. Idaho has become primarily the vehicle of singer-songwriter Martin, who has performed the most recent of Idaho's albums almost entirely on his own and remains the band's sole songwriter and principal musician. His foreboding four-string tenor guitar playing (he has had several such guitars custom-made for him) is a hallmark of most Idaho albums, though later releases rely more heavily on piano, and their 2005 release, The Lone Gunman, often eschews traditional song structures for more instrumental experimentation. The band's 1998 album Alas featured vocals on a few songs by Melissa Auf der Maur.

In December 2008 Idaho contributed their track "Santa Claus Is Weird" to an Indiecater Records festive compilation titled An Indiecater Christmas. Martin has also contributed music for U.S. television shows, films, and documentaries.

On January 9, 2016, founding member John K. Berry died in his sleep. The 2017 Idaho compilation People Like us Didn't Stop (Live, Volume 2) was dedicated to him.

In June 2019 Director Mark Davis began filming interviews for a documentary about Idaho entitled Traces of Glory which was released in late 2021. In the summer of 2021 Idaho toured for the first time since 2001. The current band consists of Jeff Martin and Robert Fronzo. In April 2024 Idaho announced their first album in thirteen years Lapse would be released May 31. In its first week, the album debuted in the number 8 spot on the College radio chart.

== Discography ==
=== Albums ===
- Year After Year (1993, Caroline)
- This Way Out (1994, Caroline)
- Three Sheets to the Wind (1996, Caroline)
- Alas (1998, Buzz)
- Hearts of Palm (2000, Idaho Music)
- Levitate (2001, Idaho Music)
- The Lone Gunman (2005, Idaho Music)
- You Were A Dick (2011, Idaho Music)
- The Broadcast of Disease (collection of songs recorded between 1983 and 1989 by Jeff Martin, John Berry, and Doug Smith) (2015, Idaho Music)
- Lapse (2024, Idaho Music)

=== Compilation and live albums ===
- People Like Us Should Be Stopped (Live, Volume 1) (2000, Idaho Music) (Recorded December 11, 1993, at Downtown Performing Arts Center in Tucson, AZ)
- We Were Young And Needed The Money (compilation of rare and previously unissued songs from '92 to '00) (2002, Idaho Music)
- Vieux Carré (compilation released in Germany) (2004, Kalinkaland)
- People Like Us Didn't Stop (Live, Volume 2) (2017)
- The Devil You Know 1992-1996 (2024, Arts & Crafts)
- Live at Club 603 Vevey (2026)
- Rehearsals '21 (2026)

=== Singles ===
- "Skyscrape" (b/w "Star") 7" (1993, Ringer's Lactate)
- "Fuel" (b/w "Hail Mary") 7" (1993, Caroline)
- Drive It (b/w "Sweep") 7" (released with two additional tracks in its CD format) (1994, Quigley)
- "Pomegranate Bleeding" (b/w "The Right Escape") 7" (1996, Caroline)
- Happy Times (split single with "Indian Summer" by Cobalt) 7" (2000, SNC Empire)
- Straw Dogs (split single with "Narcolepsy Lake" and "You Packed Your Things" by Dakota Suite) 7" (2002, Misplaced Music)
- To Be The One (2004, Kalinkaland)

=== EPs ===
- The Palms E.P. (1993, Caroline)
- The Bayonet EP (released with extra tracks in its 10" vinyl format) (1995, Fingerpaint)
- The Forbidden EP (1997, Buzz)
- Star EP (2024. Arts & Crafts)
