= Three Sheets to the Wind =

Studio album by Idaho
- Released: 1996
- Studio: Piercing Sound
- Genre: Alternative rock
- Label: Caroline
- Producer: Martin Brumbach

Idaho chronology
The Bayonet EP (1995)	Three Sheets to the Wind (1996)	The Forbidden EP (1997)

Three Sheets to the Wind is an album by the American band Idaho, released in 1996.

Idaho promoted the album by touring with Low and Trans Am. It was a commercial disappointment, leading Caroline Records to drop the band.

== Production ==
The album was produced by Martin Brumbach. Frontman Jeff Martin retained the same musicians who had recorded The Bayonet EP, allowing for more of a “band sound”. Martin used a 4-string guitar on the album. Three Sheets to the Wind was one of the first albums to employ High Definition Compatible Digital.

== Critical reception ==
Professional ratings
Review scores
Source	Rating
AllMusic	4.5/5 stars
MusicHound Rock: The Essential Album Guide	3/5 stars

Trouser Press wrote that "Mark Lewis' brushed drumming gives 'If You Dare' a nearly jazzy feel, while 'Catapult' ventures onto classic rock-turf, with Martin’s baritone sacrificing some of its monochromatic intensity in favor of a gritty virility." The Washington Post determined that the band "creates a potent tension within a narrow dynamic range, but Wind isn't trapped in the cocktail lounge... Melding tinkling piano with guitar feedback, the band rightfully serves its own elegant songs rather than mere genre revivalism."

Guitar Player thought that "Martin's and Dan Seta's guitars envelop the mind like mist on a dark, foggy afternoon." The Albuquerque Journal stated that Wind "handles the delicate Idaho sound Martin crafted on the first album and roughs it up a bit, slapping in an off-key vocal here and a screech of feedback there to give Martin's songs a bit of grit to take your ears away from the sad sounds." The Baltimore Sun concluded that the album "dilutes the pop melancholy of Jeff Martin's melodies with artfully deployed bursts of guitar dissonance."

The State listed Three Sheets to the Wind as the fifth best album of 1996. Nashville Scene also considered the album to be one of the best of the year.

AllMusic stated: "The overall result is a bit less sleepy than previous efforts, though Martin's downtrodden vision, reminiscent of Mark Eitzel, is still firmly in place. His distinct guitar sound—emanating from a four-stringed instrument with odd tunings—is still here also, as are his great chordal instincts."

== Track listing ==
No.	Title	Length
1.	"If You Dare"
2.	"Catapult"
3.	"Pomegranate Bleeding"
4.	"Shame"
5.	"Stare at the Sky"
6.	"No Ones Watching"
7.	"Alive Again"
8.	"A Sound Awake"
9.	"Glass Bottom"
10.	"Get You Back"
