= Frigid Stars LP =

Studio album by Codeine
- Released: February 1991
- Recorded: July–August 1990
- Genres: Slowcore, indie rock
- Length: 41:15
- Labels: Glitterhouse, Sub Pop
- Producers: Codeine, Mike McMackin

Codeine chronology
Frigid Stars LP (1991)	Barely Real (1992)

Singles from Frigid Stars LP
- 1. "Pickup Song" Released: 1990; 2. "D" Released: 1991

Frigid Stars LP is the debut album by American indie rock band Codeine. It was released in February 1991 on Glitterhouse in Europe and in May 1991 on Sub Pop in the United States. The album was released to generally positive reviews and is regarded as being one of the pioneering albums in the slowcore genre.

"New Year's" is a cover of a track co-written by Bitch Magnet singer Sooyoung Park. Park did not record the track himself until 1992, with new band Seam. Park is featured on the song "Summer Dresses", which can be found on the 2012 expanded reissue by the label The Numero Group. This edition also placed "3 Angels" to the fourth track on the album. "Cave-In" has been covered by rock band Cave In and appears on their compilation album Anomalies, Vol. 1. The song title was the inspiration for their band name.

The phrase "frigid stars" is taken from a line in the song "Crap Rap 2" by the Fall from their 1979 album Live at the Witch Trials. The cover artwork was designed by Tammi Colichio, using a color-inverted telescope image of a star cluster.

== Critical reception ==
Professional ratings
Review scores
Source	Rating
AllMusic	4.5/5 stars
NME	7/10
Pitchfork	8.8/10
Record Collector	5/5 stars
Spin	7/10
Uncut	8/10

The St. Petersburg Times noted that "comparisons to Spacemen 3 and Galaxie 500 have been made, but Codeine is on a purer, more simplistic level." In 2008, Frigid Stars LP was chosen by Pitchfork as one of the 20 best Sub Pop albums.

== Track listing ==
All tracks are written by Codeine, except "New Year's", written by Sooyoung Park and Lexi Mitchell.

No.	Title	Length
1.	"D"	4:27
2.	"Gravel Bed"	3:58
3.	"Pickup Song"	2:44
4.	"New Year's" (Seam cover)	3:34
5.	"Second Chance"	4:45
6.	"Cave-In"	3:37
7.	"Cigarette Machine"	4:42
8.	"Old Things"	4:59
9.	"3 Angels"	4:51
10.	"Pea"	3:38
Total length:		41:15

The Numero Group reissue bonus tracks
No.	Title	Length
11.	"Castle" (demo)	4:29
12.	"Skeletons" (demo)	1:48
13.	"3 Angels" (demo)	3:26
14.	"Corner Store" (demo)	5:20
15.	"Summer Dresses" (demo)	1:56
16.	"Pea" (acoustic)	3:34
17.	"Second Chance" (demo)	4:13
18.	"Pickup Song" (demo)	2:37
19.	"Cave-In" (demo)	3:06
20.	"Kitchen"	2:15
Total length:		73:59

== Personnel ==
Codeine

- Chris Brokaw – drums, guitar
- John Engle – guitar
- Stephen Immerwahr – bass guitar, vocals, all instruments on demo versions of "Pea", "Second Chance", "Pickup Song", "Cave-In", and "Kitchen"

Additional personnel

- Mike McMackin – piano on "Pea"
- Peter Pollack – drums on "Castle", "Skeletons", and "3 Angels"
- Sooyoung Park – bass on demo version of "Summer Dresses"

Production

- Mike McMackin – production, recording
- Laura Larson – photography
- Tammi Colichio – cover art
