= June of 44 =

American rock band

- Origin: Louisville, Kentucky, U.S.
- Genres: Post-hardcore; math rock; post-rock
- Years active: 1994–1999; 2018–present
- Labels: Quarterstick; Konkurrent
- Spinoffs: Shipping News; HiM
- Spinoff of: Rodan
- Members: Fred Erskine; Sean Meadows; Jeff Mueller; Doug Scharin

June of 44 is an American rock band which was formed in 1994 from ex-members of Rodan, Lungfish, Rex, and Hoover. The band's name refers to the period during which writers Henry Miller and Anaïs Nin corresponded.

The band toured extensively, reaching as far as Australia. They were a collective from 1994 to 2000, and reunited in 2018. Their style consists of a post-hardcore and math rock base, while their later releases delve into experimental jazz, ambient dub and angular post-punk.

Their debut album Engine Takes to the Water (1995) drew comparisons with both Slint and Will Oldham. The following year's Tropics and Meridians saw the band compared to Tortoise and The For Carnation. Drummer Doug Scharin had started HiM as a side project, which sometimes also featured bassist Fred Erskine, and Scharin also later started the avant-garde band Out in Worship. Meadows also had a side project, forming Sonora Pine with Tara Jane O'Neill. June of 44 released three further albums, incorporating more electronics and jazz influences, before the band split up in 1999, with vocalist/guitarist Jeff Mueller forming Shipping News and vocalist Sean Meadows forming Everlasting the Way and later Letter E. Erskine joined Abilene, while Scharin continued with HiM, also guesting with several other bands.

The band reunited in 2018 and released a new album titled Revisionist: Adaptations & Future Histories in the Time of Love and Survival in 2020, consisting of rerecordings and remixes of songs from Anahata, In The Fishtank 6, and Four Great Points. Mueller personally expressed that the band felt a lot of the material from Anahata was underdeveloped. In 2025, Mueller and Meadows began performing as a duo under the name Flowting Clowds, and performed several shows in the Northern US for the release of their debut single. In January 2026, the live album Live in Tokyo was announced featuring a 6-song setlist played at Club Fever in Tokyo, Japan, on March 9, 2023.

== Members ==
- Fred Erskine – bass guitar
- Sean Meadows – vocals, guitar
- Jeff Mueller – vocals, guitar
- Doug Scharin – drums

== Discography ==
=== Studio albums ===
- Engine Takes to the Water (1995)
- Tropics and Meridians (1996)
- Four Great Points (1998)
- Anahata (1999)
- Revisionist: Adaptations & Future Histories in the Time of Love and Survival (2020)

=== Live albums ===
- In the Fishtank 6 (1999)
- "South East Boston" / "Dexterity of Luck" (2001)
- LIVE IN TOKYO (2026)

=== EPs ===
- The Anatomy of Sharks (1997)
