= Sean Meadows =

American musician

- Origin: Chattanooga, Tennessee, United States
- Genres: Math rock; post-hardcore
- Occupation: Musician
- Instruments: Guitar; bass guitar; vocals
- Years active: 1994–present
- Member of: June of 44; HiM; Flowting Clowds
- Formerly of: The Sonora Pine; Lungfish

Sean Meadows is an American musician best known as a founding member of June of 44 and The Sonora Pine for which he sang and played guitar. He also played bass guitar with Lungfish and HiM and has performed with many lesser known bands based in Chattanooga, Tennessee.

As of 2025, Meadows and June Of 44 bandmate Jeff Mueller play as a duo under the name Flowting Clowds (stylized as FLOWTING CLOWDS). Their first single released on November 14, 2025, and several shows in the Northern US were played in support.
