= HiM (American band) =

American post-rock group

HiM is a dub-influenced post-rock group formed in 1995 by Doug Scharin, drummer for the bands Codeine, Rex and June of 44. Their first album, Egg, was their most dub-based effort. Each successive album has gone more in a quasi-world music direction. After some recording for Crooklyn Dub Consortium and Wordsound, Interpretive Belief System, HiM settled on a lineup of Scharin with Bundy K. Brown, Rob Mazurek and Jeff Parker, members or occasional members of Tortoise and Isotope 217. Their first album was the underground hit Sworn Eyes, produced by Doug Scharin. A few personnel changes followed, and the revamped lineup including members of June of 44. HiM released Our Point of Departure in 1999, which signified a very clear shift toward a more jazz-like sound, followed by a major American and European tour. In 2003, HiM released Many in High Places Are Not Well on Fat Cat Records, which was received as their most successful and fully realized release. Peoples was released in mid-2006, featuring a cleaner sound with more vocals than any of HiM's previous releases. Included in this line-up are Martin Perna and Jordan McLean from Antibalas, Griffin Rodriguez from Need New Body/Icy Demons, Adam Pierce (Mice Parade). The latest HiM records, 1110 and ん, released in 2008 and 2009 on Afterhours in Tokyo, are collaborations between Doug Scharin, Josh Larue and the Tokyo-based group, Ultra Living.

== Discography ==
- Crooklyn Dub Consortium – Certified Dope Vol. 1 (CD) Chemical Mix – 1995 WordSound
- Egg – 1996 Southern Records
- Crooklyn Dub Consortium. Certified Dope, Vol. 2 (CD) Tradition – 1996 WordSound
- Chill and Peel (12") – 1996 Southern Records
- Macro Dub Infection Volume 2 (2xCD, Comp) Liquid Boy – 1996 Virgin
- Changes / The Focus (12") – 1997 Soul Static Sound
- HiM / The Dylan Group – 1997 Bubble Core
- Interpretive Belief System – 1997 WordSound
- Sworn Eyes – 1999 Perishable Records
- 5/6 In Dub (12") – 2000 Afterhours
- Our Point of Departure – 2000 Perishable Records
- New Features – 2001 Bubble Core
- Remix Series #1: Japan (12") – 2002 Afterhours/FatCat Records
- Many in High Places Are Not Well – 2003 Bubble Core/FatCat Records
- Lila (12", S/Sided, Etch) – 2003 Galaxia
- Nantes(live) – 2004 Afterhours
- 15/15: Collaborations Of Sound And Visuals (CD) Hot Planes Advancing / cool planes receding – 2004 Afterhours
- Crooklyn Dub Outernational – Certified Dope Vol. 4: Babylon's Burning (CD) Disco Lips – 2004 WordSound
- Music For Plants (2xCD) Moss Garden – 2005 PerfectIfOn
- Sprout: The Soundtrack From the Surf Movie by Thomas Campbell – "Of The Periphery" – 2005 Brushfire Records
- Peoples – 2006 Bubble Core
- 1110 – 2008 Afterhours (Japan)
- ん – 2009 Afterhours (Japan) / 2010 HipHipHip (Europe)
