= Fred Erskine =

American bass guitarist

- Born: Frederick T. Erskine
- Genres: Math rock, post-hardcore
- Occupation: Musician
- Instruments: Bass guitar, trumpet, vocals
- Years active: 1987–present

Frederick T. Erskine is an American bass guitarist best known as a member of the band Hoover. In addition to being a member of multiple groups from the D.C. area, such as The Crownhate Ruin and The Sorts, he also played with the Louisville band June of 44.

== Biography ==
Frederick T. Erskine began his foray into music at the age of four when he started learning to play violin. He began expanding his musical palette and soon picked up playing the piano until he settled on learning the trumpet when he was eight. In November 1987, Erskine had begun performing vocals for a punk band which led to him picking up the bass.
