= Doug Scharin =

American drummer

- Born: Douglas Arthur Scharin; West Hartford, Connecticut, United States
- Genres: Math rock, post-rock
- Occupation: Musician
- Instrument: Drummer
- Years active: 1980s–present

Douglas Arthur Scharin is an American drummer and percussionist. He has served as a member of a multitude of bands, including Codeine, Rex, HiM, Enablers, June of 44, Loftus and Mice Parade. He currently resides in San Diego, California.

== Biography ==
Douglas Arthur Scharin was born and grew up in West Hartford, Connecticut. As a teenager, he became interested in music while listening to his mother's boyfriend perform drums in his band Son. Bassist and composer Bill Laswell was also a member of the band and taught Scharin to play drums and bass. In 1994, Scharin received attention for his drumming after he joined the slowcore group Codeine for their second album The White Birch. After Codeine disbanded, Scharin founded Rex and HiM in 1995.

In 2006, Scharin started an experimental music project named Activities of Dust. The idea for the project came after Scharin had accumulated hours' worth of feedback recordings, which he had recorded over the course of 2006. He decided to enlist Jeff Parker, Bill Laswell and Bernie Worrell to help him experiment and build off these recordings. The finished compositions were compiled and released as A New Mind in 2008.

== Discography ==
- A New Mind (Adluna, 2008)
