= Karl Hill (disambiguation) =

Karl Hill may refer to:

- Karl Hill (1831–93), German baritone opera singer
- Karl Hill (musician) (born 1975), British-American rock and roll guitarist and drummer; member of Government Issue, Sorry About Your Daughter, and The Factory Incident

== See also ==
- Carl Hill (disambiguation)
- Hill (surname)
