= Charles Hill =

Charles, Charley, or Charlie Hill may refer to:

== Arts and entertainment ==
- Charles Hill (painter) (1824–1915), engraver, painter and arts educator in South Australia
- Charles Christopher Hill (born 1948), American artist and printmaker
- Charlie Hill (1951–2013), Native American stand-up comic

== Politics ==
- Charles A. Hill (politician) (1833–1902), U.S. representative from Illinois
- Charles A. Hill (activist) (1893–1970), American activist and minister
- Charles Lumley Hill (1840–1909), pastoralist, businessman and politician in Queensland, Australia
- Charles L. Hill (1869–1957), American political candidate (Wisconsin)

== Sports ==
- Charles Hill (cyclist) (1886–1961), British Olympic cyclist
- Charley Hill (baseball) (fl. 1912–1924), American baseball player
- Charles Hill (cricketer) (1903–1982), Irish cricketer
- Charlie Hill (footballer) (1918–1998), Welsh footballer
- Charlie Hill (boxer) (1930–2010), Scottish boxer
- Charles Hill (American football) (born 1980), American football player
- Charlie Hill (cricketer) (born 1985), English cricketer

== Others ==
- Charles Hill (industrialist) (1816–1889), Swedish industrialist of English origin
- Charles Shattuck Hill (1868–after 1909), American civil engineer, author and editor
- Charles Rowland Clegg-Hill, 6th Viscount Hill (1876–1957), British peer
- Charles Hill, Baron Hill of Luton (1904–1989), English administrator, doctor and television executive
- Charles Hill (diplomat) (1936–2021), American diplomat and scholar
- Charles E. Hill (1881–1936), professor of political science at George Washington University
- Charles C. Hill (born 1945), Canadian curator
- Charles D. Hill (1873–1926), American architect
- Charles W. L. Hill, British-born academic
- Charles Blair Hill (died 2011), American man shot to death by two BART police officers in San Francisco
- Charley Hill (detective) (1947–2021), British art crime investigator

== Other uses ==
- Charles Hill, Botswana, a village in Botswana
- Charles Hill & Sons, former shipbuilder and shipyard in Bristol, England

== See also ==
- Charles D. Hilles (1867–1949), American politician (New York state)
- Hill (surname)
- Carl Hill (disambiguation)
- Charleshill
