= Sorry About Your Daughter =

American rock band

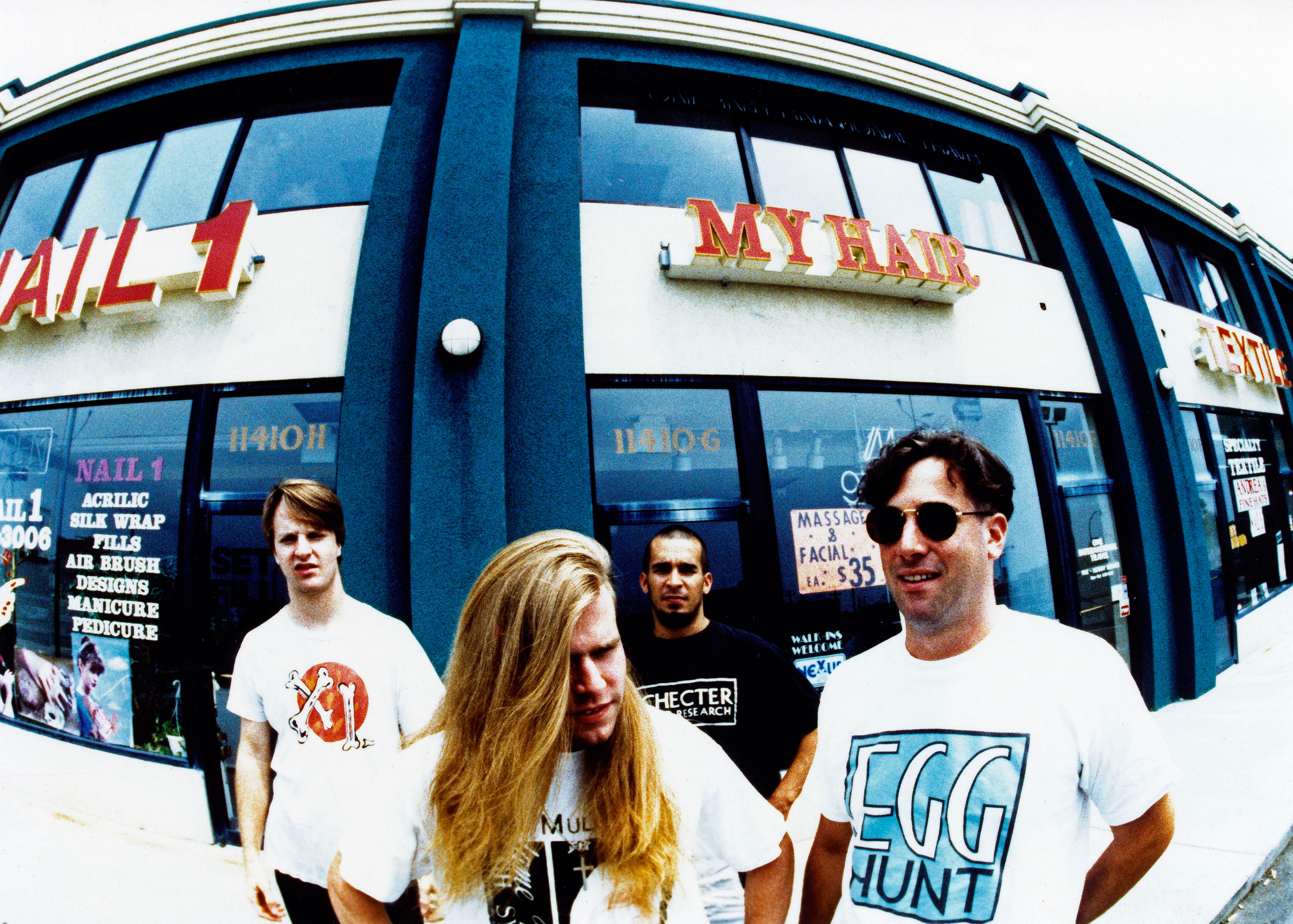
- Sorry About Your Daughter in Wheaton, Maryland, 1995

Background information
- Origin: Washington, D.C., U.S.
- Genres: Alternative rock; Post-hardcore
- Years active: 1992–1997, 2019, 2025–present
- Labels: Edel; Marlboro Music; IDE; Diesel Boy Records
- Members: Glenn Hall; Jeff Aug; Aaron Wertlieb; Karl Hill
- Website: Official website

Sorry About Your Daughter is an American alternative rock and post-hardcore band from Washington, D.C., United States. Known for their melodic yet intense sound, they gained recognition in the 1990s through extensive college and European touring. The band released two full-length albums on the German label Edel/Marlboro Music, and their videos for “You Gave Up” and “Scapegoat” received rotation on MTV Europe and MuchMusic. After disbanding in 1997, the members pursued separate musical projects before reuniting in 2019 and again in 2025.

== History ==
=== Formation and early years (1992–1994) ===
Sorry About Your Daughter formed in 1992 in the Washington, D.C., area. Their music blended elements of alternative rock and post-hardcore, reflecting influences from local bands such as Jawbox and Shudder to Think. Vocalist Glenn Hall credited Fugazi’s Ian MacKaye as an early mentor and influence on the band’s DIY ethic.

The band quickly developed a following through energetic live performances across D.C. clubs and U.S. college campuses. Their debut album, Aquarium Center, was released independently in 1994 on Diesel Boy Records.

=== European success and touring (1995–1997) ===
In 1995, the group signed to the German label Edel through its Marlboro Music imprint, which reissued Aquarium Center in Europe. The band toured extensively throughout Europe to support the release. Their second album, Face (1996), featured the single “Scapegoat,” accompanied by a music video that appeared on MTV Europe and MuchMusic.

Sorry About Your Daughter’s sound evolved during this period, combining melodic hooks with dynamic post-hardcore structures. Their touring and international exposure helped build a cult following overseas, particularly in Germany and the U.K.

The band disbanded in 1997 following their European tour.

=== Member projects and hiatus (1998–2018) ===
After the breakup, members pursued separate musical paths. Guitarist Jeff Aug released a series of instrumental albums and began performing with British spoken-word and electronic artist Anne Clark. Drummer Karl Hill joined John Stabb’s post-hardcore project The Factory Incident and later performed with a reformed lineup of Government Issue.

=== Reunions (2019–present) ===
On August 17, 2019, the band reunited for a sold-out performance at The Soundry in Columbia, Maryland, marking their first show in 22 years.

In 2025, Sorry About Your Daughter formally reconvened to announce the Atlantic to Adrenaline Tour, a series of anniversary performances across the United States and Europe scheduled for the summer of 2026.

== Members ==
- Glenn Hall – lead vocals
- Jeff Aug – guitar, backing vocals
- Aaron Wertlieb – bass, backing vocals
- Karl Hill – drums, backing vocals

== Discography ==
Title	Year	Label(s)	Format(s)	Notes
Aquarium Center	1994	Diesel Boy Records	CD, Cassette	Reissued 1995 by Edel/Marlboro Music/IDE
Face	1996	Edel/Marlboro Music/IDE	CD	Includes singles “You Gave Up” and “Scapegoat”
Afterbirth	2019	Sorry About Your Daughter Media	Digital EP	Reunion release

=== EPs and singles ===
Title	Year	Label	Type	Notes
Six Bucks	1995	Diesel Boy Records	EP	Early independent release
You Gave Up	1995	Edel/Marlboro Music/IDE	Single	Video aired on MTV Europe
Scapegoat	1996	Edel/Marlboro Music/IDE	Single	Video aired on MTV Europe
Something About '94	1996	Edel/Marlboro Music/IDE	Single	European release
