= Peter Moffett =

Peter Mof(f)at(t) or Moffett may refer to:

- Peter Moffat (born 1962), British playwright and screenwriter
- Peter Moffatt (1922–2007), English television director
- Peter Moffett (drummer), for the bands Government Issue and Wool
- Peter Davison, real name Peter Moffett, (born 1951), British actor
