= Complete History Volume Two =

Complete History Volume One

Compilation album by Government Issue
- Released: January 22, 2002
- Recorded: 1987–1989
- Genre: Hardcore punk
- Length: 148:50
- Label: Dr. Strange
- Producer: Tom Lyle, Government Issue

Government Issue chronology
Complete History Volume One (2000)	Complete History Volume One (2002)	The Punk Remains the Same (2009)

Complete History Volume Two is a compilation album by the Washington, D.C. hardcore punk band Government Issue, compiling the band's recordings from 1987 to 1989. It was released January 22, 2002 through Dr. Strange Records as a sequel to 2000's Complete History Volume One. Together, the two Complete History albums collect nearly all of the band's recorded output. While Volume One included contributions from a number of musicians—as singer John Stabb and drummer Marc Alberstad were the band's only constant members from 1980 to 1986—Volume Two is entirely composed of recordings by the band's final lineup of Stabb, guitarist Tom Lyle, bass guitarist J. Robbins, and drummer Peter Moffett.

== Reception ==
Jack Rabid of Allmusic gave Complete History Volume Two three stars out of five, calling it "a rare case where a Volume Two is the far superior" and attributing the addition of Robbins and Moffett with completing Government Issue's evolution from "an inferior hardcore-thrash band" to something more original. He cited You as the turning point, calling it "a quantum leap in hefty, precise, pure power" and stating that "[Robbins and Moffett's] added harmonies (especially), superb playing, chops, and dexterity fit perfect with Stabb and guitarist Tom Lyle's clear plan to cut all ties with lame hardcore cretins — while maintaining the big-guitar edge and bomb-running melodies of their punk roots." He noted elements of psychedelic rock in the music and hints of The Damned in Stabb's singing, and remarked that the addition of Crash and the second disc of live recordings "makes [Volume Two] an even more rock-solid pick-up."

== Track listing ==
All songs written and composed by Government Issue.

Disc one

You, 1987
No.	Title	Length
1.	"Jaded Eyes"	3:50
2.	"Beyond"	2:14
3.	"Man in a Trap"	3:10
4.	"Caring Line"	3:34
5.	"Young Love"	4:22
6.	"Where You Live"	3:18
7.	"Wishing"	2:16
8.	"Public Stage"	3:28
9.	"World, You and I"	2:18
10.	"Hole in the Scene"	4:05
11.	"Melancholy Miss"	2:07

From F-R-5, 1987
No.	Title	Length
12.	"Public Stage" (live at The Marble Bar, Baltimore, Maryland, March 20, 1987)	3:31

Crash, 1988
No.	Title	Length
13.	"Another Day"	3:32
14.	"Strange Wine"	3:11
15.	"Better Than TV"	2:46
16.	"Time Will Rearrange"	4:20
17.	"Connecticut"	3:55
18.	"Crash"	3:16
19.	"The Price"	3:51
20.	"The Fear"	3:47
21.	"Summer of Blood"	3:18
22.	"For Ever"	3:56
Total length:		74:05

Disc two

Finale, 1988
No.	Title	Length
1.	"Strange Wine" (live on KFJC-FM, Los Altos Hills, California, October 11, 1988)	3:21
2.	"Where You Live" (live on KFJC-FM, Los Altos Hills, California, October 11, 1988)	3:07
3.	"Blending In" (live on KFJC-FM, Los Altos Hills, California, October 11, 1988)	1:12
4.	"Understand" (live on KFJC-FM, Los Altos Hills, California, October 11, 1988)	1:47
5.	"Better Than TV" (live on KFJC-FM, Los Altos Hills, California, October 11, 1988)	2:37
6.	"Jaded Eyes" (live on KFJC-FM, Los Altos Hills, California, October 11, 1988)	3:08
7.	"Mad at Myself" (live on KFJC-FM, Los Altos Hills, California, October 11, 1988)	1:39
8.	"Beyond" (live on KFJC-FM, Los Altos Hills, California, October 11, 1988)	2:01
9.	"Wishing" (live on KFJC-FM, Los Altos Hills, California, October 11, 1988)	1:59
10.	"The Price" (live on KFJC-FM, Los Altos Hills, California, October 11, 1988)	3:33
11.	"Public Stage" (live on KFJC-FM, Los Altos Hills, California, October 11, 1988)	3:11
12.	"Connecticut" (live on KFJC-FM, Los Altos Hills, California, October 11, 1988)	3:45
13.	"It Begins Now" (live on KFJC-FM, Los Altos Hills, California, October 11, 1988)	2:17
14.	"Last Forever" (live at The Ritz, New York City, February 4, 1988)	2:36
15.	"Wishing" (live at The Ritz, New York City, February 4, 1988)	2:08
16.	"Another Day" (live at The Ritz, New York City, February 4, 1988)	3:17
17.	"Understand" (live at The Ritz, New York City, February 4, 1988)	1:52
18.	"Beyond" (live at The Ritz, New York City, February 4, 1988)	2:07
19.	"Mad at Myself" (live at The Ritz, New York City, February 4, 1988)	1:41
20.	"Forever" (live at The Ritz, New York City, February 4, 1988)	3:25
21.	"Jaded Eyes" (live at The Ritz, New York City, February 4, 1988)	3:13
22.	"Say Something" (live at The Ritz, New York City, February 4, 1988)	1:44
23.	"Visions And?" (live at The Ritz, New York City, February 4, 1988)	1:16
24.	"Caring Line" (live at The Ritz, New York City, February 4, 1988)	3:23
25.	"Hole in the Scene" (live at The Ritz, New York City, February 4, 1988)	3:56
26.	"They Know" (live at The Ritz, New York City, February 4, 1988)	1:43
27.	"Where You Live" (live at The Ritz, New York City, February 4, 1988)	3:15

previously unreleased
No.	Title	Length
28.	"Rabbits" (live at The Scorpion, University of Pennsylvania, May 17, 1989)	2:33
29.	"The Land of Me" (live at The Scorpion, University of Pennsylvania, May 17, 1989)	2:59
Total length:		74:45

== Personnel ==
=== Band ===
- John Stabb – lead vocals
- Tom Lyle – guitar, producer (tracks 1–11 and 13–22 on disc 1)
- J. Robbins – bass guitar, lead vocals on "Crash"
- Peter Moffett – drums, mix engineer (tracks 13–22 on disc 1)

=== Production ===
- Jim Fox – recording engineer (tracks 1–11 and 13–22 on disc 1)
- Chris Biondo – additional recording (tracks 1–11 on disc 1)
- Eric L. – mix engineer (tracks 13–22 on disc 1)
- Rob Bowers – recording engineer (tracks 1–13 on disc 2), mix engineer (tracks 28 and 29 on disc 2)
- Jerry Williams – mix engineer (tracks 14–27 on disc 2)
- Doug Johnston – recording engineer for this compilation
- Jeff Caudill – art direction and design
