= Carl Hill =

Carl or Karl Hill may refer to:

- Carl Alexander Gibson-Hill (1911–1963), British physician, naturalist and museum curator
- Carl Fredrik Hill (1849–1911), Swedish painter
- Carl McClellan Hill (1907–1995), African American educator and academic administrator
- Delmas Carl Hill (1906–1989), American judge
- Karl Hill (1831–1893), German baritone opera singer
- Karl Hill (musician) (born 1975), American rock and roll guitarist and drummer, member of Government Issue

== See also ==
- Charles Hill (disambiguation)
- Hill (surname)
