= Edward Twycross =

Edward Twycross (1803–1852) was a Dublin silversmith, solicitor, and writer who in 1847 published a book, "The Mansions of England and Wales," that is used as a historical reference for the stately homes of England and in tracing genealogies of members of the British aristocracy.

== Life ==
=== Early life ===
Twycross was born in Dublin, Ireland, the third son of John Twycross, Dublin goldsmith and jeweler, and Sarah (née Clarke).

=== Career ===
He was admitted to Trinity College, Dublin on 18 October 1819 at the age of 16 and is listed as the son of John, Aurarius (goldsmith), born in Dublin. He graduated in the 1824 Spring commencements with a B.A. Vern, and in 1832 as a Master of Arts. The age links him to Edward's death certificate and the degree to the 1851 Census entry, both found in London, England. In the Admission Papers to King's Inn, Dublin's Inn of Court, is an entry "Twycross, Edward, 3rd son of John, Dublin jeweller and Sarah Clarke. Ed. York Street, Dublin".

Edward's older brother, John (1796–1868) also graduated with a BA from Trinity College, Dublin, in 1818. As did his younger brother Edward he went on to distinguish himself academically, earning an MA and becoming a theologian . In 1861 Christopher Wordsworth published : "A plain introduction to the criticism of the New Testament 1861... in the original Greek: With Notes by C. Wordsworth. With an Index to the Introductions and Notes, by John Twycross [5]. 2 Vols." The Rev. John Twycross, of the Charter House, re-collated the whole manuscript in 1858 . The death of Rev. John Twycross MA Dublin aged 72 is recorded in The Gentleman's magazine, Volume 224 1868 p2

=== Silversmithing ===
Earlier in his life, Edward worked as a silversmith in Dublin, his silver hallmark being " TWY+ ". Edward crafted fine Irish Sterling silver in his father's retail shop in Dublin. John Twycross and Son, Goldsmiths, are listed at 69 Dame Street in Dublin City directories from 1815,1819, 1822, 1824 and 1829. An earlier additional address of the retail business was 14 Fownes Street, Dublin (1806–1818). John Twycross was at one time a Master of the Dublin Goldsmiths Company and became Silversmith to Her Majesty and The Lord Lieutenant. Edward also worked with silversmith Edward Power and they sometimes used the same hallmark. The original building still exists and is the present day location of the Mermaid Cafe close by to Trinity College.

=== Writing ===
Twycross's now rare book was published in 5 volumes covered in quarter morocco gilt, with the volumes being released from 1846 to 1850. They comprise entries on: County of Cornwall, The County Palatine of Lancaster, The County Palatine of Chester

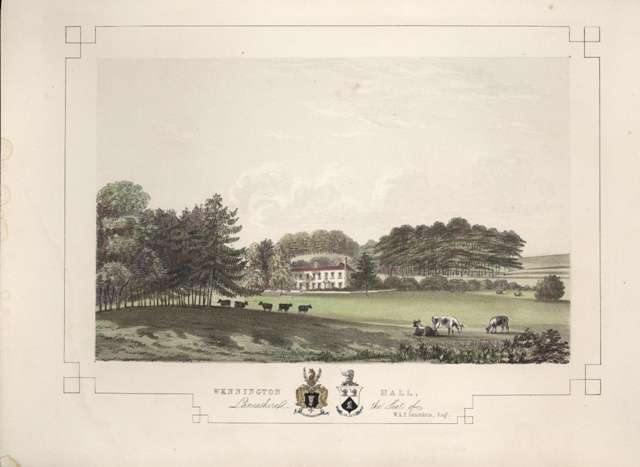

== Contents of volumes ==
The County of Cornwall was published in a separate folio and included a fold out map of the county. Volume 1 : The county palatine of Lancaster, Northern division, the hundreds of Blackburn and Leyland. Volume 2 : The county palatine of Lancaster, Northern division, the hundreds of Lonsdale and Amounderness. Volume 3 : The county palatine of Lancaster, Southern division, the hundreds of West Derby and Salford. Volume 4 : The county palatine of Chester, containing the hundreds of Broxton, Wirrall, Eddisbury, and Northwich. Volume 5 : The county palatine of Chester, containing the hundreds of Nantwich, Bucklow, and Macclesfield.

The volumes are illustrated throughout with 110 tinted lithograph plates of the mansions described in each chapter. These were mostly done by C.J Greenwood from his original drawings.

=== Distribution of Volumes ===
It was thought that Edward intended on publishing volumes on other counties. Only 52 sets of the 5 volume books were printed. The New York Public Library owns a copy that was from the original Astor Library. Some of the volumes have been broken up and single copies of the hand coloured lithographs are sold by dealers. Single volumes occasionally appear at auction houses but they are extremely rare.

Hollinshead Hall, a manor house in Lancashire and Thomas de Trafford, a Lancashire baronet, were subjects included in the book.

Witton House is another example of a manor house that was included in the volumes . It was originally built in 1800 by a member of the Feilden family, Henry. The family had been lords of the manor of Witton for many years and due to years of land acquisition became the largest landowners in Blackburn. The house was described by Edward Twycross in his work, ' The Mansions of England and Wales,' as: ' a very elegant stone edifice in the Grecian style. It is constructed of cream coloured freestone, richly veined, and has in the centre of its eastern front a splendid portico, supported by columns of the Doric order. The principal apartments, which are of noble proportions, are enriched by several paintings by the best modern masters. the situation of the house is particularly fine; it stands on a rising ground in the midst of rich plantations, and commands some splendid views, affording every variety of scenery.
