= Marlboro Music =

German record label

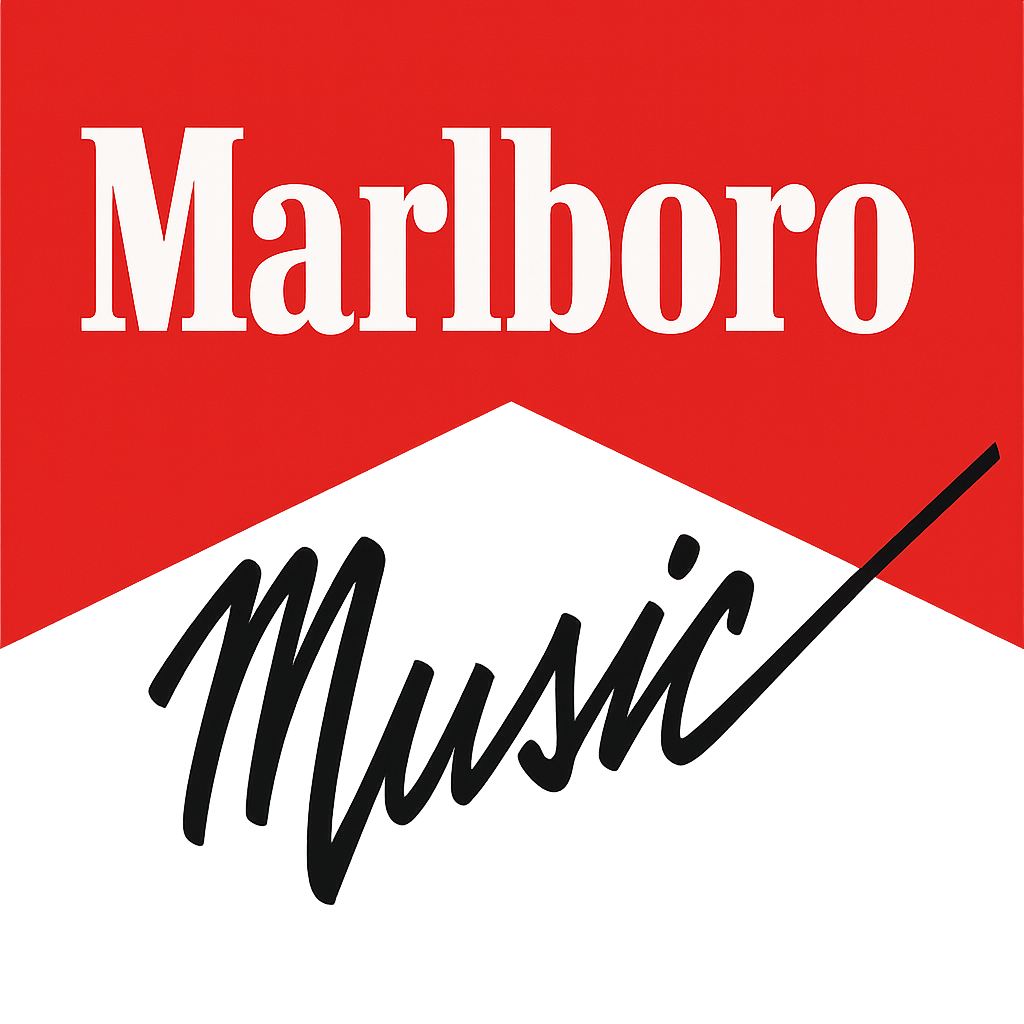
- Parent company: IDE – International Design & Entertainment GmbH
- Founded: 1986
- Founder: Philip Morris GmbH
- Status: Defunct (2000)
- Genre: Various
- Country of origin: Germany
- Location: Munich

Marlboro Music was a German record label based in Munich and active from 1986 to 2000. Operated under IDE – International Design & Entertainment GmbH (a Philip Morris Germany initiative), the imprint issued rock, club/dub, trip-hop, and later euro-dance releases. The label is unrelated to the U.S. Marlboro Music Festival.

== History ==
Marlboro Music was formed in 1986 as part of IDE’s brand-extension projects, which included retail/design and travel ventures. The label was part of Philip Morris's broader strategy to associate the Marlboro brand with youth culture and music. In the early 1990s, the label broadened from German rock/pop into UK-leaning club sounds, dub, and trip-hop. From the mid-1990s, it licensed and promoted several Mo' Wax releases for the German market and later shifted toward euro-dance and trance before ceasing operations around 2000.

== Artists (selection) ==
- DJ Shadow (German editions via Mo’ Wax/Marlboro)
- Pressure Drop
- Franz Benton
- Playhaus
- Godhead
- Sorry About Your Daughter
- Captain Jack
- Mario Lopez
- Basic Connection
- D_Formaz
- Sullen

== Selected discography ==
Early rock/pop

- 1986: Franz Benton – Talking to a Wall (DE) — early Marlboro/IDE issue
- 1986: Franz Benton – "Venice" (7″, DE, promo) — IDE/Marlboro
- 1989: Playhaus – "Want Your Soul Tonight" (7″, DE)

Club / trip-hop (Mo’ Wax era)

- 1992: Pressure Drop – Upset (LP, DE)
- 1992: Pressure Drop – Upset (CD, DE)
- 1996: DJ Shadow – Endtroducing….. (German/European issues via Mo’ Wax/Marlboro)

Rock/alt (mid-1990s)

- 1995: Godhead – Godhead (CD, DE)
- 1995: Sullen – Sapients (CD, DE)
- 1996: Sorry About Your Daughter – Face (CD, DE)
- 1996: Sorry About Your Daughter – "Scapegoat" (CD single, DE)

Euro-dance / trance (late 1990s)

- 1998: Basic Connection feat. Joanne Houchin – "Angel (Don’t Cry)" (CD/12″, DE)
- 1999: Captain Jack – The Captain’s Revenge (CD, DE)
- 1999: D_Formaz – "Stargate" (CD maxi, DE)
- 1999: Mario Lopez – "The Sound of Nature" (CD maxi, DE)

== See also ==
- IDE – International Design & Entertainment GmbH
- Philip Morris International
- Mo' Wax
- Marlboro Music Festival (unrelated U.S. classical festival/label entry on Discogs)
