= Hollinshead Hall =

Manor house in Lancashire, England

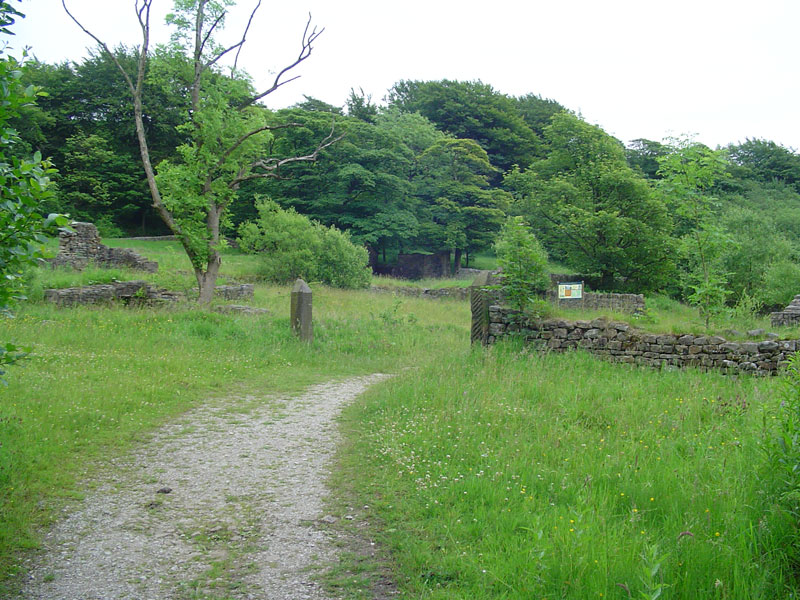
- The ruins of Hollinshead Hall

- Location within Blackburn with Darwen

General information
- Location: Tockholes, Lancashire, England
- Coordinates: 53.6756°N 2.5105°W

Hollinshead Hall was a manor house close to the village of Tockholes, Lancashire. It is unclear whether the hall was originally the manor house of Tockholes, or if Hollinshead was indeed a manor in its own right alongside Tockholes and Livesey. The ruins of the hall are situated approximately 2 miles (3.2 km) south of the village.

The main features of the site consist of the ruins of the late 18th century hall and Gardens, and the associated barn and stables. To the south of here are the remains of the farmhouse and farm buildings, and at the south-east side of the enclosed garden is a well house, the only structure on the site which remains standing today.

== Etymology ==
The name "Hollinshead hall" is presumed to come from the Hollinshead family who are said to have built the hall at some point before the 14th century and from the Manor of Hollinshead itself, however sources to verify this are being awaited. To date the earliest record of Hollinshead hall seems to appear in 1311, although it is probable the hall did indeed exist before then.

One theory suggests that the name Hollinshead hall does not come from a family name at all but rather from a corruption of "Holy Head", an early name given to the manor in the 14th century, which in turn is derived from an earlier unknown Saxon place name given due to the topography and the presence of the noted Spring fed Holy well (A term itself derived from the Anglo-Saxon toponym haeligewielle). The name Tockholes itself is also of Saxon/Viking origin and there is strong archaeological evidence of early settlement.

== History ==
=== Early history ===
The manor has been in the possession of a number of noted Lancashire families.

The earliest record as to the origins of Hollinshead Hall appear in a 14th-century document. It records that in 1311 a John de Radcliffe, a member of the noted Lancashire de Radcliffe family, was owner of “100 Acres in the place called Holinhead, In Tokholes…”.

In 1380 the manor of “le Holyhead In Tokholes” consisted of one messuage, 6 acres (24,000 m^{2}) of arable land, 20 acres (81,000 m^{2}) of meadow and 60 acres (240,000 m^{2}) of pasture.

In 1498 the manor was held by Sir Alexander de Hoghton a member of the Noble Lancashire Hoghton Family of Hoghton Tower.

By 1641 it had technically become the property of Charles I of England before then being rented to an Edward Warren in 1662, who is recorded as paying 2 shillings yearly rent for "The Hollinhead". The hall is presumed to have remained with the Warrens until 1761.

=== 18th & 19th Century ===
In 1761 the hall was passed by George Warren to trustees who then sold the hall to a John Hollinshead. While his family was indeed of an old lineage, being traceable to the reign of Henry III It would appear that the name of the new owner was purely coincidental to it also being the name of the hall itself. According to the 19th century author Edward Twycross, it was John Hollinshead who in 1776 almost entirely pulled down the original hall and remodelled it, the ruins of which can be seen today.

After his death in 1802 John Hollinshead bequeathed his property and title to his cousin William Brock, who became William Brock Hollinshead and who passed the estate to his nephew Laurence Brock Hollinshead of Chorley. The Hall at this time was not occupied by the Brock Hollinsheads but was rented out; in 1803 an Edmund Charnley was tenant at the hall. The hall and title remained the property of Laurence Brock Hollinshead until 1845. The surrounding estate was however sold to a Mr Eccles Shorrock a noted Darwen mill owner in 1838 before the hall itself was then sold to him in 1845.

While the property itself was sold, it appears the name and title continued to be passed along the Brock Hollinshead line. Laurence was to marry three times leaving connections with the Edwards family of Plas Fran near Wrexham, the Potts of Serjeant's Inn, London and the Hampsons (Rev) of Bolton.

== Topography ==
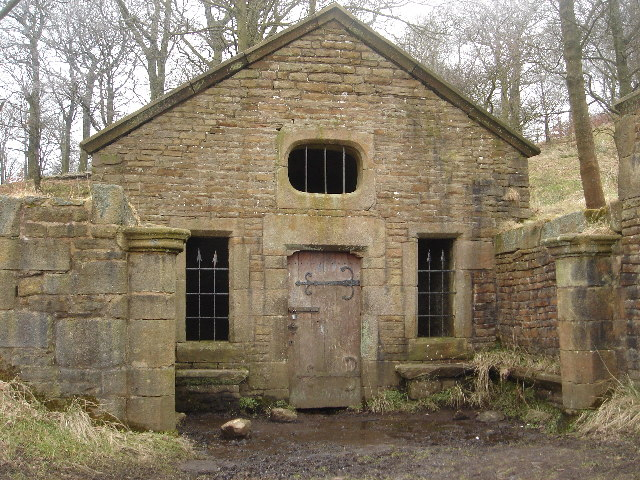
Well House of Hollinshead Hall

Lying 900 ft (270 m) above sea level the hall sits on the eastern slopes of a moorland pass which runs from the Lancashire plains around Bolton North towards Preston. The site occupies a relatively sheltered position in a Westward facing Hollow. Today the site is somewhat protected from wild winds sweeping across the open expanses of the Anglezarke and Darwen Moors by the large Tockholes plantations which now form a part of a United Utilities Water catchment area.

The Hall was originally very extensive but in 1776 John Hollinshead had a large part of the building demolished and proceeded to rebuild on a less grand scale. During the first half of the 19th century, the Hall was owned by the Brock-Hollinsheads, a very old Lancashire family.

In 1845 the Hall was sold to Darwen mill owner Eccles Shorrock, but by the end of the century the buildings had fallen into a state of disrepair and were eventually demolished when the Liverpool Corporation Waterworks acquired the surrounding land for water catchment. Much of the stonework from the hall was used to build walls in the area and also some cottages in Belmont village, two miles (3 km) to the south.

Little now remains, with the exception of the well house, containing a spring feeding two stone troughs.
