= Complete History Volume One =

Compilation album by Government Issue
- Released: March 28, 2000
- Recorded: 1982–1985
- Genre: Hardcore punk
- Length: 140:46
- Label: Dr. Strange
- Producer: Brian Baker, Tom Lyle, Ian MacKaye, Government Issue, Tom Scott

Government Issue chronology
The Mystic Years (1995)	Complete History Volume One (2000)	Complete History Volume Two (2002)

Complete History Volume One is a compilation album by the Washington, D.C. hardcore punk band Government Issue, compiling the band's recordings from 1982 to 1985. It was released March 28, 2000 through Dr. Strange Records, with a companion album, Complete History Volume Two, released in 2002. Together, the two Complete History albums collect nearly all of the band's recorded output. Volume One intentionally omits the 1981 Legless Bull EP and the tracks "Hey Ronnie" and "Lie, Cheat, and Steal" released on the Flex Your Head compilation, as both of these releases are still in print through Dischord Records.

== Track listing ==
All songs written and composed by Government Issue, except where noted.

=== Disc 1 ===
Make an Effort, 1982
No.	Title	Length
1.	"Teenager in a Box"	1:28
2.	"No Way Out"	1:47
3.	"Twisted Views"	1:23
4.	"Sheer Terror"	2:16

From Underground Hits Volume 2, 1982
No.	Title	Length
5.	"G.I."	0:44

Boycott Stabb, 1983
No.	Title	Length
6.	"Hall of Fame"	1:01
7.	"Hour of 1"	1:17
8.	"G.I."	0:39
9.	"Puppet on a String"	1:10
10.	"Sheer Terror"	3:31
11.	"Happy People"	1:12
12.	"Lost in Limbo"	0:36
13.	"Plain to See"	1:47
14.	"Partyline"	1:13
15.	"Here's the Rope"	2:11
16.	"Insomniac"	1:02

From Flipside Vinyl Fanzine Vol. 1, 1983
No.	Title	Length
17.	"Religious Ripoff"	1:18

Boycott Stabb CD bonus tracks
No.	Title	Length
18.	"Sheer Terror" (live at the University of Maryland, October 1, 1982)	2:20
19.	"G.I." (live at the University of Maryland, October 1, 1982)	0:47
20.	"Happy People" (live at the University of Maryland, October 1, 1982)	0:58
21.	"No Rights" (live at the University of Maryland, October 1, 1982)	0:49

Flex magazine single, 1983
No.	Title	Length
22.	"Puppet on a String" (live at Space II Arcade in Washington, D.C., September 1983)	1:22

Joyride, 1984
No.	Title	Length
23.	"Blending In"	1:27
24.	"Understand"	1:52
25.	"4-Wall Hermit"	1:16
26.	"Familiar"	2:13
27.	"Time to Escape"	1:46
28.	"Hey Ronnie" (live)	1:19
29.	"Joy Ride"	1:39
30.	"Hall of Fame"	1:26
31.	"Notch to My Crotch"	1:11
32.	"Reflection"	1:14
33.	"These Boots Are Made for Walkin'" (Lee Hazlewood; originally performed by Nancy Sinatra)	2:18
34.	"Puppet on a String" (live)	1:17
35.	"Sheer Terror"	1:14

The Fun Just Never Ends, 1985
No.	Title	Length
36.	"Fun & Games"	1:03
37.	"Written Word"	2:14
38.	"Mad at Myself"	2:02
39.	"The Next Time"	2:07
40.	"Bored to Death"	1:29
41.	"Vanity Fare"	2:26
42.	"World Caved In"	2:48
43.	"Massacre"	1:40
44.	"Trapped" (written and originally performed by The Faith)	1:27
45.	"Vanity Fare" (live)	2:24

=== Disc 2 ===
Give Us Stabb or Give Us Death, 1985
No.	Title	Length
1.	"Plain to See"	2:21
2.	"Written Word"	2:08
3.	"The Next Time"	2:10
4.	"Blending In" (live at the CE Center in Philadelphia, February 23, 1985)	1:34
5.	"Day of Reckoning" (Bobby Liebling)	1:52

Live!, 1985
No.	Title	Length
6.	"Interview" (with WCVT in Baltimore, 1981)	2:08
7.	"Familiar" (live at King Kong's in Adelphi, Maryland, June 21, 1984)	2:17
8.	"Time to Escape" (live at King Kong's in Adelphi, Maryland, June 21, 1984)	1:47
9.	"The Next Time" (live at the CE Center in Philadelphia, February 23, 1985)	2:12
10.	"Fun & Games" (live at the CE Center in Philadelphia, February 23, 1985)	1:03
11.	"These Boots Are Made for Walkin'" (live at the Newton Theater in Washington, D.C., June 24, 1984; written by Lee Hazlewood, originally performed by Nancy Sinatra)	3:00
12.	"Hall of Fame" (live at the Upper Deck in Minneapolis, August 3, 1983)	1:14
13.	"Reflection" (live at Pierce Hall in Washington, D.C., April 6, 1984)	1:19
14.	"Notch to My Crotch" (live at Pierce Hall in Washington, D.C., April 6, 1984)	1:35
15.	"Interview 2" (with WMUC-FM at the University of Maryland, 1981)	1:35
16.	"Hall of Fame II" (live at King Kong's in Adelphi, Maryland, June 21, 1984)	1:22
17.	"Teenager in a Box" (live at Glenmont Recreation Center in Wheaton, Maryland, February 5, 1984)	1:58
18.	"Understand" (live at the CE Center in Philadelphia, February 23, 1985)	1:55
19.	"G.I." (live at the Wilson Center in Washington, D.C., February 25, 1983)	0:44
20.	"Hour of 1" (live at the Wilson Center in Washington, D.C., October 22, 1982)	1:25
21.	"Dead Dog" (live at CBGB in New York City, July 30, 1983)	3:37
22.	"Any Final Comments?" (interview excerpt with WCVT in Baltimore, 1981)	0:22

Government Issue, 1986
No.	Title	Length
23.	"Visions And?"	1:32
24.	"They Know"	1:43
25.	"Locked Inside"	2:39
26.	"Even When You're Here"	3:41
27.	"Everybody's Victim"	2:49
28.	"Memories Past"	1:13
29.	"When I'm Alone"	2:00
30.	"Hear the Scream"	2:25
31.	"Say Something"	2:16
32.	"On the Screen"	1:56
33.	"It Begins Now"	2:38
34.	"Last Forever"	2:56
35.	"Sheer Terror"	2:39

== Personnel ==
=== Band ===
- John Stabb – lead vocals (all tracks)
- Marc Alberstadt – drums (all tracks)
- Tom Lyle – bass guitar (tracks 1–5 on disc 1), guitar (tracks 6–45 on disc 1), producer (tracks 1–5 and 23–35 on disc 1, tracks 23–35 on disc 2)
- Brian Baker – guitar (tracks 1–5 on disc 1), producer (tracks 1–5 and 23–45 on disc 1, tracks 1–5 and 23–35 on disc 2)
- Mitch Parker – bass guitar (tracks 6–22 on disc 1)
- Mike Fellows – bass guitar (tracks 23–35 on disc 1, tracks 13, 14, and 17 on disc 2)
- Lenny Leonard – bass guitar (tracks 36–45 on disc 1, tracks 1–5, 7–11, 16, 18, 23, 25–32, 34, and 35 on disc 2)
- Rob Moss – bass guitar (tracks 12 and 21 on disc 2)
- Mitch Parker – bass guitar (tracks 19 and 20 on disc 2)
- Steve Hansgen – bass guitar (tracks 24 and 33 on disc 2)

=== Production ===
- Tom Scott – recording engineer (all tracks on disc 1, tracks 1–5 on disc 2), producer (tracks 23–35 on disc 1), remix engineer (tracks 36–45 on disc 1, tracks 1–5 on disc 2)
- Ian MacKaye – producer and backing vocals (tracks 6–17 on disc 1)
- Don Zientara – recording engineer (tracks 6–17 on disc 1)
- Barbara Milne – recording engineer (tracks 36–45 on disc 1, tracks 1–5 on disc 2)
- Steve Carr – recording engineer (tracks 36–45 on disc 1, tracks 1–5 on disc 2)
- Jim Fox – recording engineer (tracks 23–35 on disc 2)
- Phillip Roves – recording engineer (tracks 23–35 on disc 2)
- Chris Biondo – recording and remix engineer (tracks 23–35 on disc 2)
- Doug Johnston – recording engineer for this compilation
- Jeff Caudill – art direction and design
