= Tockholes =

Village in Lancashire, England

Coordinates: 53.706°N 2.508°W

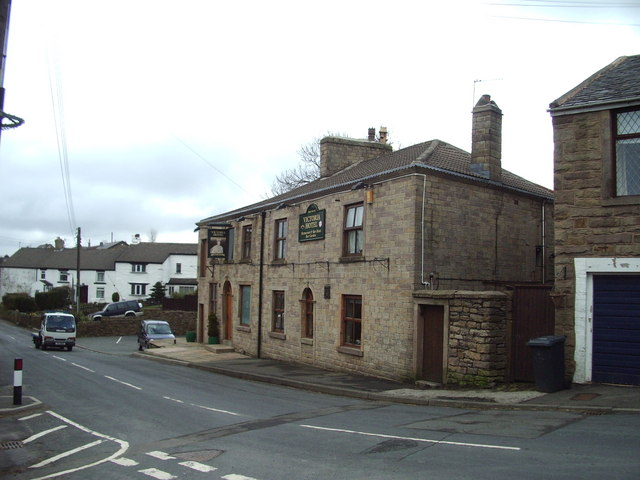
- Tockholes village

- Shown within Blackburn with Darwen Location within Lancashire
- Population: 478 (2011)
- OS grid reference: SD665235
- Civil parish: Tockholes
- Unitary authority: Blackburn with Darwen
- Ceremonial county: Lancashire
- Region: North West
- Country: England
- Sovereign state: United Kingdom
- Post town: DARWEN
- Postcode district: BB3
- Dialling code: 01254
- Police: Lancashire
- Fire: Lancashire
- Ambulance: North West
- UK Parliament: Blackburn

Tockholes is a village and civil parish which forms part of the Blackburn with Darwen unitary authority in the English county of Lancashire, England. Tockholes consists of the village of Tockholes itself and the hamlet of Ryal Fold, and has a population of 454, increasing to 478 at the 2011 Census. It lies on the West Pennine Moors and is surrounded by the towns of Blackburn to the north and Darwen to the east and by the villages of Belmont to the south and Withnell to the west. Darwen Tower is a prominent local landmark that lies to the east of Tockholes and the Roddlesworth Reservoirs and Tockholes forest plantation lie to the south with the M65 passing to the north. There are two churches: Tockholes United Reformed Church and Saint Stephen's Church.

== History ==
=== Early settlement ===
Archaeological records for the area in and around Tockholes reveal the presence of Tribal communities as early as 2,000BC. The area is thought to have been inhabited by both Celtic and Anglo-Saxon settlers. Artifacts found in the area to support early settlement include a stone axe head, bronze spear head and later coins. There is a strong connection with early settlers nearby with Bronze Age barrows, stone circles, settlements and a variety of objects all being found over the surrounding countryside. Despite running close to an ancient Roman route between Preston and Bolton, There is little evidence of any Roman settlement at Tockholes.

=== 13th & 14th centuries ===
In the first half of the 13th century Tockholes was found to be held in thegnage by a local family of the name of Pleasington for a yearly service of 2s. The manor was split in half between Robert de Pleasington and Elias de Pleasington. The manor was subsequently held in demesne by a Joice de Tockholes and a Geoffrey de Sutton. In around 1250 Joice de Tockholes released his tenement to His Lord Elias de Pleasington and at some point during the early reign of Edward I, A William de Livesey was mesne tenant here and was granted the feudal rights and services due from Geoffrey de Sutton.

In 1314–15 the son of John de Pleasington, Robert conveyed his land to William de Holand and in 1332 he granted the manor of Tockholes in fee to Robert de Radcliffe.

==== Civil War ====
In 1833 a large pit was discovered in Tockholes located in a field with the official title of "Pit Field", this field had previously been known locally as "Kill Field". In the pit were found the remains of some forty horses along with Cannonballs, Clubs and Large Buttons.

At some point during the Civil War, either during the course of the Earl of Derby's movements between Preston, Bolton, and Blackburn in 1643, or in 1644 with the passage of Prince Rupert's army, severe fighting took place about the lower part of Tockholes, in the vicinity of the church and then on to Cartridge-hill and Hollinshead Hall. Several cannonballs have been picked up in other parts of Tockholes, One was found in a field just above the Bethesda Chapel and another was found on Cartridge-hill, a lofty fell a mile or so further to the south above Hollinshead Hall. Musket bullets have also been found in a field behind the Old Independent Chapel only a short distance from the "Kill Field" Pit. The artifacts recovered in Tockholes seem to indicate a severe battle in which troops, horses and musketeers were engaged and in which at least one piece of ordnance was brought into use by one side or the other. A battle in which at least forty horses were killed must have been quite a fierce one for such a small village.

As the pit was found so close to the old Church of Tockholes, it is supposed that the bodies of the soldiers killed in the Battle would have been removed and buried in consecrated ground, their weapons and items of value being claimed by the prevailing side.

=== 20th Century to present ===
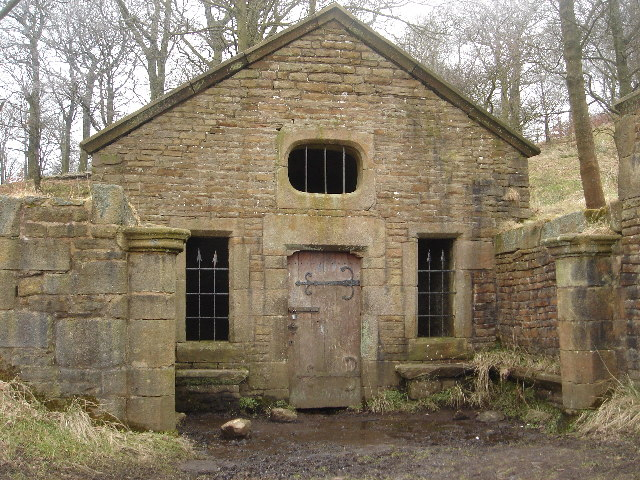
Ruined Well House of Hollinshead Hall

Approximately two miles to the south are the ruins of Hollinshead Hall, the former Tockholes manor house and what may be an older Manor house can be found on the road from the centre of the village known as Top o't Low past Victoria Terrace and the Bethesda Chapel towards Abbey Village. This Manor house was still occupied during the 1930s though not by the original family.

Tockholes itself has quite a lot of history. During the time of the religious purges it was a centre for nonconformist followers to come to worship. The Chapel situated at the bottom of Long Lane was one of the earliest Congregational Chapels in Lancashire though not in the present building. When slavery was still practised in England, I believe one of the local farmers went to Liverpool and bought a slave to work on his farm but the villagers objected so strongly at this that he was made to declare him a free man and pay him his due wages. The row of cottages in Silk Hall fold were built during the 17th century to accommodate silk weavers and the old weaving rooms are situated in the rooms at the top of the stone staircase the roof windows are still to be seen.

Tockholes was also host to the 'Live the Dream' rave that took place on 16 September 1989; that was a big turning point in house/techno culture.

== Notable people ==
Among the notable people born in Tockholes is Charles Hill (1816–1889) who became an industrialist in Sweden.

== See also ==
- Listed buildings in Tockholes
