= Listed buildings in Tockholes =

Tockholes is a civil parish in Blackburn with Darwen, Lancashire, England. It contains 26 buildings that are recorded in the National Heritage List for England as designated listed buildings. Of these, three are listed at Grade II*, the middle grade, and the others are at Grade II, the lowest grade. Apart from the village of Tockholes, the parish is rural. The great majority of the listed buildings are farmhouses and associated farm buildings. Three of the other listed buildings are associated with the parish church, namely a sundial, a former school, and a lychgate, and the last is a structure over a well or spring in the grounds of the now-demolished Hollinshead Hall.

== Key ==
Grade	Criteria
II*	Particularly important buildings of more than special interest
II	Buildings of national importance and special interest

== Buildings ==
Name and location	Photograph	Date	Notes	Grade
Higher Whitehalgh Farmhouse; 53.71184°N 2.52792°W	—	1616	A sandstone farmhouse with a roof of slate and stone-slate in two storeys with a four-bay front. On the front is two-storey gabled porch with a datestone and a finial. The windows are mullioned. On the rear is a projecting single-story two-bay dairy and a garderobe shute. Inside the farmhouse is an inglenook and a bressumer.	II
Lower Hill; 53.70125°N 2.52228°W		Early 17th century (probable)	A large farmhouse, later divided into four houses, it is in sandstone with roofs of slate and stone-slate. It has an F-shaped plan, consisting of a hall and a cross-wing, and is in two and 2 1/2 storeys with a three-bay front. The gabled porch is between the first and second bays, and the windows are mullioned. Inside the hall is a large inglenook, within the porch is a stone staircase, and the upper rooms have flagged floors.	II*
Red Lee Farmhouse; 53.70040°N 2.53583°W	—	Early 17th century (probable)	A sandstone farmhouse with a stone-slate roof and an attached shippon. It has two storeys and two bays, the first bay protruding on the left, and the shippon protruding on the right. The windows are mullioned, and at the rear is an outshut.	II
Barn, Higher Whitehalgh Farm; 53.71207°N 2.52817°W		17th century (probable)	The barn is in sandstone with a stone-slate roof. It has six bays, with added coach houses to the front of the right three bays. There is also a lean-to cowshed at the rear. The coach houses have large lintels, one of which is 7 metres (23 ft) long, but cracked. At the right end of the barn are two stables.	II
Higher Crow Trees; 53.70287°N 2.52513°W	—	17th century	A sandstone farmhouse, later converted into a house, it has a slate roof, two storeys, and a four-bay front. The first bay projects slightly forward, and contains a lintel and modern windows. The fourth bay has been reduced to a single storey lean-to and contains a chamfered doorway and a lancet window. The centre two bays have a doorway and mullioned windows. At the rear is a long extension and a six-light mullioned window.	II
Higher Hill Farmhouse; 53.69860°N 2.51998°W		17th century	A large farmhouse with an F-shaped plan, in sandstone with stone-slate roofs, and with 2 1/2 storeys. It has a three-bay front, the first bay forming a projecting gabled wing. Between the second and third bays is a projecting two-storey gabled porch with a segmental-headed doorway, above which is a datestone, a three-light window, and a round-headed window in the gable. Most of the windows are mullioned, and some have been replaced by sashes. On the right side is a projecting first-floor garderobe.	II*
Lodge Farmhouse and barn 53.70356°N 2.51960°W	—	17th century	The farmhouse with integrated barn is in sandstone with roofs in slate and stone-slate. Additions were made at the left end in the 18th and 19th centuries resulting in roofs of three different heights. The house is now in three bays with a lean-to porch. The barn also has three bays and contains a wagon entrance, a doorway, and ventilation slots.	II
Lower Crow Trees; 53.70349°N 2.52571°W	—	17th century	Originally a farmhouse, later converted into a house, it is in sandstone with a slate roof. The house has an L-shaped plan, with two storeys and two bays, the first bay having a projecting gabled wing containing a moulded doorway. At the rear is a modern lean-to extension. The windows in the front of the house are mullioned, the other walls having altered openings.	II
Ryal Farmhouse; 53.69070°N 2.50718°W		17th century	A large farmhouse with an F-shaped plan, in sandstone with tiled roofs, and with two storeys. It has a three-bay front, the first bay forming a projecting gabled wing. Between the second and third bays is a projecting two-storey gabled porch containing a round-headed doorway with rusticated voussoirs. To the left of the porch, and in front of the first bay is an outshut. The windows are mullioned.	II*
Chapels Farmhouse; 53.70572°N 2.51762°W	—	Late 17th century (probable)	A sandstone farmhouse with a slate roof in two storeys with a three-bay front, the left bay having been added in the 18th century. At the rear is a two-storey extension, probably also added in the 18th century. The windows are mullioned.	II
Barn, Higher Crow Trees; 53.70306°N 2.52555°W	—	Late 17th century (probable)	A sandstone barn with stone-slate roofs in three bays. The central bay contains a wagon entrance with a canopy, and in the other bays there are ventilation holes.	II
Barn, Higher Hill Farm (north); 53.69884°N 2.51983°W	—	Late 17th century (probable)	The barn, later extended, is in sandstone with a stone-slate roof. It has four bays, with an extension on the left. The barn contains a blocked doorway with a large lintel, wagon entrances with canopies, and ventilation holes.	II
Barn, Higher Hill Farm (west); 53.69871°N 2.52024°W	—	Late 17th century (probable)	A sandstone barn with a stone-slate roof and gable coping. It has four bays, with a wagon entrance in the second bay, and doorways at the left end. Later additions have been made to the front.	II
Barn, Higher Red Lee Farm; 53.70020°N 2.53529°W	—	Late 17th century (probable)	The barn, with a stable set back at the right end, is in sandstone with a stone-slate roof. It has three bays, and contains a wagon entrance, and ventilation holes. Above the stable is a loft, and at the rear is a continuous lean-to cowshed.	II
Barn, Lower Crow Trees; 53.70316°N 2.52568°W	—	1671	The sandstone barn has a corrugated asbestos roof, and is in three bays, with an additional bay on the right. There is a wagon entrance with a short porch, a plain doorway with a large lintel above which is a datestone, and a later lean-to extension.	II
Higher Red Lee Farmhouse; 53.70031°N 2.53502°W	—	1674	A former sandstone farmhouse with a stone-slate roof in 2 1/2 storeys and three bays. It has a full-height gabled porch with a datestone above the inner doorway, and containing a stone staircase. Most of the windows have lost their mullions. Inside the house is an inglenook and bressumer, some wattle and daub, and a timber-framed partition in the upper floor.	II
Barn, Lower Hill Farm (south); 53.70102°N 2.52242°W	—	c. 1700 (probable)	The barn is in sandstone with a stone-slate roof and is in three bays. In front of the first and second bays is a large lean-to extension. Outside the third bay stone steps lead up to a loft, and there is a mullioned window in the upper storey. At the right end is a doorway, two windows, ventilation holes, and a first-floor opening.	II
Barn, Lower Hill Farm (southwest); 53.70089°N 2.52276°W	—	c. 1700 (probable)	A sandstone barn with a stone-slate roof in four bays. It contains a plain door, a wagon opening with a canopy, a large rectangular opening, and ventilation holes. At the rear is a lean-to extension.	II
Barn, Chapels Farm; 53.70555°N 2.51797°W	—	Early 18th century (probable)	The barn, later converted into a house, is in sandstone with a stone-slate roof. It has an L-shaped plan with four bays, the third and fourth bays projecting forward. In front of the first and second bays is a lean-to extension, and in the third bay is a wagon entrance. There is an owl hole in the gable on the right side.	II
Well House; 53.67464°N 2.51057°W		18th century (probable)	A sandstone building with a stone-slate roof over a well in the grounds of the former Hollinshead Hall. The entrance front has a doorway flanked by flat-headed windows and with an oval window above in the gable. Inside is a vaulted roof with a pendant, stone side-benches, a central gutter, and a stone tank. Beyond this is a reredos with Ionic colonnettes flanking an alcove with a carved lion's head and paws.	II
Fine Peter's Farmhouse; 53.69557°N 2.51150°W	—	1757	A farmhouse and attached barn in sandstone with stone-slate roofs, in an L-shaped plan, and with gables facing the road. On the front is a semicircular projecting porch with Tuscan pilasters. Above this is a datestone, there are windows flanking the porch, one window in the upper storey, and a circular window in the gable.	II
The Manse and Silk Hall Farmhouse; 53.70323°N 2.51397°W		1764	Originally one house called Silk Hall, later divided into two dwellings. It is in sandstone with a roof partly in stone-slates and partly felted. The building has three bays and three storeys, the top floor originally being a workshop. On the front is a three-storey gabled porch containing a doorway with a large inscribed lintel. The windows are mostly altered. On the left side is a flight of stone steps leading to a door in the top floor.	II
Barn, Ryal Farm; 53.69054°N 2.50744°W	—	1771	The sandstone barn has a corrugated steel roof and is in five bays. In the centre is a wagon entrance, with three windows to the left and a doorway with a large lintel and an inscribed datestone to the right.	II
Sundial; 53.70581°N 2.51678°W	—	Early 19th century (probable)	The sundial is in St Stephen's churchyard. It is in sandstone and consists of a pedestal of four clustered colonnettes on an octagonal base with a circular table. The plate and gnomon are missing. An inscription on the base shows that it was sculpted by G. Thornber.	II
St Stephen's Old School; 53.70588°N 2.51670°W		1834	A simple rectangular sandstone building with a slate roof in St Stephen's churchyard. It has a plain doorway with a mullioned window to the left. To the right is an arched doorway containing a stone pulpit on a pedestal, and to the right of this is an inscribed plaque.	II
Lychgate, St Stephen's Churchyard; 53.70572°N 2.51689°W		1906	The lychgate is in sandstone with a stone-slate roof and is in medieval style. It has a square plan consisting of an archway flanked by gabled buttresses, and at the top is moulded coping. There are inscriptions on the front and on the back.	II
