= International Design & Entertainment GmbH =

IDE – International Design & Entertainment GmbH
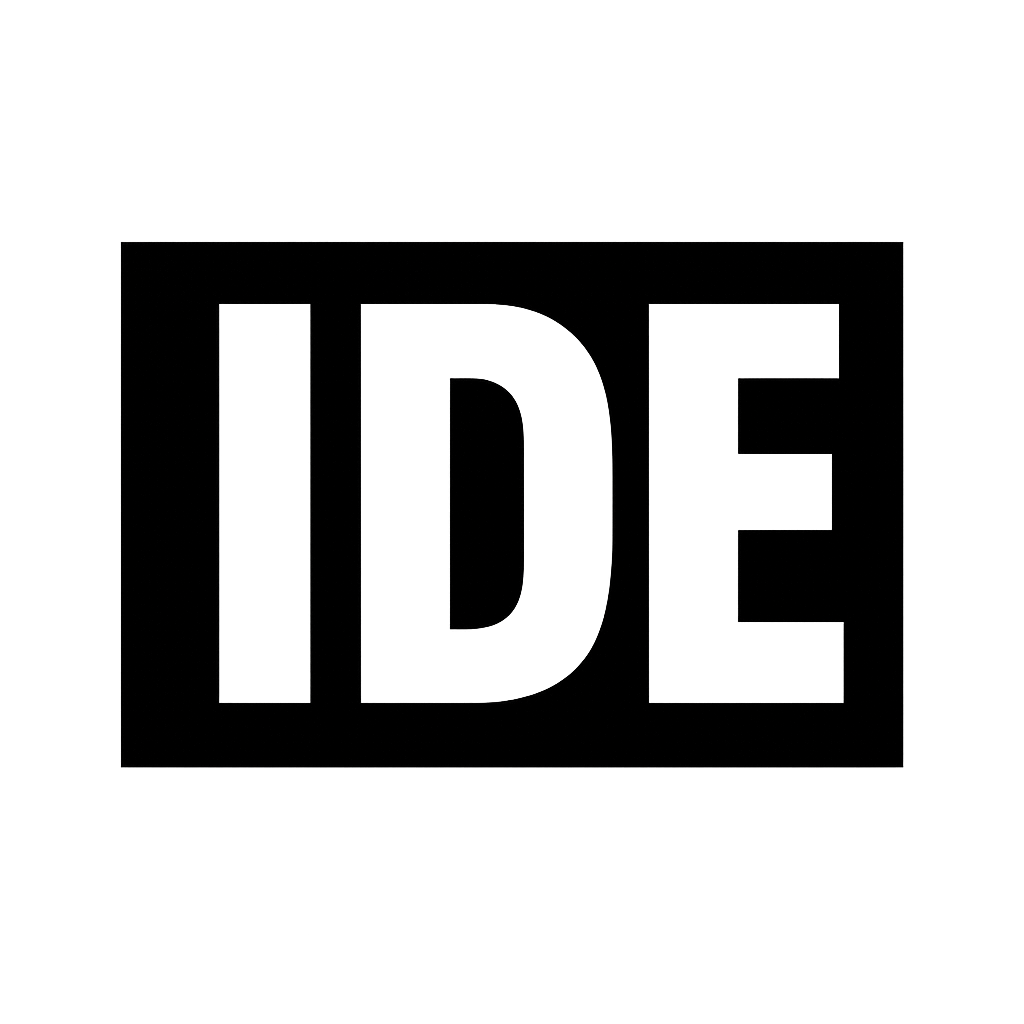
- Type: Subsidiary
- Industry: Marketing; design; entertainment
- Founded: 1986
- Founder: Philip Morris GmbH; initiative led by Knut Föckler
- Headquarters: Munich, Germany
- Parent: Philip Morris GmbH

IDE – International Design & Entertainment GmbH (IDE) was a Munich-based brand-extension company created by Philip Morris Germany in 1986. Set up under marketing director Knut Föckler, IDE developed lifestyle and entertainment ventures associated with the Marlboro brand, including the Marlboro Music record label, Marlboro Reisen (Marlboro Travel), and the Marlboro/Philip Morris Design Shop retail/catalog program.

== Activities ==
IDE acted as the corporate parent for the German label Marlboro Music and related sublabels; Discogs lists IDE as parent to Marlboro Music and other imprints. Contemporary accounts of the initiative describe a broader diversification into travel services (Marlboro Reisen) and branded retail/design catalogs (Marlboro Design Shop).

== See also ==
- Marlboro Music
- Philip Morris International
