= Charles Hill (industrialist) =

Swedish industrialist of English origin

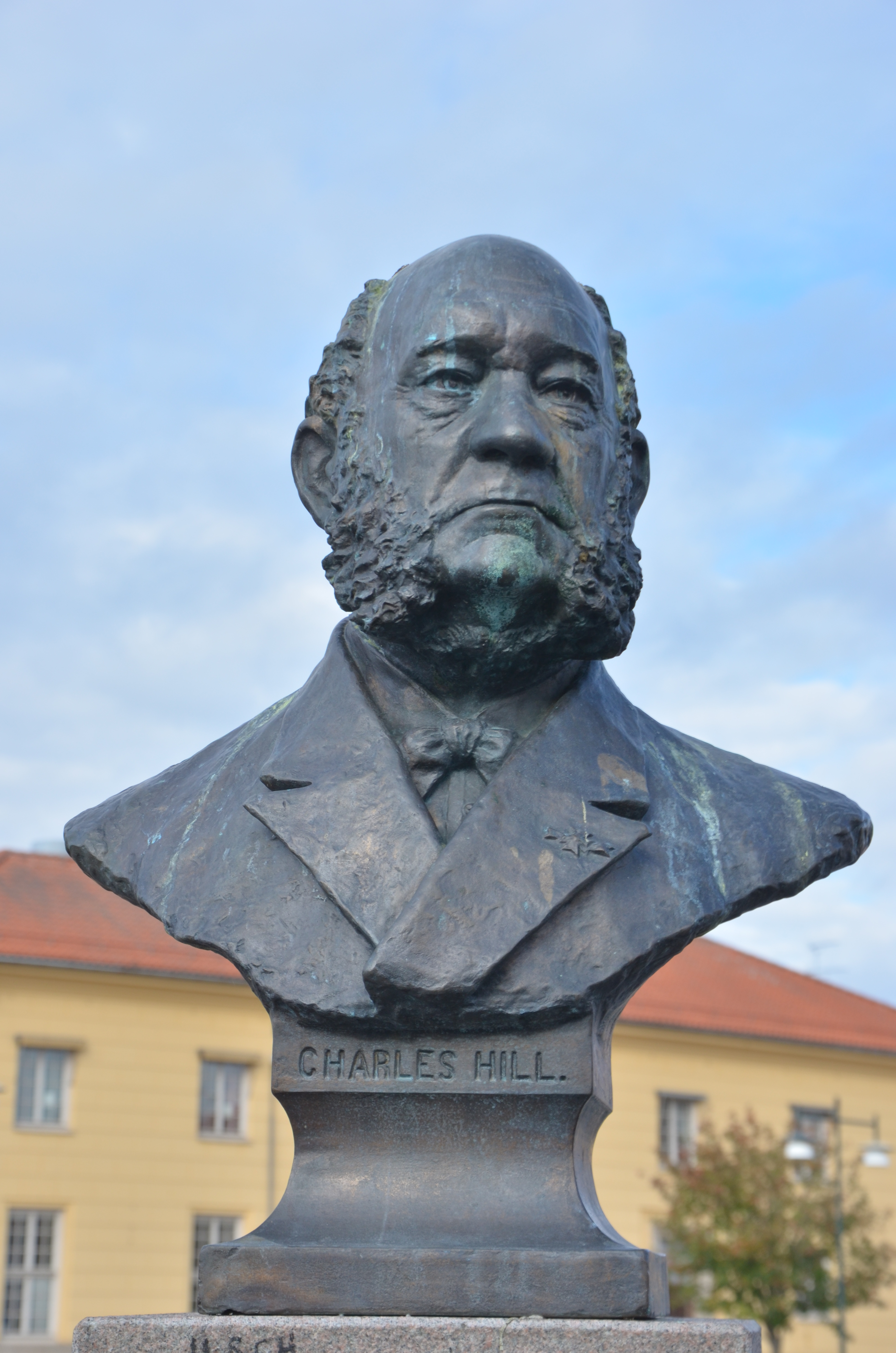
- Bust of Charles Hill, unveiled in Alingsås in 2005.
- Born: June 26, 1816; Tockholes, Lancashire, England
- Died: April 28, 1889 (aged 72); Gothenburg, Sweden
- Occupation: Industrialist

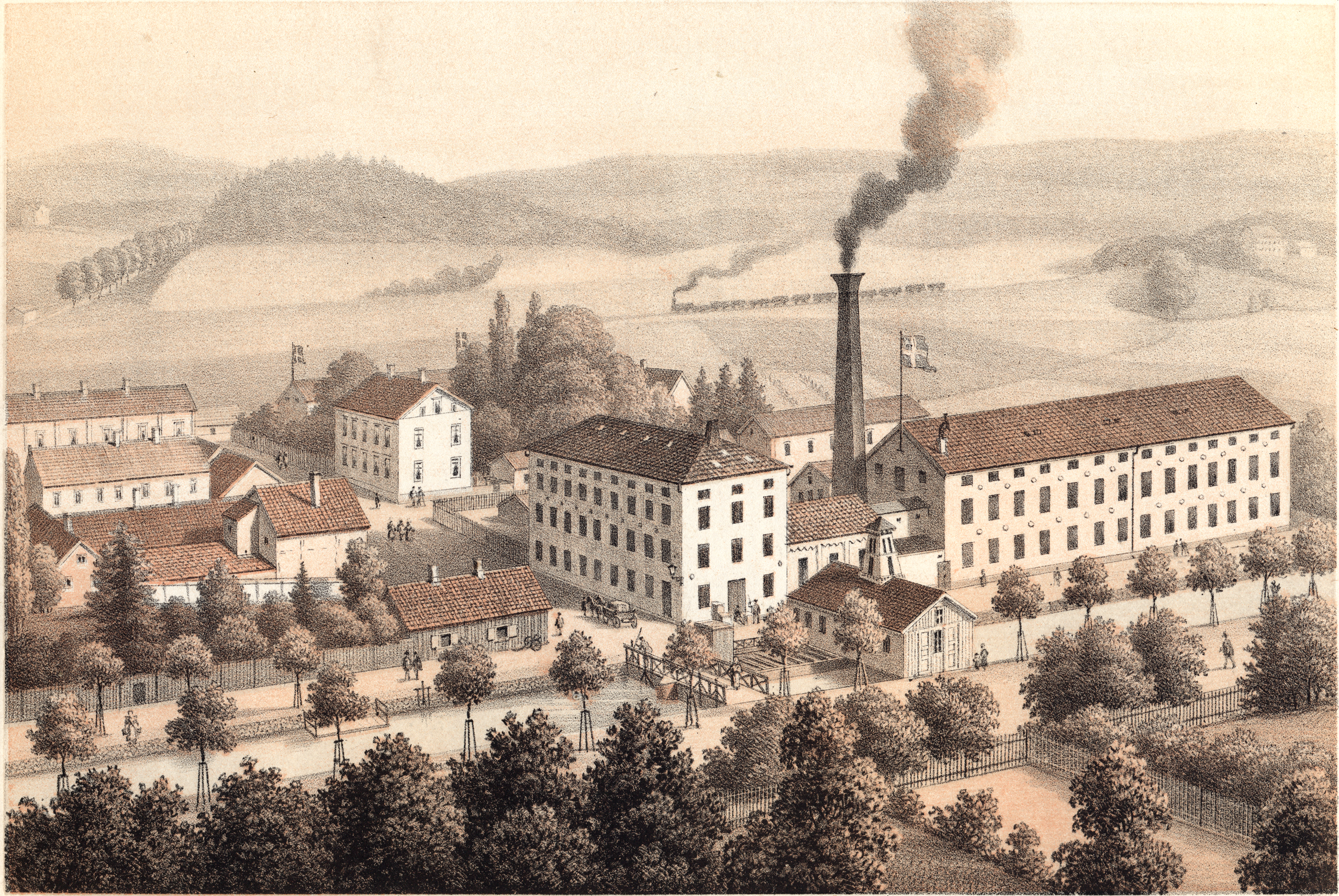
Alingsås bomullsväveri (Alingsås Cotton Mill) founded by Charles Hill in 1862.

Charles Hill (June 26, 1816 – April 28, 1889) was a Swedish industrialist of English origin.

== Life and career ==
Hill was born in Tockholes, Lancashire, England. His father died when Charles was barely ten years old and the family moved to Bolton, where Charles was employed at a cotton mill. He acquired a solid technical knowledge of the industry, and at the age of 20 he had become an overlooker.

In 1843 Hill left England with his family, for employment at a cotton mill at Rydboholm, Älvsborg County, Sweden. The factory was the first mechanical cotton mill in Sweden and the company faced a shortage of competent workers. Hill was recruited following a recommendation from a compatriot who already worked at the factory. At Rydboholm, Hill was soon given responsibility for the factory's entire production.

In 1852 Hill was invited to participate in the foundation of a completely new cotton mill in Norrköping, Östergötland County. His technical know-how and contacts were a prerequisite for making the necessary purchases of machinery in England and being able to start the production. He left his employment at Rydboholm to become factory manager in Norrköping. The cotton mill in Norrköping was to be run as a limited company and the shareholders were required to be Swedish citizens. Hill therefore applied for and was granted Swedish citizenship in 1852. The production in Norrköping began in 1853 and five years later it had overtaken that of Rydboholm, which until then had been Sweden's leading cotton mill.

In 1857 Hill also became a partner in Wiskaholm Cotton Mill in Borås, Älvsborg County. However, the American Civil War led to a reduced supply of cotton, which caused the company to go bankrupt in 1863.

In 1862 Charles Hill founded his own cotton mill in the town of Alingsås, Älvsborg County. The company gradually expanded and became the largest employer in Alingsås.

In 1880 Hill acquired Rosenlund Cotton Mill in Gothenburg but sold the factory to his son Edmund Hill in 1882.

During his time in Alingsås, Charles Hill took the initiative to build a municipal gasworks and install street lights. He also took the initiative to build the first hotel in the town. Hill had several municipal assignments, including as a member of the executive committee of the town.

Charles Hill died in Gothenburg in 1889.

=== Honours ===
1870: Knight of the Royal Order of Vasa
