= John Stabb (musician) =

American punk-rock vocalist (1961–2016)

- Also known as: Stabb
- Born: John Dukes Schroeder; July 12, 1961; Washington, D.C., U.S.
- Died: May 7, 2016 (aged 54) Rockville, Maryland, U.S.
- Genres: Hardcore punk, punk rock, alternative rock, post-hardcore
- Occupations: Musician, singer, actor, writer
- Instrument: Vocals
- Years active: 1979–2016
- Labels: Dischord; Semblance; DSI Records; Tragic Life; Diesel Boy; Postfact; Rusty Knuckles; Morphius
- Formerly of: Government Issue; The Factory Incident
- Website: johnstabb.com

John Dukes Schroeder (July 12, 1961 – May 7, 2016), known professionally as John Stabb, was an American punk rock vocalist, best known as the founding frontman of the hardcore punk band Government Issue. Active from the late 1970s until his death in 2016, Stabb also performed with numerous other bands including The Factory Incident, Weatherhead, Stabb, Emma Peel, Betty Blue, Stain, and History Repeated.

Stabb was born in Washington, D.C., and raised in Rockville, Maryland, where he attended Colonel Zadok A. Magruder High School. In addition to his music career, he occasionally acted and was a freelance writer for Washington City Paper and Forced Exposure.

== Personal life ==
Stabb married his longtime partner Mina Devadas on St. Patrick’s Day 2016 while hospitalized at Holy Cross Hospital (Silver Spring). After a 112-day battle with stomach cancer, he died at a hospice in Rockville, Maryland on May 7, 2016, at the age of 54.

== Legacy and influence ==
Stabb was known for his energetic stage presence and distinctive personality, which helped define the sound and identity of Government Issue and the Washington, D.C. hardcore punk scene. In a 2015 interview, he remarked, "I was the only one who could stand myself," reflecting the humor and self-awareness that endeared him to fans and fellow musicians.

== Works outside of music ==
=== Filmography ===
Stabb appeared in Salad Days, a documentary about the D.C. punk scene. He also participated in independent films such as Blood and Steel and performed at Cedar Crest Country Club events.

=== Writing ===
Stabb contributed music commentary and articles to Washington City Paper and Forced Exposure.

== Discography (non-Government Issue) ==
Date	Artist	Release	Label	Comments
1989	Glee Club	’’Glee Club’’	Semblance	Vinyl, 12", 33 ⅓ RPM
1992	John Stabb	"The Total Experience"	DSI Records	Cass, Album
1993	Emma Peel	"Avenging Punk Rock Godfathers"	Tragic Life	7"
1996	Betty Blue	"Men In Belted Sweaters"	Diesel Boy	CD, Album
2001	The Factory Incident	"Helmshore"	Postfact	CD, EP
2003	The Factory Incident	"Rail" w/ "Vacillator"	Postfact	Split 7" with Last Burning Embers
2003	Pseudo Heroes	"Prison of Small Perception"	Go-Kart	CD, album. Featured vocalist on track 4 "Bad Show"
2004	The Factory Incident	"Redtape"	Postfact	CD, EP
2013	History Repeated	"Flat Tires / History Repeated"	Rusty Knuckles	Split 7" with Flat Tires
2016	John Stabb	"Riding For Candyland, 1991-1993"	Morphius	CD, Album
