= Charles W. L. Hill =

British-born academic

Charles W. L. Hill is a British-born academic. As of 2016, he is the Hughes M. and Katherine G. Blake Endowed Professor in Business Administration and Professor of Management and Organization at the University of Washington's Foster School of Business in Seattle, where he has been teaching since 1988.

He previously taught at Michigan State University from 1986 to 1988, and the University of Manchester Institute of Science and Technology, now part of the University of Manchester, from 1983 to 86. He was a visiting professor at Texas A&M University from 1985 to 1986.

In 2004, he co-authored Strategic Management: An Integrated Approach with G. R. Jones. In 2005, he authored International Business: Competing in the Global Market Place .
