= Charlie Hill (cricketer) =

English cricketer (born 1985)

Personal information
- Full name: Charles Michael McLean Hill
- Born: 27 May 1985 (age 41); Wimbledon, London, England
- Batting: Left-handed
- Bowling: Right-arm off break

Domestic team information
- Years: Team
- 2007–2009: Oxford University

Career statistics
Competition	First-class
Matches	3
Runs scored	90
Batting average	18.00
100s/50s	–/–
Top score	29
Balls bowled	438
Wickets	2
Bowling average	101.00
5 wickets in innings	–
10 wickets in match	–
Best bowling	1/77
Catches/stumpings	1/–
- Source: Cricinfo, 9 May 2020

Charles 'Charlie' Michael McLean Hill (born 27 May 1985) is an English former first-class cricketer.

Hill was born at Wimbledon in May 1985. He was educated at Tonbridge School, before going up to Trinity College, Oxford. While studying at Oxford, he made three first-class appearances against Cambridge University in The University Matches of 2007, 2008 and 2009. He scored a total of 90 runs in his three matches, with a high score of 29. With his off break bowling, he took 2 wickets from 73 overs bowled.
