= Peter Moffett (drummer) =

American drummer

Peter Moffett is an American drummer who has played for the punk rock bands Government Issue, Burning Airlines, and Wool. He has worked as a drum tech for The B-52s, Alanis Morissette and Kelly Clarkson's drummer Lester Estelle II. Critics have described him as "a 'listening' drummer" with a "minimal but aggressive" style who "plays for the song", shifting between odd time signatures and rock beats, and using one idea for a song's foundation while keeping other ideas in reserve. Joe Wong describes his signature style as balancing "jagged, angular rhythmic invention with arena rock bombast".

== Personal life ==
Moffet's mother was a mechanical artist and his father was a technical writer for Applied Physics Laboratory and member of the American Federation of Musicians who played piano. Moffet was raised Catholic and stopped attending church after his confirmation; he describes himself as a "recovering Catholic". He started playing drums in junior high school, having wanted to play since elementary school. His early musical influences include Emerson, Lake & Palmer and Dead Kennedys.

Moffet realized he was gay when he was five and publicly came out to The Advocate magazine in 1999 at the age of 34. He identifies as a bear and credits the tolerant attitude of the indie rock scene with saving his life.
