= The Factory Incident =

US musical group

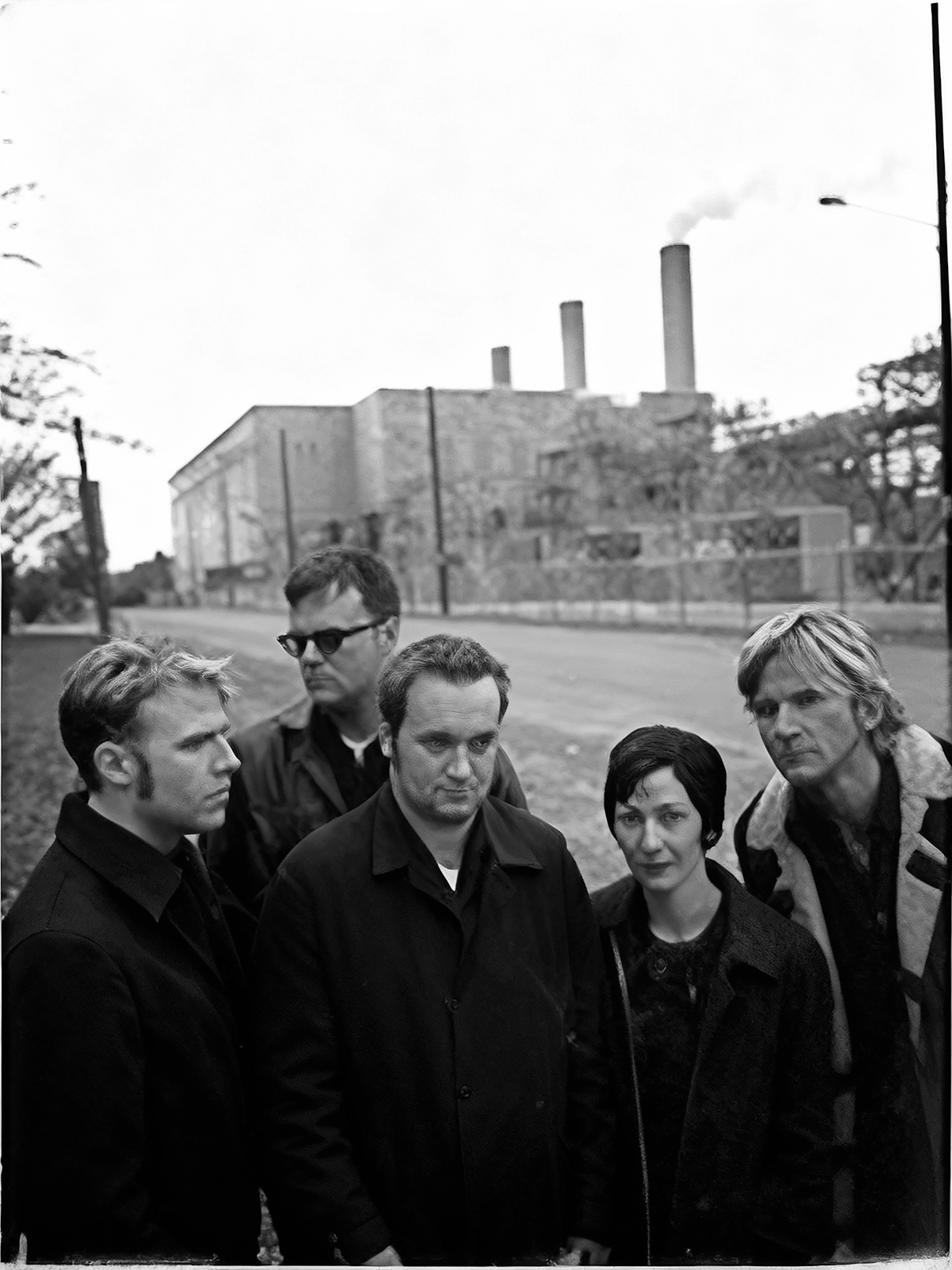
- The Factory Incident at Buzzard Point in Washington, D.C., 2001

Background information
- Origin: Washington, D.C.
- Genres: Post-punk, indie rock
- Years active: 2000–2005
- Labels: Postfact Records
- Spinoffs: Government Issue; Tone; Technostress
- Members: John Stabb; Karl Hill; Aimee Soubier; Shaun Wright; Stephen Brown

The Factory Incident was an American post-punk band from Washington, D.C. Active from 2000 to 2005, the group featured Government Issue vocalist John Stabb and released two EPs and a split single on its Postfact Records imprint.

== History ==
After Government Issue ended, Stabb formed The Factory Incident in 2000 with guitarists Karl Hill and Aimee Soubier, bassist Shaun Wright and drummer Stephen Brown.

The band set up Postfact Records for its debut EP, Helmshore (2001), followed by a split 7-inch with Last Burning Embers in 2003 and the EP Redtape in 2004, distributed through Dischord Records. The group ended in 2005; members later played in other projects, and in 2013 Stabb revived Government Issue with Hill on drums. Hill and Soubier later formed the trio Technostress, whose self-titled 2008 EP on Postfact drew comparisons to early post-punk acts such as Public Image Ltd. and Peter Murphy.

== Musical style and influences ==
The Factory Incident mixed first-wave post-punk influences such as Wire, Gang of Four, Joy Division, Echo & the Bunnymen, Killing Joke and The Jesus and Mary Chain with shoegaze- and indie rock–style guitar textures. Their songs emphasized layered guitars, a driving rhythm section and lyrics Stabb described as more "grown-up" and less sarcastic than his earlier work.

== Legacy ==
The band is noted for linking D.C.’s hardcore lineage with the more melodic, textural sound of early-2000s post-punk and indie rock, and for documenting Stabb’s later work beyond Government Issue. In a 2008 interview with German magazine Ox-Fanzine, Stabb reflected that The Factory Incident had run its course after roughly five years and discussed his plans to form a new band with Hill and other musicians.

== Band members ==
- John Stabb – vocals
- Karl Hill – guitar
- Aimee Soubier – guitar
- Shaun Wright – bass
- Stephen Brown – drums

== Discography ==
Year	Title	Label	Format
2001	Helmshore	Postfact Records	EP
2003	"Rail" b/w "Vacillator" (split with Last Burning Embers)	Postfact Records	7-inch single
2004	Redtape	Postfact Records	EP
