= Karl Hill =

German opera singer (1831–1893)

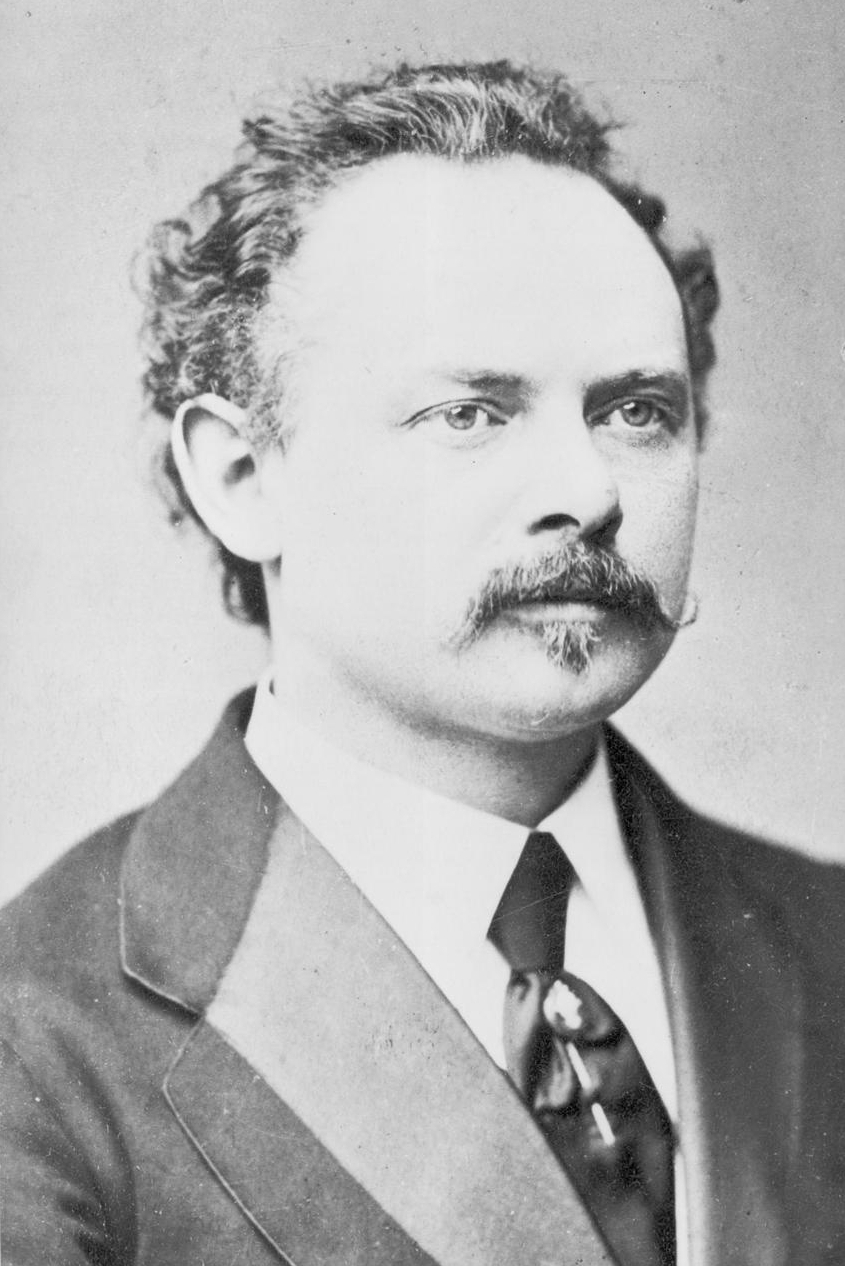
Karl Hill (1831–1893) by Emilie Bieber (1810–1884)

Karl Hill (9 May 1831 – 12 January 1893) was a German baritone opera singer.

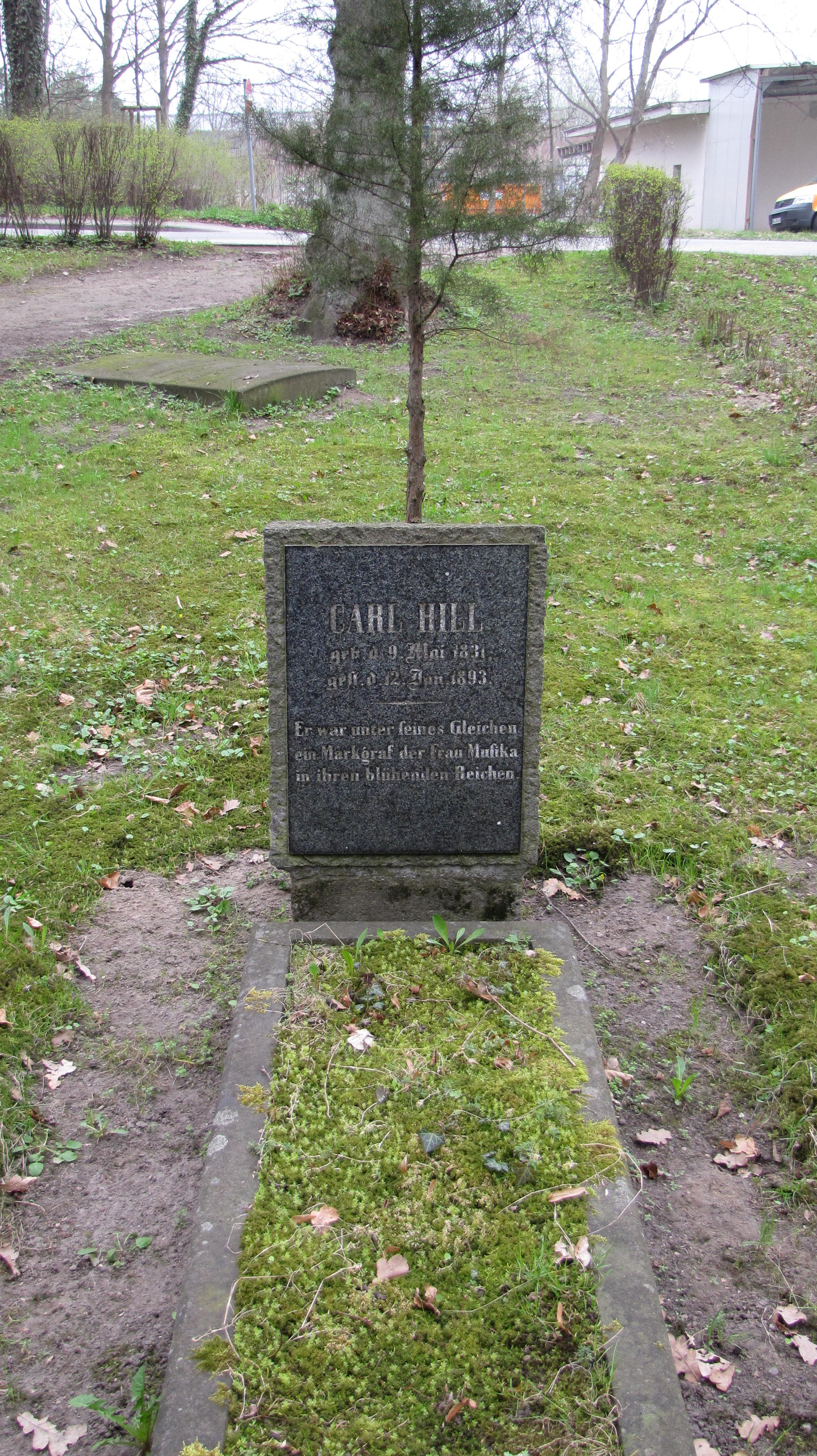
Karl Hill's grave in the cemetery at Sachsenberg near Schwerin

== Life ==
Hill was born in Idstein im Taunus, near mountains north of Wiesbaden, but he lived and worked for most of his life in Schwerin, where he died. He studied in Frankfurt, and made his debut at Schwerin in 1868 as Jacob in Étienne Méhul's Joseph.

He sang the role of Alberich in the first performance of Richard Wagner's Der Ring des Nibelungen at Bayreuth in 1876. Also at Bayreuth, he sang the role of Klingsor in the premiere of Parsifal in 1882. In 1890, mental illness caused him to retire from the stage.

== Other roles ==
His Wagnerian roles also included The Dutchman in Der fliegende Holländer, and Hans Sachs in Die Meistersinger von Nürnberg. Non-Wagnerian roles included Mozart's Count Almaviva in The Marriage of Figaro, and Don Giovanni and Leporello in Don Giovanni.

== Sources ==
- Forbes, Elizabeth (1992). Hill, Karl, in Sadie, Stanley (ed.). The New Grove Dictionary of Opera. Oxford: Oxford University Press. pp. 716–7. ISBN 978-0-19-522186-2.
- Forbes, Elizabeth (2008). "Hill, Karl" in Laura Macy (ed.), The Grove Book of Opera Singers, p. 223. Oxford University Press. ISBN 978-0-19-533765-5
