= Government Issue =

American hardcore punk band

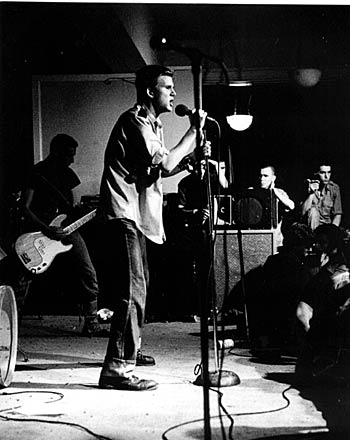
- Members John Stabb (center) and Brian Gay (left) of Government Issue performing at the Wilson Center in April 1981

Background information
- Also known as: G.I.
- Origin: Washington, D.C., U.S.
- Genre: Hardcore punk
- Years active: 1980–1989; 2007; 2010; 2012; 2014–2015
- Labels: Dischord; Fountain of Youth; Mystic; Giant; DC-Jam Records
- Spinoffs: Minor Threat; Rites of Spring; Jawbox; Burning Airlines; The Factory Incident; Office of Future Plans
- Past members: John Stabb; Marc Alberstadt; John Barry; Brian Gay; Brian Baker; Tom Lyle; Mitch Parker; Rob Moss; Mike Fellows; John Leonard; Steve Hansgen; Sean Saley; J. Robbins; Peter Moffett; Karl Hill; S.Dwayne Bruner; Evan Tanner

Government Issue was an American hardcore punk band from Washington, D.C., active from 1980 to 1989. During its nine-year run, the band went through frequent lineup changes, with vocalist John Stabb as the only constant member. At various times the group included notable musicians such as Brian Baker, Mike Fellows, Steve Hansgen, J. Robbins, and Peter Moffett.

Rooted in the Washington, D.C. hardcore scene, Government Issue later incorporated elements of heavy metal, new wave, and psychedelic rock into their sound. Although this evolution sometimes led them to be overlooked compared with other D.C. hardcore bands, their stylistic range proved influential for later punk rock groups. The band reunited for occasional shows with varying lineups, continuing until Stabb's death from stomach cancer in 2016.

== History ==
=== 1980–1981: Formation and debut ===
Government Issue originated in 1980 as The Stab, from which lead singer John Schroeder derived his pseudonym John Stabb. As the members of The Stab drifted apart, Stabb and drummer Marc Alberstadt recruited guitarist John Barry and bassist Brian Gay, changing the band's name to Government Issue. They made their live debut at the two-day Unheard Music Festival in December 1980, but not as Government Issue: Alberstadt was sick and unable to perform, so the band invited guest players to fill in on both nights and performed under the name The Substitutes. The band's second performance was shut down midway by the police.

Government Issue's debut EP Legless Bull was recorded with this original lineup and released through local label Dischord Records in September 1981, after which Gay left to attend college and was replaced by Brian Baker of Minor Threat, who were on hiatus at the time. Baker later recalled that "Ian [MacKaye] and Jeff [Nelson] were gonna start something with Eddie [Janney] and John Falls, so I joined the DC band I liked the best who needed somebody — Government Issue. They were a great band, especially early on." Government Issue also contributed two tracks to Flex Your Head, Dischord's 1982 compilation album of D.C.-area hardcore punk bands.

=== 1981–1985: Lineup and label changes ===
Following the release of Legless Bull, Government Issue underwent a series of lineup changes. Tom Lyle filled in on bass for one show while Baker went to see Fear play Saturday Night Live on October 31st, 1981. Government Issue's next show, in November of that year on a bill with T.S.O.L. at the 9:30 Club, was Baker's last as bassist.

John Barry left the band to move to Bulgaria, while Baker moved from bass to guitar and Lyle became their full-time bassist. Baker later remarked that his guitar style did not fully suit the band, recalling: "I wasn't a bass player and Government Issue was a chance to play guitar. They were better with John Barry on guitar but they were biggest when I was in the band. Their whole sound was his insane guitar playing, which I played nothing like. I played like Ace Frehley." The Stabb/Baker/Lyle/Alberstadt lineup recorded the Make an Effort EP, released in 1982 on Fountain of Youth Records. Baker then rejoined Minor Threat in early 1982, later describing his departure as "amicable after John Stabb calmed down" and noting that "everyone else understood and didn't have a problem."

After Baker’s exit, Lyle moved from bass to guitar. Lyle would go on to be responsible for providing the artwork for all their albums except for 1986's You and 1988's Crash and writing most of the band's music until Crash. Mitch Parker joined on bass for Government Issue's 1983 debut LP Boycott Stabb, which was produced by Ian MacKaye.

Rob Moss briefly replaced Parker on bass, followed by Mike Fellows, who played on 1984's Joyride, produced by Brian Baker. Fellows soon left to join Rites of Spring and was replaced by John Leonard. The band began work on a new album, recording basic tracks at CBGB and finishing them in a proper studio. The album, entitled The Fun Just Never Ends, was released in 1985. Seeking stronger promotion, Government Issue switched from Fountain of Youth to Mystic Records, releasing two more records in 1985: the EP Give Us Stabb or Give Us Death and the live album Live on Mystic.

=== 1986–1989: Final lineup and breakup ===
According to Tom Lyle, the band's next album, 1986's eponymous Government Issue, was originally intended as a concept album of sorts, poking fun at progressive rock records of the 1970s. While this plan was abandoned, many of the interstitial musical pieces written as segues between tracks still found their way onto the album. Leonard and Alberstadt left the band during the album's recording, for which the band returned to Fountain of Youth, and the album was completed with drummer Sean Saley and ex-Minor Threat bassist Steve Hansgen.

Government Issue saw Stabb moving in a more melodic direction, away from traditional hardcore and taking influence from The Damned's gothic rock sound. Hansgen and Saley subsequently left and were replaced by J. Robbins and Peter Moffett, respectively, and Government Issue moved to Giant Records for 1987's You, an album which chronicled Stabb's relationship with an underage girl. 1988's Crash continued the band's evolution into greater musical variety, and Giant reissued the band's Fountain of Youth releases. However, the band broke up in 1989. According to Robbins, a van accident and creative differences were contributing factors to the breakup:

The end of G.I. was in summer '89. After looking at the situation objectively, having done monster tours of the US and Europe, and after a terrible van accident in England where Pete shattered his ankle, we felt we were beating our heads against the wall. It was clear that all four of us had different ideas of what we wanted to do. I think those guys just got tired of working with each other. We booked one last show at 9:30 Club, which was massive, ridiculous, and fun. That was it.

=== Post-breakup activity and reunions ===
Following Government Issue's breakup the members moved on to other musical projects. Lyle released a solo album titled Sanctuary in 1992. Robbins founded Jawbox while Moffett joined Wool, and the two later reunited in Burning Airlines. Stabb reverted to his given name, playing with several Washington, D.C.-area bands in the 1990s before forming The Factory Incident in 2000 and then History Repeated in 2008 with whom Stabb's last ever performance was with on January 19, 2016.

Over a decade after the band's dissolution, a number of compilation albums and reissues of their material began to be released. In 2000 Dr. Strange Records released the career retrospective Complete History Volume One, followed by Complete History Volume Two in 2002. Dischord Records reissued Legless Bull in 2002 while Dr. Strange released Strange Wine: Live at CBGB August 30th, 1987 in 2003, consisting of live recordings and studio tracks remastered by Tom Lyle. 2005 saw the release of the DVD Live 1985.

On July 17, 2007 John Stabb was assaulted by five men near his home and required extensive facial reconstruction surgery. To help him and then-wife Mika Ackerman pay for his medical bills and lost wages, a benefit concert was held on September 23, 2007 which featured a reunited lineup of Stabb, Tom Lyle, and Brian Baker, joined by drummer William Knapp, performing as "Government Re-Issue". A portion of the proceeds from the 2007 Riot Fest concert were donated to Stabb to pay for his medical bills, as well as to J. Robbins, whose son had been diagnosed with spinal muscular atrophy. In 2009 DC-Jam Records released The Punk Remains the Same, an EP of live Government Issue tracks recorded in 1982 and 1983.

Government Issue reunited a second time for a performance in Washington, D.C. on December 11, 2010. The show, which included local bands The Goons & Set to Explode, featured the band's final lineup of Stabb, Lyle, Robbins, and Moffett, and was a benefit to raise medical funds for a local GI Fan Steve 'Stereo Faith.' McPhereson On April 11, 2014, Government Issue reunited for the final time with the original Legless Bull lineup of Stabb, John Barry, Brian Gay along with drummer Karl Hill for the Damaged City Festival in Washington, DC. After the final reunion show, Stabb said "Government Issue is a group again, and it was so much fun playing Damaged City Fest 2014, we decided to just keep it going." The band continued in 2015, playing the Bad Ass Weekend festival in Houston that February and a five-date tour of the Southeastern United States in October and November, including a performance at The Fest. Stabb died of stomach cancer on May 7, 2016 at the age of 54.

== Style and influence ==
Government Issue was one of the best bands in the history of American Hardcore. For one reason or another, they were jinxed. Their van'd break down; they'd do tours and have ten people at the show because of no publicity — everything bad that could happen to a band happened to them. But they were amazing.

— Dave Smalley, singer for DYS, Dag Nasty, All, and Down by Law

Though Government Issue began as a hardcore punk act, over time their music evolved to incorporate other styles. Steven Blush, author of American Hardcore: A Tribal History, writes that they "vied with Minor Threat as the top [Washington, D.C. hardcore] band in 1981–1982" and that Legless Bull "best exemplified smartass suburban HC." But by 1982, with Brian Baker and Tom Lyle in the lineup, the band began to develop a sound more akin to heavy rock than pure hardcore. Steve Huey of Allmusic notes that the band "carried the torch for traditional hardcore punk on their early records, but evolved into something more adventurous by adding bits of metal, new wave pop, and psychedelia".

By 1986's Government Issue Stabb was moving in a more melodic direction influenced by the gothic rock of The Damned, and by 1988's Crash the group was at its most musically diverse. Stabb himself later remarked that Government Issue "proved that we were more than just a hardcore band. We'd graduated from the school of 'bang and howl' and we really bummed out a small portion of our punk audience", and that "we'd moved on from the hardcore world into melodic, well-crafted punk with a decidedly pop edge." Aaron Burgess of Alternative Press notes that the continual evolution in sound over the band's nine-year lifespan made their music more influential to later generations of punk rock groups:

Though they started out playing solid, standard-issue melodic hardcore, Government Issue weren't afraid to let their outside influences, no matter how incongruous, infect their music—or, in Stabb's case, their look, as well [...] So, while Stabb's hairdos and stage clothes got increasingly kookier, so did the band's music draw ideas from pop, goth, psychedelia, Middle Eastern music and beyond. And while changes like these could seem like sellout moves for a group that once wrote a song called "Rock 'N' Roll Bullshit", they were a vital next step in the evolution of [insert whatever eclectic punk CD you're listening to today].

However, though they did have a following in the straight edge community, Government Issue's stylistic expansion from one album to the next alienated much of their early hardcore audience. Blush writes that "Unfortunately, most who went to see G.I. through the 80s still expected to hear hardcore reminiscent of the first EP. The group was moving into a softer, R.E.M. direction, and none of their fans gave a shit about such profound maturity." Huey remarks that the band "has remained somewhat overlooked in relation to the rest of the D.C. hardcore bands of their time, in part because their music never really fit the proto-emo bent of much of the local Dischord stable", while Burgess notes that they nonetheless "made history in their own way by never fitting into the scene most people naturally associated with their city."

== Band members ==
Government Issue lineups
| 1980–September 1981 Legless Bull | John Stabb – vocals; John Barry – guitar; Brian Gay – bass; Marc Alberstadt – drums |
| September–November 1981 | John Stabb – vocals; John Barry – guitar; Brian Baker – bass; Marc Alberstadt – drums |
| November 1981–April 1982 Make an Effort | John Stabb – vocals; Brian Baker – guitar; Tom Lyle – bass; Marc Alberstadt – drums |
| April 1982–summer 1983 Boycott Stabb | John Stabb – vocals; Tom Lyle – guitar; Mitch Parker – bass; Marc Alberstadt – drums |
| Summer–fall 1983 | John Stabb – vocals; Tom Lyle – guitar; Rob Moss – bass; Marc Alberstadt – drums |
| Fall 1983–spring 1984 Joyride | John Stabb – vocals; Tom Lyle – guitar; Mike Fellows – bass; Marc Alberstadt – drums |
| Spring 1984–January 1986 The Fun Just Never Ends Give Us Stabb or Give Us Death Live on Mystic Government Issue | John Stabb – vocals; Tom Lyle – guitar; John Leonard – bass; Marc Alberstadt – drums |
| January–summer 1986 | John Stabb – vocals; Tom Lyle – guitar; Steve Hansgen – bass; Sean Saley – drums |
| Summer 1986–1989 You Strange Wine EP Crash | John Stabb – vocals; Tom Lyle – guitar; J. Robbins – bass; Peter Moffett – drums |
| 2007 reunion show (as Government Re-Issue) | John Stabb – vocals; Tom Lyle – guitar; Brian Baker – bass; William Knapp – drums |
| 2010 reunion show | John Stabb – vocals; Tom Lyle – guitar; J. Robbins – bass; Pete Moffett – drums |
| 2014 reunion show | John Stabb – vocals; John Barry – guitar; Brian Gay – bass; Karl Hill – drums |
| Early 2015 shows | John Stabb – vocals; John Barry – guitar; S. Dwayne Bruner – bass; Karl Hill – drums |
| Late 2015 shows | John Stabb – vocals; John Barry – guitar; S. Dwayne Bruner – bass; Evan Tanner – drums |

- John Stabb – lead vocals (1980–June 1989; 2007 and 2010 reunion shows; 2014–2015)
- Marc Alberstadt – drums (1980–January 1986)
- John Barry – guitar (1980–November 1981; 2014–2015)
- Brian Gay – bass guitar (1980–September 1981; 2014 reunion show)
- Brian Baker – bass guitar (September–November 1981; 2007 reunion show), guitar (November 1981–April 1982)
- Tom Lyle – bass guitar (October 1981–April 1982), guitar (April 1982–June 1989; 2007 and 2010 reunion shows)
- Mitch Parker – bass guitar (summer 1982–summer 1983)
- Rob Moss – bass guitar (summer–fall 1983)
- Mike Fellows – bass guitar (fall 1983–spring 1984)
- John Leonard – bass guitar (spring 1984–winter 1985)
- Steve Hansgen – bass guitar (summer 1986)
- Sean Saley – drums (winter–summer 1986)
- J. Robbins – bass guitar (summer 1986–June 1989; 2010 reunion show)
- Peter Moffett – drums (summer 1986–June 1989; 2010 reunion show)
- William Knapp – drums (2007 reunion show)
- Karl Hill – drums (2014–spring 2015)
- S. Dwayne Bruner – bass (2015)
- Evan Tanner – drums (summer–fall 2015)

== Discography ==
=== Studio albums ===
- Boycott Stabb (1983)
- Joyride (1984)
- Give Us Stabb or Give Us Death (1985)
- The Fun Just Never Ends (1985)
- Government Issue (1986)
- You (1987)
- Crash (1988)

==== Boycott Stabb ====
Boycott Stabb cover

Boycott Stabb is the debut album by the band, released as a split release between independent record labels Dischord and Fountain of Youth. In late 2010, the album was released by Dischord as Boycott Stabb Complete Session, which collects this album and previously unreleased outtakes and extras. On the Complete Session, side A has the original Boycott Stabb songs, while side B has the outtakes.

Track listing for Boycott Stabb:

Boycott Stabb
| No. | Title | Length |
|---|---|---|
| 1. | "Hall of Fame" | 1:01 |
| 2. | "Hour of 1" | 1:17 |
| 3. | "G.I." | 0:39 |
| 4. | "Puppet on a String" | 1:10 |
| 5. | "Sheer Terror" | 3:37 |
| 6. | "Happy People" | 1:10 |
| 7. | "Lost In Limbo" | 0:36 |
| 8. | "Plain to See" | 1:47 |
| 9. | "Party Line" | 1:13 |
| 10. | "Here's the Rope" | 2:11 |
| 11. | "Insomniac" | 1:02 |
| Total length: | | 15:43 |

Musicians that played on Boycott Stabb and its Complete Sessions:

- John Stabb – vocals
- John Barry – guitar
- Brian Gay – bass
- Marc Alberstadt – drums

=== Live albums ===
- Live! (1985)
- Finale (1989)
- No Way Out 82 (1990)
- Strange Wine: Live at CBGB August 30th, 1987 (2003)

=== Singles & EPs ===
- Legless Bull (1981)
- Make an Effort (1982)
- Fun And Games (1988)
- Strange Wine EP (1988)
- Video Soundtrack (1989)
- G.I.'s First Demo (2004)
- The Punk Remains the Same (2009)

==== Legless Bull ====
Legless Bull cover

Legless Bull is the first EP and release by the band; it was released on Dischord Records in September 1981. It was re-released with five other seven-inch EPs on the 1995 compilation album Dischord 1981: The Year In Seven Inches. It was recorded at Inner Ear Studios and mixed by Dischord co-owner Ian MacKaye.

All tracks are written by Government Issue, except where noted.

Legless Bull track listing
| No. | Title | Writer(s) | Length |
|---|---|---|---|
| 1. | "Religious Ripoff" | | 1:14 |
| 2. | "Fashionite" | | 0:37 |
| 3. | "Rock 'N' Roll Bullshit" | | 1:13 |
| 4. | "Anarchy Is Dead" | | 0:30 |
| 5. | "Sheer Terror" | | 1:28 |
| 6. | "Asshole" | | 1:08 |
| 7. | "Bored to Death" | | 0:57 |
| 8. | "No Rights" | | 0:48 |
| 9. | "I'm James Dean" | A.J. Ellen | 0:17 |
| 10. | "Cowboy Fashion" | | 0:44 |
| Total length: | | | 8:56 |

=== Compilation albums ===
- Joyride / The Fun Just Never Ends (1990)
- Beyond (1991)
- Best Of Government Issue • Live - The Mystic Years (1992)
- Make An Effort (1994)
- Complete History Volume One (2000)
- Complete History Volume Two (2002)
- Best of Government Issue (2009)

=== Video albums ===
- Live 1985 (2005)
- A HarD.C.ore Day's Night (2008)
