= All Through a Life =

EP by Rites of Spring
- Released: 1987
- Recorded: January 1986
- Genre: Punk rock
- Length: 9:56
- Label: Dischord
- Producer: Ian Mackaye

Rites of Spring chronology
Rites of Spring (1985)	All Through a Life (1987)	End on End (1991)

Professional ratings
Review scores
Source	Rating
Allmusic	4.5/5 stars

All Through a Life is the first and only EP by American punk rock band Rites of Spring. It was released in 1987 by Dischord Records, after the band had broken up.

== Tracklist ==
All tracks are written by Rites of Spring.

No.	Title	Length
1.	"All Through a Life"	2:27
2.	"Hidden Wheel"	2:31
3.	"In Silence/Words Away"	3:00
4.	"Patience"	1:58
Total length:		9:56
