= End on End =

Compilation album by Rites of Spring
- Released: 1991
- Recorded: February 1985 and January 1986
- Studio: Inner Ear Studios
- Genre: Emo
- Length: 50:39
- Label: Dischord
- Producer: Ian MacKaye

Rites of Spring chronology
All Through a Life (1987)	End on End (1991)	Six Song Demo (2012)

Professional ratings
Review scores
Source	Rating
Allmusic	4.5/5 stars
Sputnikmusic	4.5/5

End on End is a compilation album by American punk rock band Rites of Spring, released in 1991 on Dischord Records. The album consists of the group's first album Rites of Spring and its EP All Through a Life, along with an extra studio track.

== Tracklist ==
All tracks are written by Rites of Spring.

No.	Title	Length
1.	"Spring"	2:09
2.	"Deeper Than Inside"	2:17
3.	"For Want Of"	3:09
4.	"Hain's Point"	2:08
5.	"All There Is"	2:54
6.	"Drink Deep"	4:54
7.	"Other Way Around"	4:01
8.	"Theme"	2:19
9.	"By Design"	2:38
10.	"Remainder"	2:30
11.	"Persistent Vision"	2:21
12.	"Nudes"	2:48
13.	"End on End"	7:23
14.	"All Through a Life"	2:27
15.	"Hidden Wheel"	2:31
16.	"In Silence/Words Away"	3:00
17.	"Patience"	1:58
Total length:		51:29

== Personnel ==
- Rites of Spring:
  - Guy Picciotto - vocals, guitar
  - Eddie Janney - guitar
  - Mike Fellows - bass guitar
  - Brendan Canty - drums
- Ian MacKaye - producer
- Michael Hampton - producer
- Silver Sonya - 2001 Remastering
