= Will Oldham discography =

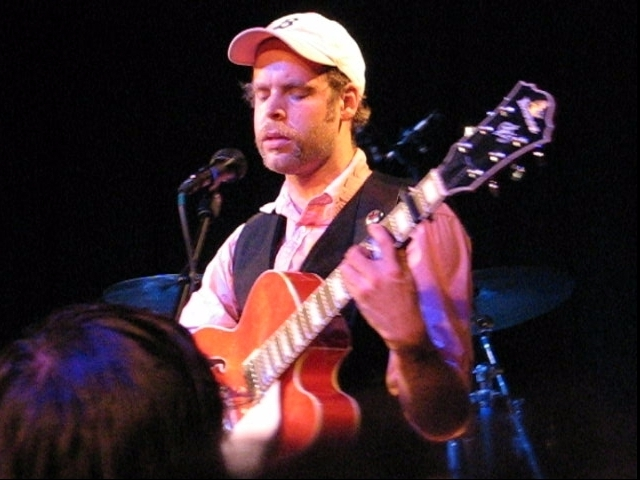
Oldham in 2006

This is a list of recordings by American singer and actor Will Oldham (a.k.a. Bonnie 'Prince' Billy, Palace Music, etc.).

== Main discography ==
The nature of Oldham's work, with constant changes in backing musicians and even the names under which he records, can make for a confusing discography. Below are his releases in as simplified a form as possible.

=== Albums ===
A few of these albums are credited to another artist alongside Will Oldham but with Oldham providing vocals throughout each of the tracks they clearly belong on a list of Oldham albums.

== Studio albums ==
| Year | Album | Released As | Additional Info |
|---|---|---|---|
| 1993 | There Is No-One What Will Take Care of You | Palace Brothers | |
| 1994 | Days in the Wake | Palace Brothers | Original release had eponymous album title: Palace Brothers |
| 1995 | Viva Last Blues | Palace Music | |
| 1996 | Arise Therefore | Palace Music | Re-released through iTunes as Bonnie 'Prince' Billy. |
| 1997 | Joya | Will Oldham | Re-released through iTunes as Bonnie 'Prince' Billy. |

=== As Bonnie 'Prince' Billy ===
| Year | Album | Released as | Peak chart positions | | |
| Year | Album | Released as | UK Album Chart | US Billboard 200 | US Heatseekers |
|---|---|---|---|---|---|
| 1999 | I See a Darkness | Bonnie 'Prince' Billy | 151 | - | - |
| 2001 | Ease Down the Road | Bonnie 'Prince' Billy | 88 | - | - |
| 2003 | Master and Everyone | Bonnie 'Prince' Billy | 48 | - | - |
| 2004 | Sings Greatest Palace Music | Bonnie 'Prince' Billy | 63 | - | - |
| 2005 | Superwolf | Bonnie 'Prince' Billy & Matt Sweeney | 114 | - | - |
| 2006 | The Brave and the Bold | Tortoise & Bonnie 'Prince' Billy | 101 | - | - |
| 2006 | The Letting Go | Bonnie 'Prince' Billy | 70 | 194 | 8 |
| 2007 | Wai Notes | Dawn McCarthy & Bonny Billy | - | - | - |
| 2008 | Lie Down in the Light | Bonnie 'Prince' Billy | 122 | - | 10 |
| 2009 | Beware | Bonnie 'Prince' Billy | 71 | 114 | 2 |
| 2010 | The Wonder Show of the World | Bonnie 'Prince' Billy & The Cairo Gang | 170 | - | 16 |
| 2011 | Wolfroy Goes to Town | Bonnie 'Prince' Billy | 150 | - | - |
| 2012 | The Marble Downs | Trembling Bells & Bonnie 'Prince' Billy | - | - | - |
| 2013 | What the Brothers Sang | Dawn McCarthy & Bonnie 'Prince' Billy | - | - | - |
| 2013 | Bonnie 'Prince' Billy | Bonnie 'Prince' Billy | - | - | - |
| 2014 | Singer's Grave – A Sea of Tongues | Bonnie 'Prince' Billy | - | - | - |
| 2016 | Fanatic Voyage [tribute to The Mekons] | Chivalrous Amoekons | - | - | - |
| 2016 | Epic Jammers and Fortunate Little Ditties | Bitchin Bajas & Bonnie "Prince" Billy | | | |
| 2017 | Best Troubador | Bonnie 'Prince' Billy | - | - | - |
| 2017 | Wolf of the Cosmos | Bonnie 'Prince' Billy | - | - | - |
| 2018 | Songs of Love and Horror | Will Oldham | - | - | - |
| 2019 | I Made a Place | Bonnie 'Prince' Billy | - | - | - |
| 2021 | Superwolves | Bonnie 'Prince' Billy & Matt Sweeney | - | - | - |
| 2022 | Blind Date Party | Bill Callahan & Bonnie 'Prince' Billy | - | - | - |
| 2023 | Keeping Secrets Will Destroy You | Bonnie 'Prince' Billy | - | - | - |
| 2025 | The Purple Bird | Bonnie 'Prince' Billy | - | - | - |
| 2026 | We Are Together Again | Bonnie 'Prince' Billy | - | - | - |

=== Live albums ===
- Get the Fuck on Jolly Live – Bonny Billy and Marquis de Tren featuring the Monkey Boys (2001) limited edition tour CD
- Summer in the Southeast – Bonnie 'Prince' Billy (November 15, 2005)
- Wilding in the West – Bonnie 'Prince' Billy (January 21, 2008)
- Is It The Sea? – Bonnie 'Prince' Billy with Harem Scarem & Alex Neilson (October 20, 2008) UK #172
- Funtown Comedown – Bonny Billy & The Picket Line (December 15, 2009)
- The Bonnie Bells of Oxford – Trembling Bells & Bonnie 'Prince' Billy (February 21, 2013)
- Pond Scum – Bonnie "Prince" Billy (January 22, 2016) BBC sessions

=== Compilation albums ===
- Lost Blues and Other Songs – Palace Music (March 31, 1997)
- Guarapero/Lost Blues 2 – Will Oldham (February 21, 2000)
- Little Lost Blues – Bonny Billy (September 19, 2006)

=== EPs ===
This section again contains several releases which are credited to Oldham alongside another artist or which are credited to a group other than Palace/Palace Brothers/Palace Music/Palace Songs. In these cases Oldham's contribution is such that they merit mention in his own discography rather than in the collaborations section.

- Goat Songs – The Sundowners (Sea Note, 1993)
- An Arrow Through the Bitch – Palace Brothers (Domino, 1994)
- Hope – Palace Songs (1994)
- The Mountain – Palace (Drag City, 1995)
- Songs Put Together For (The Broken Giant) – Palace Soundtrack (Drag City, 1996)
- Western Music – Will Oldham (Ovni, 1997)
- Black/Rich Music – Will Oldham (Drag City, 1998) (re-release of Songs Put Together (for the Broken Giant))
- Blue Lotus Feet – Bonnie 'Prince' Billy (Domino, 1998)
- Dream of a Drunk Black Southern Eagle – Bonnie 'Prince' Billy (Domino, 1999)
- More Revery (live version) – Bonny Billy (Travels in Constants Vol 7, 2000)
- Ode Music – Will Oldham (Drag City, 2000)
- All Most Heaven – Will Oldham and Rian Murphy (Drag City, 2000)
- Get on Jolly – Bonnie Billy and the Marquis de Tren (Drag City, 2000)
- More Revery (studio version) – Bonny Billy (Temporary Residence, 2001)
- Amalgamated Sons of Rest – Amalgamated Sons of Rest (Galaxia, 2002)
- Slitch Music – The Continental OP (Drag City, 2002)
- Seafarers Music – Will Oldham (Drag City, 2004)
- Pebbles and Ripples – Bonny Billy and Brightblack (Galaxia, 2004) / (Split EP)
- I Gave You – Bonny/Sweeney (Drag City, 2005)
- Strange Form of Life – Bonnie 'Prince' Billy (Drag City, 2007)
- Ask Forgiveness – Bonnie 'Prince' Billy with Meg Baird & Greg Weeks (Drag City, November 19, 2007)
- Chijimi EP – Bonnie 'Prince' Billy (Drag City/ Palace Records, 2009) / (Tour-Only 10-inch)
- Among The Gold – Bonnie 'Prince' Billy & Cheyenne Marie Mize (May 19, 2009)
- The Mindeater – Bonnie 'Prince' Billy & The Phantom Family Halo (10-inch EP) / (September 2011)
- Bonnie & Mariee EP – Bonnie 'Prince' Billy & Mariee Sioux (Spiritual Pajamas, Feb. 2012)
- The Duchess – Trembling Bells & Bonnie 'Prince' Billy (Honest Jon's Records, April 2012)
- Hummingbird EP – Bonnie 'Prince' Billy (Spiritual Pajamas, May 2012)
- Now Here's My Plan – Bonnie 'Prince' Billy (Domino, July 2012)
- Solemns – Bonnie 'Prince' Billy & Marquis de Tren (Drag City, 2013)
- Barely Regal - Bonnie 'Prince' Billy (Drag City, 2014)
- Tip The Glass & Feel The Bottom – Bonnie 'Prince' Billy & The Cairo Gang (Future Oak Record Co., 2015) / (10-inch EP)
- The Happy Song / At The Corner Of The Stairs – Bonnie 'Prince' Billy & Oscar Parsons (Split EP) (Palace Records PR502)
- Wallins Creek Girls – Bonnie 'Prince' Billy & Nathan Salsburg (Record Store Day 2017) (Paradise of Bachelors 2017)
- The Best Of Folks/Harbour Men, 7″ – Bonnie Prince Billy/Naked Shortsellers (Split EP)

=== Singles ===
| Year | Title | Artist | Label/Number |
|---|---|---|---|
| 1993 | "Ohio River Boat Song" / "Drinking Woman" | Palace Brothers | Drag City DC25 |
| 1993 | "Come In" / "Trudy Dies" | Palace | Drag City DC37 |
| 1994 | "Horses" / "Stable Will" | Palace Songs | Drag City DC47 |
| 1994 | "O How I Enjoy the Light" / "Marriage" | Palace Songs | Drag City DC64 |
| 1994 | "West Palm Beach" / "Gulf Shores" | Palace | Drag City DC61 |
| 1995 | "The Mountain" / "(End of) Travelling" | Palace | Drag City DC71 |
| 1995 | "Gezundheit" / "Let the Wires Ring" | Palace | Hausmusik 12 |
| 1995 | "Black/Rich Tune" / "You Have Cum in Your Hair..." | Palace Music | Drag City (no Cat. No.) |
| 1996 | "Every Mother's Son" / "No More Rides" | Palace | Drag City DC83 |
| 1996 | "For the Mekons et al." (Live) / "Stable Will" (Live) | Palace Live | Palace Records PR13 |
| 1996 | "Little Blue Eyes" / "The Spider's Dude Is Often There" | Palace Music | Drag City DC91 |
| 1997 | "Patience" / "Take However Long You Want" | Will Oldham | Drag City DC118 |
| 1997 | Little Joya: "Prologue" / "Joya" / "Exit Music (for a Dick)" | Will Oldham | Drag City DC107X |
| 1997 | "In My Mind" (split 7-inch single with Rising Shotgun) | Will Oldham | Palace Records PR18 |
| 1997 | "Big Balls" (split 7-inch single titled "Sides 5-6") | Palace Contribution | Skin Graft GR26 |
| 1998 | "I Am Drinking Again" / "Dreaming My Dreams" (CD) | Bonnie 'Prince' Billy | Domino Rug 67 cd |
| 1998 | "Black Dissimulation" / "No Such As What I Want" (7-inch) | Bonnie 'Prince' Billie | All City Nomad |
| 1998 | "The Sun Shines Down On Me" / "I Confess" | Bonnie 'Prince' Billy | LowFly LF075 |
| 1998 | "One With the Birds" / "Southside of the World" | Bonnie 'Prince' Billie | Palace Records PR20 |
| 1999 | "Let's Start a Family (Blacks)" / "A Whorehouse Is Any House" | Bonnie 'Prince' Billy | Sub Pop SP 462 |
| 2000 | "Little Boy Blue" / "Little Boy Blue 2" / "Blue Boy" | Bonnie 'Blue' Billy | Western Vinyl WEST009 |
| 2001 | "Just to See My Holly Home" | Bonnie 'Prince' Billy | Domino (promo) |
| 2002 | "Forest Time" (one sided 10-inch single) | Will Oldham | Artimo 01 |
| 2002 | "Brother Warrior" (split 7-inch single with rainYwood) | Bonny Billy | Palace Records PR27 |
| 2002 | "We All, Us Three, Will Ride" / "Barcelona" | Will Oldham | Isota SODY005 |
| 2003 | "Happy Child" / "Forest Time" | Bonnie 'Prince' Billy | Drag City DC232 |
| 2004 | "Agnes, Queen of Sorrow" / "Blokbuster" (7-inch version) | Bonnie 'Prince' Billy | Drag City DC278 – UK #69 |
| 2004 | "Agnes, Queen of Sorrow" / "Blokbuster" / "Pussyfooting" (CD Version) | Bonnie 'Prince' Billy | Drag City DC278 – UK #69 |
| 2004 | "No More Workhorse Blues" / "The Color of My Dreams, If I Had Dreams" (7-inch) | Bonnie 'Prince' Billy | Drag City DC285 – UK #87 |
| 2004 | "No More Workhorse Blues" / "The Color of My Dreams, If I Had Dreams" / "The Kiss" (CD) | Bonnie 'Prince' Billy | Drag City DC285 – UK #87 |
| 2005 | "Puff the Magic Dragon" (split 7-inch single) | Bonnie 'Prince' Billy | Lucky Dog 03 |
| 2005 | "I Gave You" / "Four Screams" | Bonny/Sweeney | Drag City DC298 – UK #210 |
| 2006 | "His Hands" | Bonnie 'Prince' Billy | iTunes (US only) |
| 2006 | "Cursed Sleep" / "The Signifying Wolf" / "God's Small Song" | Bonnie 'Prince' Billy | Drag City DC316 – UK #133 |
| 2006 | "Cold & Wet" / "Buried Treasure" (7-inch Version) | Bonnie 'Prince' Billy | Domino RUG235 – UK #186 |
| 2006 | "Cold & Wet" / "The Way" / "Buried Treasure" (12-inch/CD) | Bonnie 'Prince' Billy | Drag City DC318 |
| 2007 | "Lay & Love" / "Going to Acapulco" (7-inch version) | Bonnie 'Prince' Billy | Domino RUG246 |
| 2007 | "Lay & Love" / "Señor" / "Going to Acapulco" (12-inch/CD) | Bonnie 'Prince' Billy | Drag City DC329 |
| 2007 | "John the Baptist" / "Strange Form of Life" (7-inch) | Bonnie 'Prince' Billy | Self-released / Tour Only |
| 2007 | "Strange Form of Life" / "The Seedling" | Bonnie 'Prince' Billy | Domino RUG248 |
| 2008 | "Notes For Future Lovers" / "¿Dónde Está Prufrock?" (7-inch) | Bonnie 'Prince' Billy | Gold Robot GRR006 |
| 2009 | "One Day At A Time" (iTunes Digital Single) | Bonnie 'Prince' Billy & the Bewarers | |
| 2009 | "Forever and Ever" / "In Spite of Ourselves" (7-inch) | Bonnie 'Prince' Billy & Susanna | Self-released / Tour Only |
| 2009 | "Stay" / "People Living" (7-inch) | Bonnie 'Prince' Billy | Drag City DC422/ Palace Records PR43 |
| 2010 | "New Year's Eve's The Loneliest Night Of The Year" (split 7-inch with Mike Heron) | Bonnie 'Prince' Billy & Trembling Bells | Honest Johns HJP51 |
| 2011 | "Island Brothers" / "New Wonder" (10-inch) | Bonnie 'Prince' Billy & the Cairo Gang | Drag City DC468 |
| 2011 | "Must Be Blind" / "Life in Muscle" (10-inch) | Bonnie 'Prince' Billy & Matt Sweeney | Drag City DC481 |
| 2011 | "There Is No God" / "God Is Love" (10-inch) | Bonnie 'Prince' Billy | Drag City DC483 |
| 2012 | "I am a Floozy"/"Remember the Terror Time" (book & cd "Afternoon") | Bonnie 'Prince' Billy | Black Tent Press |
| 2012 | "The b-sides for Time To Be Clear" (7-inch) | Bonnie 'Prince' Billy | Drag City DC515 |
| 2012 | "Storms" (split 7-inch with Billy F. Gibbons) | Bonnie 'Prince' Billy & Matt Sweeney | Drag City DC546 |
| 2012 | "Christmas Eve Can Kill You" / "Walking the Dog" (7-inch) | Dawn McCarthy & Bonnie 'Prince' Billy | Drag City DC547 |
| 2013 | "Sixty-One / Sixty Minute Man" (10-inch) | Bonnie 'Prince' Billy | Dogfish Head (brewery); Barcode: 72410124371 |
| 2013 | "That's My Kind of Night" (iTunes Digital Single) | Bonnie 'Prince' Billy | Drag City DC587 |
| 2013 | "Better Than I Used To Be" (iTunes Digital Single) | Bonnie 'Prince' Billy | Drag City DC587 |
| 2013 | "Let Me Love You" (iTunes Digital Single) | Bonnie 'Prince' Billy | Drag City DC587 |
| 2014 | "There Are Worse Things I Could Do" (iTunes Digital Single) | Bonnie 'Prince' Billy | Drag City DC587 |
| 2014 | "Lovin' You Is Fun" (iTunes Digital Single) | Bonnie 'Prince' Billy | Drag City DC587 |
| 2014 | "Die Young" (iTunes Digital Single) | Bonnie 'Prince' Billy | Drag City DC587 |
| 2014 | "Am I Not A Weaker Soldier?" (7-inch) | Alexis Taylor vs. Bonnie 'Prince' Billy | Domino Records RUG629 |
| 2014 | "New Black Rich (Tusks)" (7-inch) | Bonnie 'Prince' Billy | Drag City Records DC609 |
| 2014 | "Quail And Dumplings" (7-inch) | Bonnie 'Prince' Billy | Drag City Records DC608 |
| 2014 | "We Love Our Hole / I'll Be Alright" (7-inch) | Bonnie 'Prince' Billy & The Cairo Gang | Empty Cellar Records EMP022 |
| 2014 | "New Trip On The Old Wine / Lay It Down" (7-inch) | Trembling Bells & Bonnie 'Prince' Billy | Tin Angel Records TARRSD1 |
| 2015 | "Mindlessness" (7-inch) | Bonnie 'Prince' Billy | Drag City Records DC607 |
| 2015 | "The Devil Is People" (12-inch) | "Bonnie Stillwatter" (Will Oldham & Watter) | Temporary Residence Limited |
| 2015 | "Gloria/Drie Vragen" (7-inch) | Bonnie 'Prince' Billy & Broeder Dieleman | Snowstar Records 15-062 |
| 2017 | "Conquer / You Have Been Seen (7-inch) | Bonnie 'Prince' Billy | Slowboy Records BOY 25 |
| 2017 | "Mama Tried" (free digital download) | Bonnie 'Prince' Billy | Drag City Records |
| 2020 | "This Is Far From Over" (digital download) | Bonnie 'Prince' Billy | Domino RUG1116 |
| 2022 | "Niagra" | Fences & Bonnie 'Prince' Billy | |
| 2022 | "Friends of Devil" | Andrew Rinehart and Bonnie ‘Prince’ Billy | |
| 2024 | "Our Home" | Bonnie ‘Prince’ Billy featuring Tim O'Brien | No Quarter |
| 2026 | "They Keep Trying to Find You" | Bonnie ‘Prince’ Billy | Domino/No Quarter |
| 2026 | "Hey Little" | Bonnie ‘Prince’ Billy | Domino/No Quarter |

=== Compilation appearances ===
This section lists Will Oldham songs which have appeared exclusively on multi-artist compilations.

- "For The Mekons, et al." – Palace Brothers (Hey Drag City – Drag City, 1993)
- "Don't I Look Good Today" – Palace Brothers (Louisville Sluggers Vol.3 – Self-Destruct, 1993)
- "Two More Days" – Palace Brothers (Love Is My Only Crime 2 – Veracity/Intercord, 1994)
- "I Am A Cinematographer (Live)" – Palace Brothers (The Drag City Hour – Sea Note, 1996)
- "Meaulnes (Live)" – Palace Brothers (The Drag City Hour – Sea Note, 1996)
- "I Send My Love To You (Live)" – Palace Brothers (The Drag City Hour – Sea Note, 1996)
- "You Will Miss Me When I Burn (Live)" – Palace Brothers (The Drag City Hour – Sea Note, 1996)
- "Little Blue Eyes" (studio version) – Palace (Sourmash: A Louisville Compilation – X-Static/Boss Snake Music, 1996)
- "Ebb's Folly" – Will Oldham and Jim O'Rourke (Dutch Harbor OST – Atavistic, 1997)
- "Blokbuster (Live)" – Live Palace Music (Felidae – Last Exit, 1997)
- "What's Wrong With A Zoo?" – Bonnie 'Prince' Billy (Quelque Chose d'Organique OST – Virgin France, 1998)
- "Watch With Me" – Bonnie 'Prince' Billy (Methods of Intimate Plumbing – Blue Bunny Records, 1999)
- "Song For The New Breed (acoustic)" – Bonnie 'Prince' Billy (Louisvillesonicimprint-Vol. 1 – Ghetto Defendant, 2000)
- "Today I Started Celebrating Again" – Bonnie 'Prince' Billy (At Home With The Groovebox – Grand Royal, 2000)
- "The Eagle and the Hawk" (John Denver) – Bonnie 'Prince' Billy (Take Me Home – Badman Recording Co., 2000)
- "Early Morning Melody" – Bonnie 'Prince' Billy (Shellac presents All Tomorrow's Parties 2.0 – BMI, 2002)
- "You Can Never Go Fast Enough" – Will Oldham and Alan Licht (Don't Cry, Driver – Plain Recordings, 2003)
- "There's Something About What Happens When We Talk" – Bonnie Billy and Mary Feiock (Louisville is for Lovers Vol. 3 – Double Malt, 2003)
- "All These Vicious Dogs" – Will Oldham (All The Real Girls OST – Sanctuary Records/Combustion Music, 2003)
- "Lessons From What's Poor (different version)" – Bonnie 'Prince' Billy (Now Who's Crazy? – Drag City, 2003)
- "Antagonism (live)" – Bonnie 'Prince' Billy (Wide-Awake Crescent-Shaped – CWAS smile, 2004)
- "Demon Lover" – Superwolf (Sprout OST – Brushfire Records, 2005)
- "My Home is the Sea (live)" – Bonnie 'Prince' Billy and Matt Sweeney (Drag City A–Z – Drag City, 2005)
- "Will Oldham Speaks His Peace" – Will Oldham (Sea Note presents Mr. Jews 7-inch – Sea Note, 2005)
- "Song For Doctors Without Borders" – Bonnie 'Prince' Billy (Not Alone – Durtro Jnana, 2006)
- "Monolith Lamb" – Bonnie Billy & Oscar Parsons (Spacemoth 5th Anniversary Compilation 2 – Spacemoth CDr, 2006)
- "Love Is Pleasing" – Bonnie 'Prince' Billy (Louisville Is For Lovers 6 – Double Malt, 2006)
- "Wouldn't It Be Nice" (The Beach Boys) – Oldham Brothers (Do It Again: a Tribute to Pet Sounds – Houston Party Record, 2006)
- "Puff the Magic Dragon" – Bonnie 'Prince' Billy (Songs for the Young at Heart – V2 Records, 2/2007)
- "Get Your Hands Dirty" – Bonnie 'Prince' Billy (Louisville is for Lovers Vol. 8 – Double Malt, 2008)
- "Torn And Brayed" – Bonnie 'Prince' Billy and Matt Sweeney (Palermo Shooting OST, 2008)
- "The Girl in Me" – Bonnie 'Prince' Billy (Louisville is for Lovers Vol. 9 – Double Malt, 2009)
- "New Wedding" – Bonnie 'Prince' Billy (The Present OST – Brushfire, 2009)
- "My Only Friend" (Chris Knox) – Bonnie 'Prince' Billy (Stroke – Songs For Chris Knox – Merge, 2009)
- "Love in the Hot Afternoon" (Gene Watson) – Bonnie 'Prince' Billy & Matt Sweeney (The Adult Swim Singles Program – Adult Swim, 2010)
- "Hombre Sencillo (Simple Man)" (Graham Nash) – Bonnie 'Prince' Billy (Be Yourself: A Tribute to Graham Nash's Songs For Beginners – Grassroots, 2010)
- "All The Trees Of The Field Will Clap Their Hands" (Sufjan Stevens) – Bonnie 'Prince' Billy (Seven Swans Reimagined – On Joyful Wings, 2011)
- "Storms" (Fleetwood Mac) – Bonnie 'Prince' Billy & Matt Sweeney (Just Tell Me That You Want Me: A Tribute to Fleetwood Mac – Hear Music, 2012)
- "Gypsy He-Witch" (Jason Molina) – Bonnie 'Prince' Billy (Weary Engine Blues: A Tribute To Jason Molina – Graveface, 2013)
- "Where's the Playground Susie" (Jimmy Webb) – Bonnie 'Prince' Billy ("Still on the Line: A Tribute to Jimmy Webb" – Flannelgraph, 2015)

== Collaborations ==
=== Albums ===
- Fearful Symmetry – Box of Chocolates (Mad Entropic Carnaval, 1990)
- The Last Place to Go – Boxhead Ensemble (Atavistic, 1998)
- Songs From Robert Louis Stevenson's 'A Child's Garden Of Verses' – The Anomoanon (Palace Records, 2000)
- Greetings from Providence, R.I. – Havanarama (Self-released, 2000)
- Whatever, Mortal – Papa M (Drag City, 2001)
- Tranquil Isolation – Nicolai Dunger (Virgin, 2002)
- Rock The Blockade – Havanarama (Secret Eye, 2003)
- Ala.Cali.Tucky – BrightBlack (Galaxia, 2004)
- No Earthly Man – Alasdair Roberts (Drag City, 2005)
- Safe Inside the Day – Baby Dee (Drag City, 2008)
- Is It The Sea? – Bonnie 'Prince' Billy with Harem Scarem & Alex Neilson (Domino, 2008)
- Silent City – Brian Harnetty & Bonnie 'Prince' Billy (Atavistic, 2009)
- Hello Sorrow, Hello Joy – Three Queens in Mourning / Bonnie 'Prince' Billy (Textile Records, 2020)

=== EPs ===
- Summer Never Ends – The Anomoanon (Palace Records, 1999)
- Fish & Crabs – Havanarama (Self-released, 1999)
- Mutter – Carrie Yury (Self-released, 2005)

=== Songs ===
| Year | Title | Artist | Album | Label |
|---|---|---|---|---|
| 1996 | "Simply Beautiful" | Briana Corrigan | When My Arms Wrap You Round | Eastwest |
| 1996 | "I Put My Arms Out To You (Acoustic)" | Briana Corrigan | Love Me Now | Eastwest |
| 1996 | "More Brother (Inbred Version)" | Ice vs. Palace | Macrodub Infection Vol. 2 | Gyroscope |
| 1996 | "More Brother Dub" | Ice vs. Palace | Organized Sound | Jazz Fudge Recordings |
| 1997 | "Untitled" | The Continental OP | Sounds Of The Geographically Challenged Vol.2 | The Temporary Residence |
| 1997 | "Spotlight" | Rising Shotgun | David Allan Coe's In My Mind 7-inch | Palace Records |
| 1997 | "Tom" | The Anomoanon | Mother Goose | Palace Records |
| 2000 | "I See a Darkness" | Johnny Cash | American III: Solitary Man | American |
| 2001 | "Happy Child" | Tweaker | The Attraction to All Things Uncertain | Six Degrees/Ryko |
| 2002 | "How Can I Tell You I Love You" | Papa M | Sonic Youth presents All Tomorrow's Parties 1.1 | Bearded Music |
| 2002 | "One That Got Away" | The Anomoanon | Asleep Many Years in the Wood | Temporary Residence |
| 2004 | "Valentine" | Bobby Bare Jr.'s Young Criminals Starvation League | From the End of Your Leash | Munich Records |
| 2004 | "Ruby" | Tweaker | 2 a.m. Wakeup Call | iMUSIC/Waxploitation |
| 2005 | "Sea Lion" | Sage Francis | Sea Lion 12-inch | Epitaph |
| 2005 | "Don't Create a Ditch" "He Was A Friend Of Mine" "Nothin' to Celebrate" | Red | Nothin' To Celebrate | Universal Music |
| 2005 | "Gratitude" | Björk | Drawing Restraint 9 | Polydor |
| 2005 | "Punks in the Beerlight" | The Silver Jews | Tanglewood Numbers | Drag City |
| 2006 | "Lowlight" | Wrinkle Neck Mules | Pull The Brake | Shut Eye |
| 2006 | "His Hands" | Candi Staton | His Hands | Honest Jons/Astralwerks |
| 2006 | "Idumæa" | Current 93 | Black Ships Ate the Sky | Durtro Jnana |
| 2006 | "Leave It Behind" | Homesick Hank | Leave It Behind | Playground |
| 2006 | "BTK Blues" "Danny" "Don't Ever Change" | Pink Nasty | Mold the Gold | Self Released |
| 2007 | "Knoxville Girl" | Charlie Louvin | s/t | Tompkins Square |
| 2007 | "Through My Sails" | Soulsavers | It's Not How Far You Fall, It's The Way You Land | V2 |
| 2007 | "Idumæa (live)" | Current 93 | Birdsong in the Empire | Durtro Jnana |
| 2007 | "La Chambre" | Soy Un Caballo | Les Heures De Raison | Matamore |
| 2007 | "Evolution of Waters" "Kin" | Valgeir Sigurdsson | Ekvilibrium | Bedroom Community |
| 2007 | "Do You Want to be Buried With My People" "Kiss" "River of No Return" "Comfort You" | Scout Niblett | This Fool Can Now Die | Too Pure |
| 2008 | "Unlit Hallway" "Like the River" | Sun Kil Moon | April | Caldo Verde |
| 2008 | "Bury the Ghost" | Dosh | Wolves and Wishes | anticon. |
| 2008 | "Would You?" | Holly Throsby | A Loud Call | Spunk |
| 2009 | "Sunrise" | Soulsavers | Broken | V2 / Cooperative Music. |

== Tributes ==
- Johnny Cash recorded a version of "I See a Darkness" on his American Recordings disc American III: Solitary Man (2000). Oldham provided backing vocals.
- Half Man Half Biscuit mention both the Palace Brothers and Bonnie 'Prince' Billy in the song "Emerging From Gorse" on their Trouble Over Bridgwater album (2000).
- "Harm of Will" from Björk's Vespertine album (2001) is about, and named after, Will Oldham.
- Oldham was the subject of a 2004 30-track double-CD tribute album (and a smaller 18-track version) released on Tract Records, titled I Am a Cold Rock. I Am Dull Grass., The album features performances by Calexico, Jolie Holland, Sodastream, and Iron & Wine, among others.
- Jeffrey Lewis's album City and Eastern Songs (2005) included the track "Williamsburg Will Oldham Horror."
- Steve Adey also covered "I See a Darkness" on his LP All Things Real (2006).
- Scottish rock group Biffy Clyro mentioned Oldham in their song "Saturday Superhouse" from their album Puzzle (2007).
- Mark Kozelek recorded a version of Oldham's "New Partner" on his 2008 disc, The Finally LP.
- In 2009 Mark Lanegan and Soulsavers recorded a cover version of "You Will Miss Me When I Burn." The release is a split single, backed with the Lanegan-penned "Sunrise" featuring vocals by Oldham.
- In 2017, the Spanish superstar Rosalía (singer) made a flamenco cover of "I See a Darkness" in her album Los ángeles (album).
