= Lost Blues and Other Songs =

Compilation album by Palace Music
- Released: 31 March 1997
- Genre: Alt-Country
- Label: Drag City

Professional ratings
Review scores
Source	Rating
AllMusic	4.5/5 stars
NME	7/10
Uncut	4/5 stars

Lost Blues and Other Songs by Palace Music is a compilation of singles, rarities, and live tracks recorded by Will Oldham under various permutations of the Palace name from 1993 to 1997. The compilation was followed by Guarapero/Lost Blues 2 (2000) and Little Lost Blues (2006).

"Ohio River Boat Song" is an adaptation of the traditional Scottish "Loch Tay Boat Song." "Horses" was originally written and performed by Sally Timms of the Mekons on her 1988 solo album Somebody's Rockin' My Dreamboat.

== Track listing ==
1. "Ohio River Boat Song"
2. "Riding" (previously released on There Is No-One What Will Take Care of You)
3. "Valentine's Day"
4. "Trudy Dies" (previously released on An Arrow Through the Bitch)
5. "Come In" (previously released on An Arrow Through the Bitch)
6. "Little Blue Eyes"
7. "Horses" (previously released on An Arrow Through the Bitch)
8. "Stable Will" (previously released on An Arrow Through the Bitch)
9. "Untitled" (Live at the Lounge Ax November 17, 1994)
10. "O How I Enjoy the Light"
11. "Marriage"
12. "West Palm Beach" (previously released on The Mountain)
13. "Gulf Shores" (previously released on The Mountain)
14. "(End Of) Traveling" (previously released on The Mountain)
15. "Lost Blues"
