= Sings Greatest Palace Music =

Studio album by Bonnie "Prince" Billy
- Released: March 23, 2004
- Genre: Alternative country
- Length: 58:03
- Label: Drag City
- Producer: Mark Nevers, Will Oldham

Bonnie "Prince" Billy chronology
Master and Everyone (2003)	Sings Greatest Palace Music (2004)	Superwolf (2005)

Professional ratings
Review scores
Source	Rating
AllMusic	3.5/5 stars
BBC Music	mixed
The Guardian	5/5 stars
Pitchfork	5.0/10
PopMatters	mixed

Bonnie "Prince" Billy Sings Greatest Palace Music is a 2004 studio album by Bonnie "Prince" Billy. It features new recordings of songs from his Palace Music era (1993–1997), recorded in Nashville, Tennessee, with a large group of country session musicians. Guest musicians include Eddie Bayers, Stuart Duncan, Mark Fain, Mike Johnson, Hargus "Pig" Robbins, Andrew Bird and Bruce Watkins.

== Track listing ==
No.	Title	Original version from	Length
1.	"New Partner"	Viva Last Blues	4:31
2.	"Ohio River Boat Song"	"Ohio River Boat Song"	2:54
3.	"Gulf Shores"	"West Palm Beach"	3:54
4.	"You Will Miss Me When I Burn"	Days in the Wake	4:08
5.	"The Brute Choir"	Viva Last Blues	3:41
6.	"I Send My Love to You"	Days in the Wake	2:28
7.	"More Brother Rides"	Viva Last Blues	3:04
8.	"Agnes, Queen of Sorrow"	Hope	3:13
9.	"Viva Ultra"	Viva Last Blues	3:56
10.	"Pushkin"	Days in the Wake	4:01
11.	"Horses"	"Horses"	3:45
12.	"Riding"	There Is No-One What Will Take Care of You	3:42
13.	"West Palm Beach"	"West Palm Beach"	4:03
14.	"No More Workhorse Blues"	Days in the Wake	2:56
15.	"I Am a Cinematographer"	Days in the Wake	7:44

== Personnel ==
Credits adapted from liner notes.

- Hargus "Pig" Robbins – piano
- Colin Gagon – accordion, trombone
- Tony Crow – keyboards, synthesizer
- Mark Fain – bass guitar
- Matt Sweeney – electric guitar
- Aram Stith – electric guitar
- Dave Bird – electric guitar
- Ned Oldham – electric guitar
- Bruce Watkins – acoustic guitar
- Mike Johnson – pedal steel guitar
- Stuart Duncan – fiddle, mandolin
- Andrew Bird – strings, glockenspiel, fiddle
- D.V. DeVincentis – saxophone
- Jack Carneal – percussion
- Eddie Bayers – drums

== Charts ==
Chart	Peak position
Belgian Albums (Ultratop Flanders)	90
UK Albums (OCC)	63
