= Wai Notes =

Studio album (demo) by Bonnie 'Prince' Billy and Dawn McCarthy
- Released: February 2007
- Label: Drag City
- Producer: Valgeir Sigurðsson

Professional ratings
Review scores
Source	Rating
Pitchfork Media	(6.2/10)

Wai Notes is a 2007 album by Dawn McCarthy and Bonnie 'Prince' Billy, credited here as Bonny Billy. It is a collection of demo songs for The Letting Go. The album comprises recordings on tapes exchanged between Will Oldham and Dawn McCarthy through the mail prior to recording The Letting Go. Only 10,000 copies were duplicated.

== Track listing ==
1. "Then The Letting Go" – 4:28
2. "Strange Form of Life" – 2:31
3. "Lay & Love" – 3:38
4. "God Is Love" – 4:15
5. "The Signifying Wolf" – 2:45
6. "The Seedling" – 2:56
7. "I Called You Back" – 5:14
8. "Wai" - 3:13
9. "Cursed Sleep" – 4:31
10. "God's Small Song" – 2:54

== Personnel ==
- Dawn McCarthy – singing
