= Ask Forgiveness =

EP by Bonnie 'Prince' Billy
- Released: 19 November 2007
- Genre: Folk rock, alternative country
- Label: Drag City (US); Domino (UK)

Bonnie 'Prince' Billy chronology
The Letting Go (2006)	Ask Forgiveness (2007)	Lie Down in the Light (2008)

Professional ratings
Review scores
Source	Rating
AllMusic	3.5/5 stars
Pitchfork	7.6/10

Ask Forgiveness is a 2007 EP by Bonnie 'Prince' Billy, released in the UK on 19 November 2007 and in the US on 20 November 2007. It is a collection of covers, with the exception of one original song by Oldham.

== Track listing ==
1. "I Came to Hear the Music" (Mickey Newbury)
2. "I've Seen It All" (Björk, Sjón, Lars von Trier)
3. "Am I Demon" (Glenn Danzig)
4. "My Life" (Phil Ochs)
5. "I'm Loving the Street" (Will Oldham)
6. "The Way I Am" (Sonny Throckmorton)
7. "Cycles" (Gayle Caldwell)
8. "The World's Greatest" (R. Kelly)

== Personnel ==
- Meg Baird
- Greg Weeks
- Maggie Wienk – cello
