= Robert Arellano =

American writer, musician and educator (born 1969)

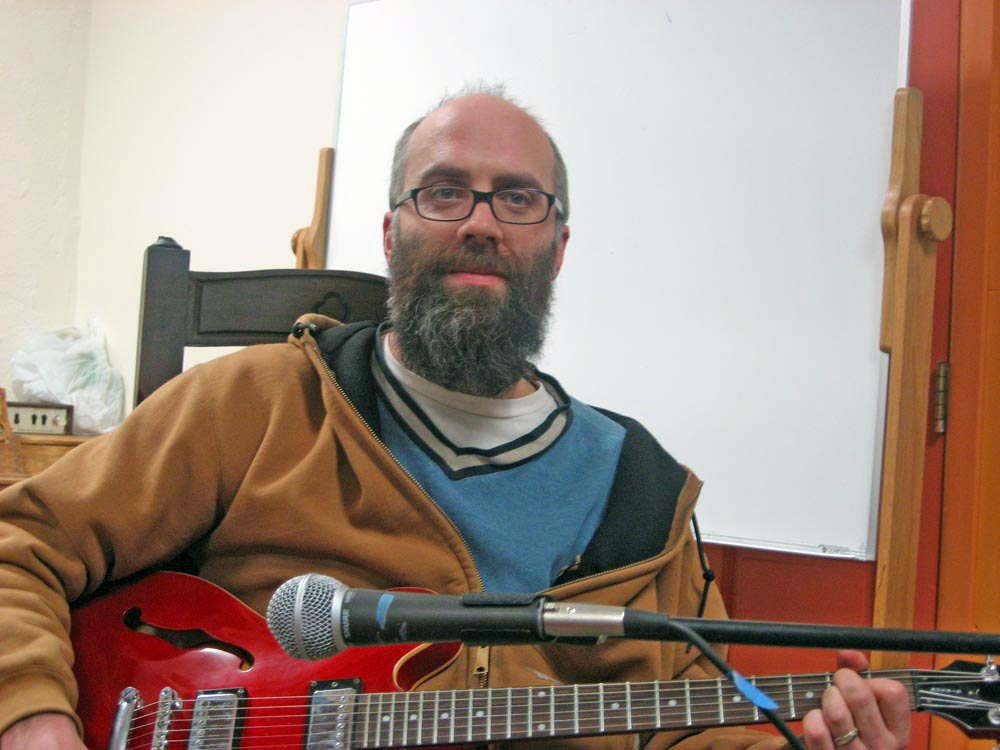
- Arellano, live on KLDK
- Born: July 12, 1969 (age 57)
- Other name: Bob Arellano
- Education: Brown University
- Occupations: Author; musician; educator
- Employer: Brown University
- Organization(s): Electronic Literature Organization; Center for Emerging Media and Digital Arts, Southern Oregon University
- Known for: The Internet's first hyperzine, LSD-50; the World Wide Web's first hypertext novel, Sunshine ’69; international music exchanges with Cuba; guitarist with Will Oldham

Robert Arellano (born July 12, 1969) is an American writer, musician and educator from Talent, Oregon. His literary production includes pioneering work in electronic publishing, graphic-novel editions for Soft Skull Press/Counterpoint, and five novels published by Akashic Books. His guitar-playing for Bonnie 'Prince' Billy is featured on 'I See a Darkness', which Pitchfork magazine named one of the Top 10 albums of the 1990s, and since the 1980s he has been writing and recording songs for solo projects and his group Havanarama.

== Life ==
Arellano was born in 1969 and raised in Summit, New Jersey. He is a first generation American of Cuban descent. After earning both Bachelor (1991) and Masters (1994) degrees from Brown University, he taught for a decade on Brown's Literary Arts faculty. In 1993 he used Storyspace to publish the Internet's first hyperzine, LSD-50, on a Gopher server. In 1996, Sonicnet serialized his groundbreaking hypertext novel Sunshine ’69 on the World Wide Web. Arellano is a founding member of the Literary Advisory Board of the Electronic Literature Organization and founding director of the Center for Emerging Media and Digital Arts at Southern Oregon University. He has been awarded the Oregon Literary Fellowship in Fiction (2014) and a Rockefeller Foundation Literary Arts Fellowship (2016).

His most recent novel, Havana Libre, about the 1997 terrorist bombings of tourist destinations in Cuba, was published by Akashic Books in 2017. In 2012, Akashic published his novel Curse the Names about a reporter living and working in Los Alamos, New Mexico; and in 2010 his novel Havana Lunar was a finalist for an Edgar Allan Poe Award, nominated by the Mystery Writers of America."He has published fiction and essays in Jane, The Believer, Tin House, and The Village Voice."

Havana Libre is a standalone sequel to Havana Lunar and follows Dr. Mano Rodriguez, a Cuban doctor sent undercover to Miami in 1997 to find who is sponsoring a series of bombings in Havana. His nonfiction book Friki: Rock and Rebellion in the Cuban Revolution was released in 2018.

Arellano lived for seven years in Dixon, New Mexico, and teaches in the College of Arts & Sciences at Southern Oregon University.

== Cuban heritage and themes ==
Arellano's parents left Cuba in the early 1960s, and he has described feeling like a "Miami Cuban" despite being born in New Jersey. He first traveled to Cuba in 1992 on a Brown University student exchange, a trip his parents initially opposed. The protagonist of Havana Lunar and Havana Libre, Mano Rodriguez has been characterized as a semi-autobiographical figure representing what Arellano's life might have been had his family never left the island.

== Works ==
- As Bobby Rabyd, LSD-50 (1993)
- As Bobby Rabyd, Sunshine 69 (1996)

the World Wide Web's first interactive novel, Sunshine 69

- Fast Eddie: King of the Bees (2001) ISBN 978-1-888451-22-1
- As Eddy Arellano, Dead in Desemboque: Historias de Amor y Sangre! (2008) ISBN 978-0-9796636-4-2

collaboration with artists William Schaff, Richard Schuler, and Alec Thibodeau on a graphic-novel tribute to Mexican comic books

- Don Dimaio of La Plata (2004), ISBN 978-1-888451-51-1

Nominated for a 2010 Edgar Award by the Mystery Writers of America,

- Curse the Names, (2012) ISBN 978-1-61775-030-4
- Havana Libre, (2017) ISBN 978-1-61775-583-5
- Havana Lunar (2009)
- Friki: Rock and Rebellion in the Cuban Revolution (2018)

== Reception ==
Don Dimaio of La Plata (2004), part of Akashic's Urban Surreal series, is a satire of a corrupt American mayor which Library Journal described as based on an actual mayoral term in Providence, Rhode Island.

Kirkus Reviews praised Havana Libre for its atmosphere and political critique but found that these elements were not fully integrated into the story. The reviewer also thought the book's climax was somewhat rushed.

== Music ==
As Bob Arellano, he has played guitar with Will Oldham (a.k.a. Bonnie 'Prince' Billy) on the albums I See a Darkness, More Revery, and Joya as well as in performance and on recordings with Papa M (David Pajo), Jodie Jean Marston, the Pathetics and Havanarama. In March 2000, Arellano organized an international music exchange in Havana and Pinar del Rio, Cuba called "Rock the Blockade" featuring Cuban performers in concert with Will Oldham, Papa M, Speed to Roam, and Havanarama.

== See also ==
- List of electronic literature authors, critics, and works
- E-book#History
- Electronic literature
- Hypertext fiction
- Interactive fiction
- Literatronica
