= The Needles (band) =

- Origin: Aberdeen, Scotland
- Genres: Punk / Rock
- Label: Dangerous Records
- Past members: Dave Dixon, Paul Curtiss, Richey Wolfe, Johnny Wolfe, Sandy 'Future' Galloway, Mike Duguid, Scott Lyon, Alpha Mitchell and Mike Hyland

The Needles were a Scottish four-piece band, who formed in their mid-teens in late 1990s in Aberdeen, Scotland, relocating to Glasgow in 2001. Influenced heavily by 1960s garage punk and late 1970s new wave/powerpop, their first limited-edition single on newly formed indie label Lithium Records sold out within weeks of its release, and the follow-up "We Got the Soul" continued the momentum, garnering positive notices in the Melody Maker and NME, as well as airplay on Radio 1's Evening Session.

Various delays and false dawns followed, and although they continued to release records for a good few years afterwards, switching to the better-funded Dangerous Records in 2002, this early momentum was never truly regained, although their last three singles, "Dianne", "Summer Girls" and "Girl I Used to Know", received a degree of exposure on MTV2, Radio 1, and XFM.

The band finally split to pursue new projects in 2007, with Dave, Paul, and John going on to form the Hidden Masters with Nic Denholm (ex-Owsley Sunshine/Uncle John & Whitelock) and former Bangtwister bassist Alpha Mitchell. The Hidden Masters went on to record an album entitled 'Of This And Other Worlds' for Rise Above/Metal Blade Records and perform backing vocals on Trembling Bells and Bonnie Prince Billy's 2012 album The Marble Downs. Singer Dave Dixon later went on to front The Shiverin' Sheiks, who released the debut single 'Guided Missiles' on BrewDog Records in 2013, while bassist Paul Curtiss (née Milne) formed London-based psychedelic pop band The Magnetic Mind, which released the 7" single 'Maybe the Stars, Maybe the Sun' on Heavy Soul Records in 2012.

The Needles recorded several sessions for the BBC, most notably for the Mark Lamarr show on BBC Radio 2 in 2006, and played their last gig with the original line-up at the South by Southwest music festival in Texas in 2007, before finally calling it a day later that year.

== Discography ==
=== Albums ===
- In Search of The Needles (2007)
- Richie and the Magic Hammond on Lithium records Vol. 2 (2000)
- Any Other Girl on Lithium records Vol. 1 (1999)

=== EPs and singles ===
- "Girl I Used to Know" 7"/CD (2007)
- "Summer Girls" 7"/CD (2006)
- "Dianne" 7"/CD (2006)
- 1,2,3..5 EP (2005)
- Under The City EP (2004)
- The King and the Queen of Style EP (2002)
- "Let You Down" 7"(2001)
- Beat of the City EP (BBC sessions, 1999)
- We Got the Soul EP(1999)
- Teenage Bomb EP (1998)
