= The Broken Giant =

1997 film

- Directed by: Estep Nagy
- Written by: Estep Nagy
- Starring: John Glover; Brooke Smith; Will Arnett; Chris Noth; Missy Yager
- Release date: 1997
- Country: United States
- Language: English

The Broken Giant is a 1997 American drama film written and directed by Estep Nagy, and starring John Glover, Brooke Smith and Will Arnett. It is meditative in style, with long silences and highly composed photography. The film was acquired by the permanent collection of the Museum of Modern Art in 2000. The soundtrack was released as Songs Put Together For (The Broken Giant) by Will Oldham.

== Plot ==
A young minister in a small town gives sanctuary at his church to a girl who mysteriously arrives out of breath and apparently running from something, or somebody.
