= Guarapero/Lost Blues 2 =

Compilation album by Will Oldham
- Released: 21 February 2000
- Label: Drag City

Professional ratings
Review scores
Source	Rating
AllMusic	3/5 stars
Pitchfork Media	6.8/10

Guarapero/Lost Blues 2 is an album by Will Oldham, released in 2000. It is his second compilation of singles, rarities, and live performances, after Lost Blues and Other Songs (1997). A third Oldham compilation, Little Lost Blues, was released in 2006.

The lyrics of "The Risen Lord," an alternative version of which appeared on the 2004 EP Black/Rich Music, are taken from a poem by D. H. Lawrence. "Big Balls" is a version of a song by AC/DC (with lyrics rewritten by Oldham), and "Every Mother's Son" was originally performed by Lynyrd Skynyrd.

== Track listing ==
1. "Drinking Woman"
2. "The Spider’s Dude Is Often There" (Peel session 27/11/93)
3. "Gezundheit"
4. "Let the Wires Ring"
5. "Big Balls"
6. "For the Mekons et al." (live at the Lounge Ax 17/11/94)
7. "Stable Will" (live at the Lounge Ax 17/11/94)
8. "Every Mother’s Son"
9. "No More Rides"
10. "The Risen Lord" (unreleased single version)
11. "Boy, Have You Cum" (unreleased single version)
12. "Patience"
13. "Take However Long You Want"
14. "Sugarcane Juice Drinker" (unreleased track from Joya sessions)
15. "Call Me a Liar" (unreleased track from Joya sessions)
16. "O Lord Are You in Need" (Peel session 07/07/95)

=== BONUS TRACK ===
"Apocolypse, No! (alternate take)" is track "0" on the CD (in the Pregap) and last track of side 4 of vinyl version
