= Western music =

Western music may refer to:

- Western culture § Music, especially:
  - Western classical music
- Western music (North America), a form of country music from the Western United States and Old West, including:
  - New Mexico music
  - Red Dirt (music)
  - Tejano music
  - Texas country music
  - Western swing
- West Coast blues, USA
- Western Music (EP), a Will Oldham EP
