= Little Lost Blues =

Compilation album by Bonny Billy
- Released: 19 September 2006
- Recorded: 1998–2006
- Genre: Alt-Country
- Label: Drag City

Bonny Billy chronology
The Letting Go (2006)	Little Lost Blues (2006)

Little Lost Blues by Bonny Billy is the third compilation of singles and rarities by Will Oldham. The previous two were Lost Blues and Other Songs (1997) and Guarapero/Lost Blues 2 (2000). It was offered as a limited edition bonus disc with some copies of The Letting Go LP and CD.

"Little Boy Blue" is a George Jones cover, "I Confess" is a Kevin Coyne cover, and "Less of Me" is a Glen Campbell cover. "His Hands" is Oldham's demo version of a song he wrote for Candi Staton, released on her album of the same name.

== Track listing ==
1. "Little Boy Blue"
2. "His Hands"
3. "Black Dissimulation"
4. "Southside of the World"
5. "I Confess"
6. "Less of Me"
7. "Barcelona"
8. "Let's Start a Family (Blacks)"
9. "Little Boy Blue 2"
10. "I Am Drinking Again"
11. "Crying in the Chapel"
