= Dream of a Drunk Black Southern Eagle =

EP by Bonnie 'Prince' Billy
- Released: 1999
- Length: 20:27
- Label: Domino/Labels VISA; 4562 (CDs)

Bonnie 'Prince' Billy chronology
Blue Lotus Feet (1998)	Dream of a Drunk Black Southern Eagle (1999)	Ode Music (2000)

Dream of a Drunk Black Southern Eagle is the name of a Bonnie 'Prince' Billy EP released in 1999 as a free item for subscribers of the French daily newspaper Libération. It contains two singles previously released in the U.S. in 1998: "One with the Birds" / "Southside of the World" and "I Am Drinking Again" / "Dreaming My Dreams". The fifth track, "Song for the New Breed (orchestral)", is an alternate recording of "Song for the New Breed", which originally appeared on Bonnie 'Prince' Billy's I See a Darkness album in 1999. This version is exclusive to this release.

== Track listing ==
1. "One with the Birds" – 5:13
2. "Southside of the World" – 3:04
3. "I Am Drinking Again" – 5:32
4. "Dreaming My Dreams" – 3:21
5. "Song for the New Breed (orchestral)" - 3:17
