= Cheyenne Marie Mize =

American singer-songwriter

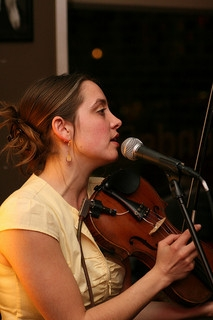
- Cheyenne Marie Mize performing in 2010

Background information
- Genres: Singer-songwriter, folk rock
- Instruments: Vocals, violin, guitar, piano
- Label: SonaBLAST! Records

Cheyenne Marie Mize is an American folk singer-songwriter from Louisville, Kentucky.

== Biography ==
Mize's Before Lately album was released in 2010 on sonaBLAST! Records as an introspective, meditative affair followed by the We Don't Need EP in 2011 featuring more dynamic moods and experimentation. Her music has been described by The New York Times as "tough, dreamy, cloudy-sky country and chamber pop," with a "rare voice, sweet without being cloying, and weary without hopelessness." NPR described Mize in All Songs Considered as "lovely – very much in that Sharon Van Etten, smoky, pretty folk realm. It was just beautiful."

Mize is also associated with acts Ben Sollee and Daniel Martin Moore and Jim James of My Morning Jacket with their Appalachian Voices tour in support of the Dear Companion album – their collaborative Sub Pop release in early 2010. Subsequently, they performed at Austin's South By Southwest festival where Cheyenne Marie Mize was chosen as one of NPR's 10 "Discoveries at SXSW 2011". Mize also collaborated with Bonnie Prince Billy in a 10" release Among the Gold which featured takes on a variety of late 19th century American parlor songs.

Mize is also a member of the folk trio known as Maiden Radio along with Joan Shelley and Julia Purcell. Their full-length album, Wolvering, was released on June 16, 2015, through OK Recordings.

== Discography ==
=== Studio albums ===
- Before Lately (sonaBLAST! Records), October 2010
- Among the Grey (Yep Roc Records), June 2013

=== EPs ===
- We Don't Need, November 2011

=== Collaborations ===
- Among the Gold with Bonnie Prince Billy, April 2009
- Wolvering with Maiden Radio, June 2015
