= Blue Lotus Feet =

EP by Bonnie 'Prince' Billy
- Released: October 19, 1998
- Length: 13:59
- Label: Domino; RUG81 (UK, CDs)

Bonnie 'Prince' Billy chronology
Western Music (1997)	Blue Lotus Feet (1998)	Dream of a Drunk Black Southern Eagle (1999)

Blue Lotus Feet is the name of a Bonnie 'Prince' Billy EP released on UK record label Domino Records in 1998. It consists of the "One with the Birds" / "Southside of the World" single (previously released on Palace Records in the U.S. the same year), as well as five mantras (cosmic chants), first performed live by Oldham during a session for VPRO's "De Avonden" broadcast on Dutch radio on 15 October 1998. The English translation of the mantras is taken from "Cosmic Chants" by Paramahansa Yogananda, as originally sung and recorded by the Monks Of The Self-Realization Order.

== Track listing ==
1. "One with the Birds" – 5:13
2. "Southside of the World" – 3:04
3. "When Thy Song Flows Through Me" – 2:29
4. "I Am the Sky" – 0:53
5. "Blue Lotus Feet" - 1:14
6. "Polestar of My Life" - 0:22
7. "Door of My Heart" - 0:44
