= Songs Put Together For (The Broken Giant) =

EP by Palace
- Released: 1996
- Label: Drag City; DC100

Palace chronology
The Mountain (1994)	Songs Put Together For (The Broken Giant) (1996)	Western Music (1997)

Black/Rich Music
- Will Oldham

Songs Put Together For (The Broken Giant) by Palace is a CD EP released in 1996, on Drag City Records, and is the soundtrack for the 1997 film The Broken Giant, directed by Estep Nagy.

The EP was reissued as Black/Rich Music by Will Oldham on June 22, 1998, on CD and 12" vinyl.

== Track listing ==
1. "Organ: Watch With Me" (retitled "Organ: Do What You Will Do" on Black/Rich Music)
2. "Do What You Will Do"
3. "The Risen Lord"
4. "Organ: Allowance"
5. "Allowance"
6. "Black/Rich Tune"
7. "Organ: Black/Rich"
8. "Guitar: Do What You Will Do"
