= KLDK-LP =

Coordinates: 36.208°N 105.901°W

- Dixon, New Mexico; United States
- Broadcast area: Embudo River Valley
- Frequency: 96.5 (MHz)
- Branding: 96.5 KLDK

Programming
- Format: Community radio

Ownership
- Owner: Embudo Valley Community Library

History
- Call sign meaning: "El Dique" (pronounced L-D-K) is a local Spanish slang name for Dixon

Technical information
- Licensing authority: FCC
- Class: L1
- ERP: 100 watts
- HAAT: -21.7 meters

Links
- Public license information: LMS
- Website: KLDK-LP website

KLDK is a low-power radio station ("96.5 on your FM dial") located in Dixon, New Mexico. KLDK is run entirely by a volunteer staff and is funded primarily through fund-raisers. KLDK's license is held by the Embudo Valley Library. On December 20, 2005, KLDK completed its first year of broadcasting. KLDK features a wide variety of Spanish and Anglo programming.

KLDK also frequently features out-of-town guest DJs such as Lola from Lafayette, Indiana.

A new addition to the KLDK lineup is local business leader Michael Gemetta, general manager of Michael's MiniMart in Velarde.

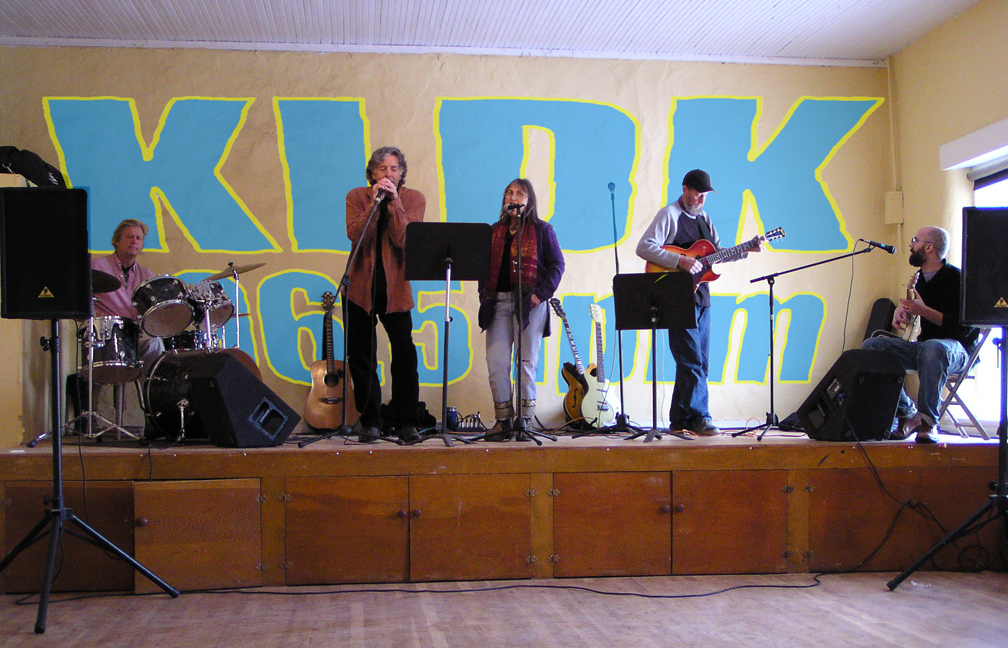
The Pathetics (L-R, OMAR, Father Flim Flam, Selma Harwell, Roger Chilton, Robert Arellano) performing at a KLDK benefit for the Embudo Valley Community Library, Jan 14, 2007

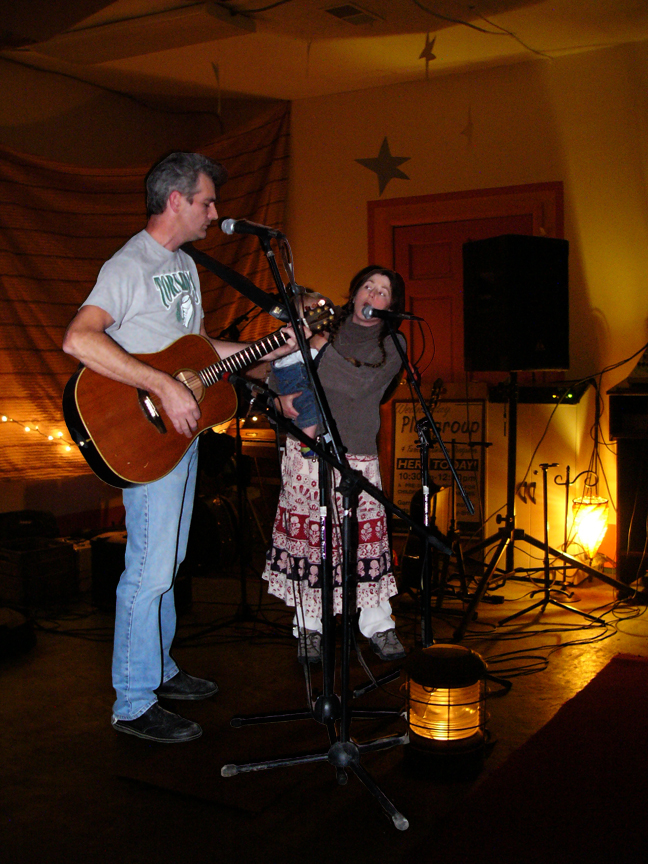
Jody & Clark (and David) playing a KLDK benefit, April 21, 2007

== See also ==
- List of radio stations in New Mexico
