= Among the Gold =

Among The Gold

EP by Bonnie 'Prince' Billy and Cheyenne Marie Mize
- Released: 19 May 2009
- Length: 21:28
- Label: Karate Body Records

Among The Gold is a six-track EP by Will Oldham (as Bonnie "Prince" Billy) and Cheyenne Marie Mize of the band Arnett Hollow. It features the duo's renditions of six classic American parlor songs which were originally written between 1864 and 1915. Mize plays the instruments while Oldham provides vocals.

Among the Gold was released in multiple colours on vinyl and as a digital download on May 19, 2009 by Junket Boy and Karate Body Records.

== Track listing ==
1. "Only A Dream" (1909 by Lincoln/Craff Jr.)
2. "Love's Old Sweet Song" (1914 by Moloy/Bingham)
3. "Beautiful Dreamer" (1864 by Foster)
4. "Kiss Me Again" (1915 by Herbert/Blossom)
5. "Let Me Call You Sweetheart" (1910 by Friedman/Whitson)
6. "Silver Threads Among The Gold" (1873 by Danks/Rexfo)

== Personnel ==
- Cheyenne Marie Mize – guitar, autoharp, violin, vocals
- Will Oldham – vocals

== External links / References ==
- https://web.archive.org/web/20090225211344/http://www.karatebodyrecords.com/among-the-gold/[]
- http://digital.thinkindie.com/
