= Ode Music =

Studio album by Will Oldham
- Released: January 18, 2000
- Length: 33:42
- Label: Drag City; DC183 (CDs)

Will Oldham chronology
Dream of a Drunk Black Southern Eagle (1999)	Ode Music (2000)	More Revery (2000)

Professional ratings
Review scores
Source	Rating
AllMusic	2.5/5 stars
NME	7/10
Pitchfork	5.8/10

Ode Music is a Will Oldham LP released in 2000. It serves as the soundtrack to the film Ode, directed by Kelly Reichardt. The LP is entirely instrumental, featuring primarily acoustic guitar, piano, and organ.

The album's cover art was created by film director Todd Haynes.

== Track listing ==
1. "Ode #1" – 7:41
2. "Ode #2" – 4:07
3. "Ode #3" – 2:03
4. "Ode #4" – 3:19
5. "Ode #1a" - 2:51
6. "Ode #1b" - 3:31
7. "Ode #2a" - 2:33
8. "Ode #5" - 2:40
9. "Ode #3a" - 1:56
10. "Ode #4a" - 3:01
