= Summer in the Southeast =

Live album by Bonnie 'Prince' Billy
- Released: 15 November 2005
- Genre: Alternative country, folk
- Label: Drag City

Professional ratings
Aggregate scores
Source	Rating
Metacritic	73/100
Review scores
Source	Rating
AllMusic	4/5 stars
Pitchfork Media	(7.1/10)

Summer in the Southeast is the first live album by singer-songwriter Bonnie 'Prince' Billy (Will Oldham). It was released in 2005 on Drag City.

== Track listing ==
1. "Master and Everyone" - 3:40
2. "Pushkin" - 4:15
3. "Blokbuster" - 4:19
4. "Wolf Among Wolves" - 3:56
5. "May It Always Be" - 3:03
6. "Break of Day" - 5:16
7. "A Sucker's Evening" - 4:00
8. "Nomadic Revery" - 3:16
9. "I See a Darkness" - 4:29
10. "O Let It Be" - 4:02
11. "Beast for Thee" - 4:13
12. "Death to Everyone" - 5:45
13. "Even If Love" - 2:58
14. "I Send My Love to You" - 2:19
15. "Take However Long You Want" - 4:00
16. "Madeleine Mary" - 4:01
17. "Ease Down the Road" - 4:22
