= Seafarers Music =

EP by Will Oldham
- Released: February 24, 2004
- Length: 27:15
- Label: Drag City; DC261CD (CDs)

Will Oldham chronology
More Revery (2000)	Seafarers Music (2004)	Strange Form of Life (2007)

Professional ratings
Review scores
Source	Rating
Allmusic	link
Pitchfork Media	8/10 link

Seafarers Music is a Will Oldham EP released in 2004. It is the soundtrack to the film Seafarers (2004) by British director Jason Massot, a documentary about four seamen in Rotterdam, Netherlands. Each of the album's tracks is named after one of the four sailors. The EP also features playing from Paul Oldham and David Bird.

== Track listing ==
1. "Sapele" – 4:49
2. "Lars" – 8:20
3. "Bogo" – 8:30
4. "Emmanuel" – 5:36
