= The Phantom Family Halo =

American indie rock band

- Origin: Louisville, KY, USA
- Genres: Experimental, Psychedelic, Indie music
- Years active: 2007–present
- Label: Knitting Factory Records
- Members: Dominic Cipolla, David Lackner, Ben Lord, Christian Lee
- Past members: Michael McMahan, Corey Smith, Tony Bailey, Axel Cooper, Neal Arghabright, Alan the Egyptian, Stephen Shoemaker, William Benton
- Website: knittingfactoryrecords.com/artists/phantom-family-halo

The Phantom Family Halo is an American indie rock band from Louisville in Kentucky notable for music described as having a "post-metal state of ungodly loudness" while managing to achieve a "neat creepy B-movie horror feel." The six-member band, currently based in Brooklyn, has performed with bands such as Black Angels, Black Mountain, Dead Meadow, USAisamonster, Hawkwind, Slint, Damo Suzuki, Acid Mothers Guru Guru, Stormtrippers, Russian Circles, Young Widows, Sapat, The For Carnation, and Bonnie "Prince" Billy. The band signed a recording contract with Knitting Factory Records in 2011.

== Louisville beginnings ==
Band members include Michael McMahan, who also plays with the Louisville band Slint, and Dominic Cipolla of Sapat. They frequently collaborated with other musicians active in the Louisville music scene. In 2009, the group released a double LP entitled Monoliths & These Flowers Never Die on Karate Body Records. In 2010, the band performed in Louisville's Cropped Out Festival. A report in Twin Cities Music in Minneapolis described one of the band's live performances:

They opened with a fade-in chant, and oscillated between hippie-with-a-knife and palms-up rock, their sound amalgamated from Clinic and/or Suicide and/or the "lovely" lo-fi four-tracked trend sweeping the nation and/or psych bands with modern gear.

Band member Cipolla described his relation to music:

Music is therapy for everything in my life, so I only hope to achieve a even closer relationship with it. It's like a book of potions, learning how to conjure up all kinds of different spells.

— Dominic Cipolla, November 2009 in The Courier-Journal

In 2011 the band recorded songs with Bonnie Prince Billy and included them on their album The Mindeater. The release date for Mindeater was set for September 27, 2011.

== Music reviews ==
A review in The Guardian described the band as a "new heavy psych band" which "dwells in a post-metal state of ungodly loudness," and compared their music to Tonys McPhee and Iommi. Prefix Magazine described the upcoming Mindeater album as "spooked-out country" similar to the Palace Brothers using a "downcast slide guitar motif" with singing described as a "cracked vocal delivery" which was "mired in murky lo-fi production values." Reviewer Nick Neyland added that one song has a "neat creepy B-movie horror feel." A review by John Zeiss in Prefix Magazine described the band's sound as psychedelic rock and compared it to bands such as Scott Walker and 13th Floor Elevators. Reviewer Joel Hunt described the band as "inventive." A review in Brooklyn Rocks described the 2LP Monoliths & These Flowers Never Die as a "brain-melting slab of acid rock" similar to Hawkwind and Spacemen 3.

== Discography ==
- "Raven Town Witch" (Sophomore Lounge Records) 2014
- "Francis Jewel Don't Be Afraid Of The Jungle" (Galtta Media) 2013
- "When I Fall Out" Knitting Factory Records 2011
- The Mindeater (with Bonnie 'Prince' Billy)(vinyl on Sophomore Lounge Records, CD and digital on Knitting Factory Records) 2011
- Music From Italian TV (Sophomore Lounge Records) 2010
- Hurricane Fighter Plane split 7inch /Meah (Sophomore Lounge Records) 2009
- Monoliths & These Flowers Never Die, 2009, Karate Body Records
- The Legend Of Black Six (blackvelvetfuckeree records) 2006
