= Like the River Loves the Sea =

Studio album by Joan Shelley
- Released: August 30, 2019
- Recorded: 2018–2019
- Studios: Greenhouse Studios; Iðnó cultural center (Reykjavík)
- Genres: Country; folk
- Length: 38:46
- Label: No Quarter
- Producers: James Elkington; Joan Shelley

Joan Shelley chronology
Rivers & Vessels (2018)	Like the River Loves the Sea (2019)	The Spur (2022)

Like the River Loves the Sea is the seventh studio album by American folk musician Joan Shelley. It was released on August 30, 2019, by independent label No Quarter Records. The album received critical acclaim from critics, with many praising its calmness and depth.

== Recording ==
The majority of the album was recorded in Reykjavík, Iceland, near the esteemed Iðnó cultural center, and produced in collaboration with English folk singer-songwriter James Elkington.

== Critical reception ==
Professional ratings
Aggregate scores
Source	Rating
Metacritic	83/100
Review scores
Source	Rating
AllMusic	4/5 stars
Rolling Stone	3.5/5 stars
The Guardian	4/5 stars
Paste Magazine	8.5/10 stars
Pitchfork	8.1/10 stars

Like the River Loves the Sea received extensive praise from critics. The album has a Metacritic score of 83/100, based on 12 reviews, indicating "universal acclaim".

== Track listing ==
All tracks are written by Joan Shelley.

Track listing for Like the River Loves the Sea
No.	Title	Length
1.	"Haven"	1:44
2.	"Coming Down for You"	3:12
3.	"Teal"	4:10
4.	"Cycle"	3:50
5.	"When What It Is"	2:58
6.	"The Fading"	3:09
7.	"The Sway"	3:22
8.	"Awake"	3:12
9.	"Stay All Night"	3:04
10.	"Tell Me Something"	2:46
11.	"High on the Mountain"	3:49
12.	"Any Day Now"	3:30
