= Dungeness (album) =

Studio album by Trembling Bells
- Released: 30 March 2018
- Length: 47:26
- Label: Tin Angel

Trembling Bells chronology
Wide Majestic Aire (2016)	Dungeness (2018)

Professional ratings
Aggregate scores
Source	Rating
Metacritic	78/100
Review scores
Source	Rating
The Guardian	(4/5)
The Line of Best Fit	(9/10)
The Skinny	3.5/5 stars

Dungeness is the sixth studio album by Scottish band Trembling Bells. It was released in March 2018 under Tin Angel Records.

== Critical reception ==
Dungeness was met with "generally favorable" reviews from critics. At Metacritic, which assigns a weighted average rating out of 100 to reviews from mainstream publications, this release received an average score of 78, based on 8 reviews. Aggregator Album of the Year gave the release a 75 out of 100 based on a critical consensus of 6 reviews.

== Track listing ==
No.	Title	Length
1.	"Big Nothing"	1:05
2.	"Knockin' on the Coffin"	5:07
3.	"My Father Was a Collapsing Star"	5:12
4.	"Death Knocked at My Door"	6:02
5.	"Christ's Entry Into Govan"	5:50
6.	"The Prophet"	5:08
7.	"Devil in Dungeness"	5:03
8.	"This Is How the World Will End"	5:21
9.	"I'm Coming"	4:02
10.	"Rebecca, Dressed as a Waterfall"	4:36
