= What the Brothers Sang =

Studio album by Dawn McCarthy and Bonnie "Prince" Billy
- Released: February 18, 2013
- Recorded: Butcher Shoppe (Nashville, Tennessee)
- Length: 39:45
- Label: (United States) Drag City (United Kingdom) Domino

Dawn McCarthy and Bonnie "Prince" Billy chronology
The Marble Downs (2012)	What the Brothers Sang (2013)	Bonnie "Prince" Billy (2013)

What the Brothers Sang is an album by Dawn McCarthy (of Faun Fables) and Bonnie "Prince" Billy. The album was released on February 19, 2013. The album features covers of songs that appeared on albums by the Everly Brothers. The duo preceded this album with the "Christmas Eve Can Kill You" 7" single in late 2012, also featuring two covers of songs earlier performed by the Everlys. What the Brothers Sang was the first of three major albums released in 2013 to feature Everly Brothers covers in their entirety, the second being A Date with the Everly Brothers by the Chapin Sisters and the third being Foreverly by Billie Joe Armstrong and Norah Jones.

== Critical reception ==
Professional ratings
Aggregate scores
Source	Rating
Metacritic	77/100
Review scores
Source	Rating
AllMusic	4/5 stars
The A.V. Club	B+
Pitchfork	7.0/10

The album received generally favorable reviews, with a cumulative score of 77/100 based on 16 reviews on the Metacritic review aggregator website.

== Track listing ==
No.	Title	Writer(s)	Length
1.	"Breakdown"	Kris Kristofferson	3:08
2.	"Empty Boxes"	Ron Elliott	2:47
3.	"Milk Train"	Tony Romeo	2:46
4.	"What Am I Living For"	Art Harris, Fred Jay	3:36
5.	"My Little Yellow Bird"	Don Everly	2:23
6.	"Devoted to You"	Felice and Boudleaux Bryant	2:24
7.	"Somebody Help Me"	Jackie Edwards	2:36
8.	"So Sad"	Don Everly	3:20
9.	"Omaha"	Don Everly	4:05
10.	"It's All Over"	Don Everly	3:05
11.	"Poems, Prayers and Promises"	John Denver	3:57
12.	"Just What I Was Looking For"	Gerry Goffin, Carole King	3:06
13.	"Kentucky"	Carl Davis	2:32

== Personnel ==
- John Barron - euphonium, trombone
- John Catchings - cello
- Billy Contreras - fiddle
- Dan Dugmore - steel guitar, guitar
- David Ferguson - vocals, guitar
- Nils Frykdahl - flute
- Emmett Kelly - guitar, vocals
- Kenny Malone - drums
- Ian McAllister - euphonium, trombone
- Dawn McCarthy - vocals
- Pat McLaughlin - vocals
- Joey Miskulin - accordion
- John Mock - mandolin, harmonium
- Will "Bonnie Prince Billy" Oldham - vocals
- Dave Roe - bass
- Matt Sweeney - guitar
- Noah Taggart - sousaphone, tuba
- Peter Townsend - percussion
- Dr. Chris Vivio - tuba
- Bobby Wood - piano, organ
