= My Life (Phil Ochs song) =

Song by Phil Ochs

from the album Rehearsals for Retirement
- Published: 1969
- Released: 1969
- Genre: Folk rock
- Length: 3:11
- Label: A&M
- Songwriter(s): Phil Ochs
- Producer(s): Larry Marks

"My Life"
- Promotional copy of "My Life"

Single by Phil Ochs
- B-side: "The World Began in Eden and Ended in Los Angeles"
- Released: 1969
- Genre: Folk rock
- Length: 3:11
- Label: A&M
- Songwriter(s): Phil Ochs
- Producer(s): Larry Marks

Phil Ochs singles chronology
"The War Is Over" (1968)	"My Life" (1969)	"One Way Ticket Home" (1972)

"My Life" is a 1969 song by Phil Ochs, an American singer-songwriter best known for the protest songs he wrote in the 1960s.

"My Life" is the fifth song on Rehearsals for Retirement, an album Ochs recorded in the aftermath of the protests at the 1968 Democratic National Convention in Chicago. In the song, Ochs says that his life, which had once been a joy, had become like death to him.

In "My Life", Ochs sings "Take everything I own/Take your tap from my phone/And leave my life alone." Years after his death, it was revealed that the FBI had a file of nearly 500 pages on Ochs.
