= Trembling Bells =

Scottish folk rock group

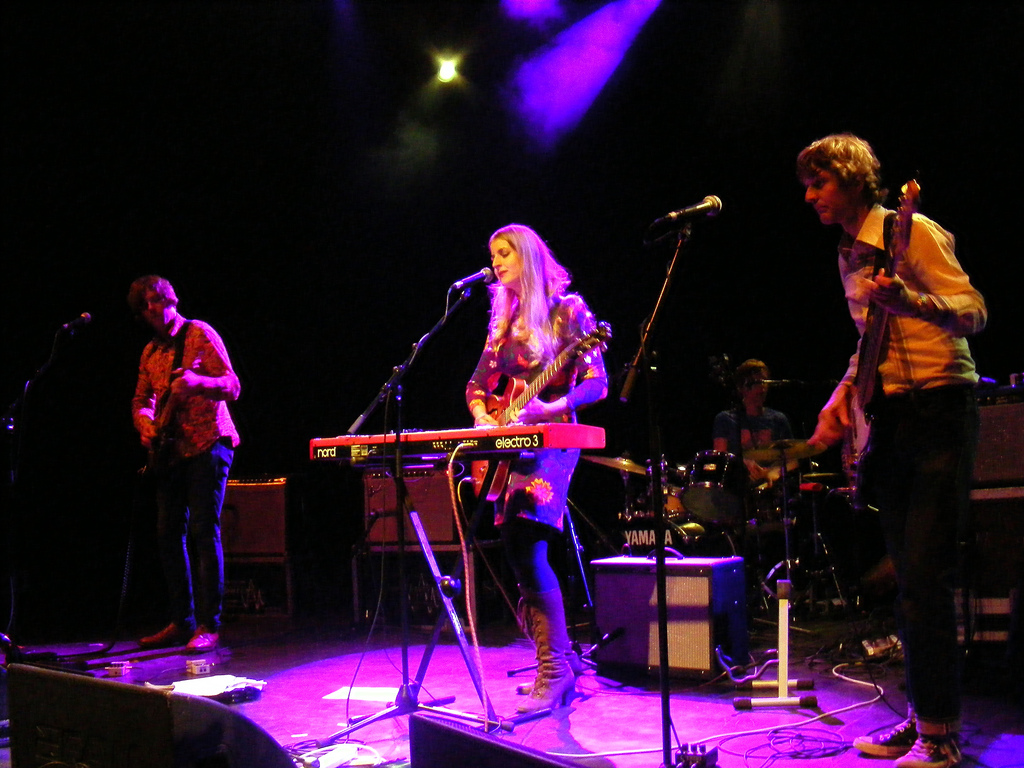
Trembling Bells performing live on 4 August 2010

Trembling Bells were a Scottish folk rock group formed in 2008 by drummer Alex Neilson, a musician with a history of free and improvised playing with several artists. Based in Glasgow, the group released three albums through Honest Jon's Records. A fourth, The Sovereign Self, was released on 29 June 2015, followed by an EP in 2016, both on Tin Angel Records. Their last album, Dungeness, was released in March 2018. In September 2018, frontwoman Lavinia Blackwall announced she was leaving the band after 10 years. Following a further run of gigs, the band announced they were to split, with members focusing on their individual projects.

== Career ==
Neilson had previously collaborated with early music vocalist and musician Lavinia Blackwall, in the free improvisation folk music project, Directing Hand. Neilson gathered a group from members of his previous musical projects, consisting of bassist Simon Shaw (formerly of Lucky Luke) and guitarist Ben Reynolds along with occasional players George Murray (trombone) and Aby Vuillamy (viola), both formerly of Scatter and The One Ensemble. The group signed to Honest Jon's Records in 2009 and released debut Carbeth, produced by radio presenter and musician John Cavanagh, in April 2009. The album was well received by critics. Carbeth holds a 76 (mostly favourable) rating from 7 reviews at Metacritic.

The band's second album, Abandoned Love, was produced by John Cavanagh, and co-produced by Belle and Sebastian member Stevie Jackson and released a year later in April 2010. Between albums Ben Reynolds was replaced by Mike Hastings on guitar. The critical response to this album was again positive. "Hidebound fol-de-rolling is just not an option for this band; they take the antic forms, loosen them and make them arresting and new once more." wrote Kitty Empire in The Guardian. Comparing with the debut album John Mulvey said that "The same elements remain – though perhaps less String Bandish whimsy – but this time, Trembling Bells are gutsier, more forthright, glowing with confidence" Abandoned Love was tipped as a possible nomination for the 2010 Mercury Music Prize, but their label did not enter the album into the contest.

Third album, The Constant Pageant was released on 21 March 2011. Reviews were again generally favourable. Critics observed a move towards mainstream pop Popmatters gave the album nine out of ten, stating "We should probably be careful about reading too much development into the material on album number three, because some of it appears to date back to the time of their debut ("Goathland", for example, was in the band's live repertoire from the start). Even so, it is still tempting to say that The Constant Pageant is the strongest collection Trembling Bells have yet put out." The reviewer for Uncut gave a mixed review, writing "one hopes the band will not steer too close to plain old indie rock." The album has an 81 out of 100 at Metacritic based on 5 reviews.

Trembling Bells performed a BBC Radio 6 Music session on the Marc Riley show on Monday 6 June 2011.

A fourth Trembling Bells album, The Sovereign Self, was released by Tin Angel Records on 29 June 2015. A fifth album, Wide Majestic Aire, came out on 1 April 2016, also on Tin Angel Records.

Album number six, Dungeness, was released on 30 March 2018, again on Tin Angel Records.

Following Lavinia Blackwall's announcement she was leaving the band, Trembling Bells decided to split at the end of 2018. Their final release was a 2019 Record Store Day 10", I am the King, a joint work with Alex Neilson's solo project Alex Rex.

Blackwall released her debut solo single "Waiting for Tomorrow" in December 2018, followed by an album, Muggington Lane End, in May 2020.

Simon Shaw went on to be a member of Youth of America, who released their debut album YOA Rising in January 2019 on Fighting Swans Records, and MONICA with Ian Stoddart from The Apples/Aberfeldy. MONICA's debut album Celebration was released a couple of months before Stoddart died, on 24 April 2020. It received a 4 star review in The Scotsman newspaper and was compared to the work of The Blue Nile.

== Influences and style ==
Trembling Bells' references late 1960s psychedelia and British folk revival acts such as Fairport Convention and the Incredible String Band. Lavinia Blackwall's soaring vocal style has drawn comparisons to Sandy Denny and We Five's Beverly Bivens. Stuart Maconie described their music as "wild and romantic, witty and heartbreaking", saying that "It has both the charm of folk music and the power of rock". John Mulvey has said "the rickety spirit of various Pastels/Bill Wells affiliates can be heard occasionally"

== Live performances and tours ==
Trembling Bells played at Green Man Festival 2009. In 2010 they performed at All Tomorrow's Parties Bowlie Weekender 2 curated by Belle and Sebastian. The group toured the UK and Ireland in Spring 2011 to promote The Constant Pageant In August 2011, the group conducted a 5-date tour of the UK in collaboration with Mike Heron of the Incredible String Band. Reviewing their London show at the Vortex Jazz Club Robin Denselow gave it four out of five stars and said the gig was "This was an intriguing double bill, matching one of the originators of the experimental British psych-folk scene against its most interesting current exponents." Mike Heron & Trembling Bells with Shelah McDonald, Oran Mor – Glasgow 2 August 2013. They conducted a small return tour around the UK together in December 2014, which Freq described as being as if "you were transported back to that hazy time in the '60s when music was magical and could open different doors to whole new experiences".

== Band members ==
The final (2018) lineup of Trembling Bells was:

- Lavinia Blackwall (keyboard, guitar, vocal)
- Alex Neilson (drums, vocal)
- Michael Hastings (guitar, vocal)
- Simon Shaw (bass guitar, vocal)
- Alasdair Mitchell (keyboard, guitar, vocal)

== Discography ==
=== Albums ===
- 2009 Carbeth
- 2010 Abandoned Love
- 2011 The Constant Pageant
- 2012 The Marble Downs with Bonnie "Prince" Billy
- 2015 The Sovereign Self
- 2016 Wide Majestic Aire (EP)
- 2018 Dungeness

=== Singles ===
- 2010 "New Year's Eve's the Loneliest Night of the Year" (with Bonnie Prince Billy and Mike Heron)
- 2014 "New Trip on the Old Wine" / "Lay It Down" (with Bonnie Prince Billy)
- 2015 "Hallelujah" / "Wah Wah" (Record Store Day release)
- 2016 "Who Call the Law?" / "Made for the May" (Record Store Day release)
- 2017 "The Auld Triangle" (Record Store Day release, split 10" with Alex Rex)
- 2019 "I am the King" (Record Store Day release, split 10" with Alex Rex)
