= An Arrow Through the Bitch =

EP by Palace Brothers
- Released: February 1994
- Length: 18:25
- Label: Domino; RUG 21T (UK, 12"); RUG 21CD (UK, CD)

Palace Brothers chronology
| An Arrow Through the Bitch (1994) | Hope (1994) |

Professional ratings
Review scores
| Source | Rating |
|---|---|
| AllMusic | 4.5/5 stars |

An Arrow Through the Bitch is an EP by Palace Brothers, released in 1994 through Domino Records in the United Kingdom. The EP is a collection of two singles previously released in the US on Drag City: "Come In" / "Trudy Dies" (1993) and "Horses" / "Stable Will" (1994).

== Track listing ==
1. "Come In" – 3:00
2. "Horses" (Brendan Croker, Sally Timms, Jon Langford) – 4:28
3. "Stable Will" (Bryan Rich) – 5:49
4. "Trudy Dies" – 5:08
