= Hope (Palace Songs EP) =

EP by Palace Songs
- Released: 1994
- Recorded: Chicago, IL, London, England
- Genre: Folk rock
- Length: 20:21
- Label: Drag City; DC57 (US, miniLP, CD); Domino; WIG LP18 (UK, miniLP); WIG CD18 (UK, CD)
- Producer: Sean O'Hagan; Will Oldham

Palace Songs chronology
An Arrow Through the Bitch (1994)	Hope (1994)	The Mountain (1994)

Professional ratings
Review scores
Source	Rating
AllMusic	4/5 stars
Robert Christgau	(dud)
Drowned in Sound	7/10
MusicHound Rock: The Essential Album Guide	3.5/5 stars
New Musical Express	6/10
Spin Alternative Record Guide	8/10

Hope is an EP by Palace Songs. It was released in 1994 through Drag City Records. The title "Agnes, Queen of Sorrow" is a reference to the short story "Jane Sinclair; or, the Fawn of Springvale" by 19th century author William Carleton.

== Critical reception ==
AllMusic wrote that "given a rich, reliable musical backing on Hope, Oldham is free to wander without hindering the songs." Trouser Press wrote that "the fuller tone of these songs, colored to a great degree by Liam Hayes’ Hammond organ, is reminiscent of Dylan’s initial Nashville forays — particularly the hypnotic 'Agnes, Queen of Sorrow.'" The Spin Alternative Record Guide wrote that Oldham "hones the edge between uncertainty and beauty."

== Track listing ==
1. "Agnes, Queen of Sorrow" – 4:05
2. "Untitled" – 2:23
3. "Winter Lady" (Leonard Cohen) – 2:42
4. "Christmastime in the Mountains" – 1:38
5. "All Gone, All Gone" – 4:52
6. "Werner's Last Blues to Blokbuster" – 4:41

== Personnel ==
- Push (Will Oldham) – vocals, guitar, bass
- Liam Hayes – piano, organ, electric guitar
- Rian Murphy – drums, harmonies
- Sean O'Hagan – piano, harmonies
- Rob Allum – drums
- Briana Corrigan – harmonies
