= Strange Form of Life =

EP by Bonnie 'Prince' Billy
- Released: 20 March 2007
- Length: 15:53
- Label: Drag City; DC337 (US, 12", CDs); Domino; RUG248 (UK, 12", CDs)

Bonnie 'Prince' Billy chronology
Seafarers Music (2004)	Strange Form of Life (2007)

Strange Form of Life is the name of a Bonnie 'Prince' Billy EP, whose title track is taken from the 2006 album The Letting Go. The remainder of the EP comes from a Daytrotter session recorded by Will Oldham (Bonnie 'Prince' Billy's name) in August 2006. The EP is available on 12" vinyl, and an Enhanced CD, which includes the music video for the title track, directed by Jennifer Parsons.

== Track listing ==
1. "Strange Form of Life" – 3:44
2. "New Partner" – 3:49
3. "The Sun Highlights the Lack in Each" – 4:24
4. "The Seedling" – 3:56
