= Western Music (EP) =

EP by Will Oldham
- Released: 28 November 1997
- Length: 11:47
- Label: Acuarela Ovni; Aff. 002 (Spain, CDs)

Will Oldham chronology
Songs Put Together For (The Broken Giant) (1996)	Western Music (1997)	Blue Lotus Feet (1998)

Professional ratings
Review scores
Source	Rating
Allmusic	2.5/5 stars

Western Music is a Will Oldham EP released on Spanish record label Acuarela Ovni. The EP also features Mick Turner and Jim White of Australian band Dirty Three.

== Track listing ==
1. "Always Bathing in the Evening" – 3:28
2. "Western Song for J.LL." – 3:31
3. "Three Photographs" – 1:49
4. "Jump In Jump In, Come In Come In " – 2:59
