= Master and Everyone =

Studio album by Bonnie "Prince" Billy
- Released: January 28, 2003
- Genre: Americana, contemporary folk
- Length: 34:09
- Label: Drag City

Bonnie "Prince" Billy chronology
Ease Down the Road (2001b)	Master and Everyone (2003)	Sings Greatest Palace Music (2004)

Master and Everyone is a 2003 studio album by Bonnie "Prince" Billy. It was released on Drag City.

== Critical reception ==
Professional ratings
Aggregate scores
Source	Rating
Metacritic	83/100
Review scores
Source	Rating
AllMusic	4/5 stars
Entertainment Weekly	A−
The Guardian	5/5 stars
NME	9/10
Pitchfork	6.0/10
Q	4/5 stars
Uncut	5/5 stars

At Metacritic, which assigns a weighted average score out of 100 to reviews from mainstream critics, the album received an average score of 83, based on 11 reviews, indicating "universal acclaim".

NME named it the 37th best album of 2003.

== Track listing ==
All tracks are written by Will Oldham.

No.	Title	Length
1.	"The Way"	3:49
2.	"Ain't You Wealthy, Ain't You Wise?"	4:12
3.	"Master and Everyone"	2:35
4.	"Wolf Among Wolves"	3:47
5.	"Joy and Jubilee"	2:45
6.	"Maundering"	3:05
7.	"Lessons from What's Poor"	3:41
8.	"Even If Love"	3:24
9.	"Three Questions"	3:14
10.	"Hard Life"	3:34

Japanese edition bonus track
No.	Title	Length
11.	"Forest Time"	6:42

== Personnel ==
Credits adapted from liner notes.

- Will Oldham
- Paul Oldham
- Tony Crow – keyboards
- William Tyler – guitar
- Matt Swanson – tambourine
- Gary Lee Tussing – cello
- Marty Slayton – vocals
- John Kelton – whistle

== Charts ==
Chart	Peak position
Belgian Albums (Ultratop Flanders)	47
French Albums (SNEP)	139
Dutch Albums (Album Top 100)	97
Norwegian Albums (VG-lista)	8
UK Albums (OCC)	48
US Independent Albums (Billboard)	49
