= The Marble Downs =

Studio album by Trembling Bells and Bonnie "Prince" Billy
- Released: April 12, 2012
- Length: 48:21
- Label: Honest Jon's

Trembling Bells and Bonnie "Prince" Billy chronology
| Wolfroy Goes to Town (2011) | The Marble Downs (2012) | What the Brothers Sang (2013) |

The Marble Downs is an album by the Trembling Bells and Bonnie "Prince" Billy. The album was released in 2012 by Honest Jon's Records in the UK. The album features vocals by Lavinia Blackwall of the Trembling Bells and Bonnie 'Prince' Billy.

== Critical reception ==
Professional ratings
Aggregate scores
| Source | Rating |
|---|---|
| Metacritic | 79/100 |
Review scores
| Source | Rating |
| AllMusic | 4/5 stars |
| Consequence of Sound | 4/5 stars |
| The Guardian | 3/5 stars |
| The Skinny | 4/5 stars |

The album was not widely reviewed. However the reviews it did receive were generally positive. It received a score of 79/100 based on eight reviews on the Metacritic review aggregator website.

== Track listing ==
All tracks are written by Alex Neilson except where stated

| No. | Title | Writer(s) | Length |
|---|---|---|---|
| 1. | "I Made a Date (With an Open Vein)" | | 6:34 |
| 2. | "I Can Tell You're Leaving" | | 4:36 |
| 3. | "Ferrari in a Demolition Derby" | | 4:15 |
| 4. | "Ain't Nothing Wrong with a Little Longing" | | 6:55 |
| 5. | "Excursions into Assonance" | Dorothy Parker, Lavinia Blackwall | 4:22 |
| 6. | "Every Time I Close My Eyes (We're Back There)" | | 5:51 |
| 7. | "Love Is a Velvet Noose" | | 3:39 |
| 8. | "My Husband's Got No Courage in Him" | Traditional | 2:16 |
| 9. | "Riding" | Will Oldham | 3:13 |
| 10. | "Lord Bless All" | Robin Gibb | 6:45 |

== Personnel ==
- Martin Beer - bass
- Lavinia Blackwall - vocals, piano, organ, guitar, glockenspiel, percussion
- Dave Dixon - vocals
- Lucy Farrell - violin, viola
- Mike Hastings - guitar, lap-steel guitar
- Ross MacRae - trombone
- Michael John McCarthy - accordion
- Saoirse McDonald - recorder
- Richard Merchant - trumpet
- Alasdair C. Mitchell - vocals
- Alex Neilson - drums, bells, theremin, vocals
- Peter Nicholson - cello
- John Nicol - vocals
- Will "Bonnie Prince Billy" Oldham – vocals
- Sybren Renema - saxophone
- Simon Shaw - bass
