= The Anomoanon =

American rock music group

The Anomoanon is an American rock music group formed in 1997 by Ned Oldham, Aram Stith, Jason Stith, Jack Carneal, Willy MacLean, and David Heumann.

== Discography ==
The Anomoanon

- Hello My / The Free Web (7") (1997) Palace Records
- Mother Goose (1998) Palace Records
- Summer Never Ends (EP/CD) (1999) Palace Records
- Portland / Now Is The Season (7") (1999) Low Fly Records
- De Avonden XMAS 1999 (compilation) (1999) VPRO
- Songs From Robert Louis Stevenson's "A Child's Garden Of Verses" (1999) Palace Records
- The Anomoanon (2001) Palace Records
- Envoi Villon (12") (2002) Galaxia Records
- Asleep Many Years In The Wood (2002) Temporary Residence
- Portrait Of John Entwistle (10") (2003) Western Vinyl
- Joji (2004) Temporary Residence
- The Derby Ram (2004) September Gurls (vinyl)/Box Tree (CD)
- Everything Comes & Goes: a Tribute to Black Sabbath (2005) Temporary Residence
- Not Alone (2006) Durtro Jnana
- Thankful (2006) Temporary Residence

Ned Oldham

- Ned Oldham - Let's Go Out Tonight (2010) Gold Robot
- Old Calf - Borrow A Horse (2011) No Quarter
- Ned Oldham - Further Gone (2014) No Quarter
- Shirley Collins Inspired... (Ned Oldham) (2014) Burning Bridges & Fifth Column Films
- Ned Oldham - New Year Carol (2015)
