= The Mountain (EP) =

EP by Palace
- Released: 1995
- Label: Drag City; DC71 (US, 12", CDs); Palace; PR3 (US, 12", CDs); Domino; RUG 35T/CD (UK, 12", CDs)

Palace chronology
Hope (1994)	The Mountain (1995)	Songs Put Together For (The Broken Giant) (1996)

Professional ratings
Review scores
Source	Rating
Allmusic	link

The Mountain by Palace is a Will Oldham EP released in 1995. The EP is a compilation of two previously released Oldham singles, "West Palm Beach" / "Gulf Shores" (1994) and "The Mountain" / "(End of) Travelling" (1995).

== Track listing ==
1. "The Mountain"
2. "(End of) Travelling"
3. "Gulf Shores"
4. "West Palm Beach"
