= Lie Down in the Light =

Studio album by Bonnie "Prince" Billy
- Released: May 20, 2008
- Genre: Indie folk, alternative country
- Length: 45:39
- Label: Drag City
- Producer: Mark Nevers

Bonnie "Prince" Billy chronology
Wai Notes (2007)	Lie Down in the Light (2008)	Beware (2009)

Professional ratings
Aggregate scores
Source	Rating
Metacritic	81/100
Review scores
Source	Rating
AllMusic	4/5 stars
The A.V. Club	A−
Cokemachineglow	83%
Drowned in Sound	7/10
The Guardian	4/5 stars
musicOMH	4.5/5 stars
Now	4/5 stars
Pitchfork	8.7/10
This Is Fake DIY	8/10
Uncut	4/5 stars

Lie Down in the Light is a studio album by Will Oldham. It was released under the moniker Bonnie "Prince" Billy on Drag City in 2008.

== Track listing ==
All tracks are written by Will Oldham, except where noted.

No.	Title	Length
1.	"Easy Does It"	3:53
2.	"You Remind Me of Something (The Glory Goes)"	3:56
3.	"So Everyone"	4:01
4.	"For Every Field There's a Mole"	3:19
5.	"(Keep Eye On) Other's Gain"	4:35
6.	"You Want That Picture"	3:50
7.	"Missing One"	2:47
8.	"What's Missing Is"	4:27
9.	"Where Is the Puzzle?"	3:50
10.	"Lie Down in the Light"	4:09
11.	"Willow Trees Bend"	4:08
12.	"I'll Be Glad" (Shannon Stephens)	2:43

== Personnel ==
Musicians

- Will Oldham – music
- Emmett Kelly – guitar, harmony voice, recorder, shrooti box
- Shahzad Ismaily – percussion, banjo, piano, electric guitar, row of wrenches, laptop organ
- Paul Oldham – bass guitar
- Ashley Webber – voice
- Roy Agee – trombone
- Tony Crow – piano, organ
- Glen Duncan – fiddle
- Pete Finney – pedal steel guitar
- Ben Martin – percussion
- Dennis Solee – clarinet
- Rod Fletcher – voices
- John Ryles – voices
- Marty Slayton – voices

Production

- Mark Nevers – recording
- Paul Oldham – mixing (5)
- Scott Colburn – mastering
- Joanne Oldham – cover drawing, depicting Jacob Wrestling with the Angel

== Charts ==
Chart	Peak position
Belgian Albums (Ultratop Flanders)	51
Norwegian Albums (VG-lista)	18
