= Wrinkle Neck Mules =

- Origin: Richmond, Virginia, U.S.
- Genres: Folk rock Indie rock Indie folk Folk; Roots rock New folk Bluegrass
- Years active: 1999–present
- Labels: Lower 40 Records
- Members: Andy Stepanian; Mason Brent; Chase Heard; Stuart Gunter; Brian Gregory
- Website: http://www.wrinkleneckmules.com

Wrinkle Neck Mules is an American band from Richmond, Virginia. The band has released 6 full-length records and one EP. Songwriting duties are primarily split between Andy Stepanian and Chase Heard, who are also owners of the clothing company Howler Brothers. The band keeps a limited touring schedule because the members are split between Virginia and Texas.

== Discography ==
=== Albums ===
- Minor Enough (2003)
- Pull the Brake (2006)
- The Wicks Have Met (2007)
- Let The Lead Fly (2009)
- Apprentice To Ghosts (2012)
- I Never Thought It Would Go This Far (2015)

=== EPs ===
- Liza (2010)
