= Ease Down the Road =

Studio album by Bonnie "Prince" Billy
- Released: March 19, 2001
- Length: 44:02
- Label: Palace
- Producer: The Continental Op

Bonnie "Prince" Billy chronology
I See a Darkness (1999)	Ease Down the Road (2001)	Master and Everyone (2003)

Ease Down the Road is the seventh studio album by American musician Will Oldham, and the second under his moniker Bonnie "Prince" Billy. It was released on Palace Records on March 19, 2001.

Domino Recording Company also released a UK limited edition 2-disc version of the album (Domino WIGCD89X). The bonus disc contains tracks taken from a BBC Peel Session first transmitted on March 16, 1999. The lineup includes Will Oldham, Mike Fellows, James Lo, and Matt Sweeney.

== Critical reception ==
Professional ratings
Review scores
Source	Rating
AllMusic	4/5 stars
Drowned in Sound	10/10
The Guardian	3/5 stars
NME	9/10
Pitchfork	7.9/10
Q	4/5 stars
Uncut	8/10

Nathan Bush of AllMusic said: "Seeming more confident than ever, Oldham's Ease Down the Road is a wonderful addition to a catalog that should earn him a place among the finest songwriters of his age, or any age." Matt LeMay of Pitchfork gave the album a 7.9 out of 10, calling it "Oldham's most fleshed-out work to date" and "his most sonically diverse."

The Wire included it on the "2001 Rewind" list.

== Track listing ==
No.	Title	Length
1.	"May It Always Be"	4:04
2.	"Careless Love"	2:06
3.	"A King at Night"	4:29
4.	"Just to See My Holly Home"	3:40
5.	"At Break of Day"	4:14
6.	"After I Made Love to You"	3:53
7.	"Ease Down the Road"	3:06
8.	"The Lion Lair"	6:01
9.	"Mrs William"	3:03
10.	"Sheep"	2:54
11.	"Grand Dark Feeling of Emptiness"	3:23
12.	"Rich Wife Full of Happiness"	3:07

Japanese edition bonus track
No.	Title	Length
13.	"Carolyn"

UK limited edition bonus disc
No.	Title	Length
1.	"What's Wrong with a Zoo?"	4:29
2.	"I Send My Love to You"	2:42
3.	"Stablemate"	4:21

== Personnel ==
Credits adapted from liner notes.

- Todd Brashear – vocals, lap steel guitar
- Matt Everett – violin
- Mike Fellows – bass guitar
- Paul Greenlaw – vocals, banjo
- Catherine Irwin – vocals
- Harmony Korine – vocals
- Ned Oldham – vocals, guitar, bass guitar
- Will Oldham – vocals, guitar, Nord Lead, percussion
- David Pajo – vocals, guitar, bass guitar, Nord Lead, piano, percussion
- Bryan Rich – guitar
- Matt Sweeney – vocals, guitar, banjo
- Jon Theodore – drums, percussion

== Charts ==
Chart	Peak position
UK Albums (OCC)	88
