= More Revery =

EP by Bonnie Billy
- Released: 2000
- Label: Temporary Residence (TRR-37)

Bonnie Billy chronology
Ode Music (2000)	More Revery (2000)	Seafarers Music (2004)

More Revery by Bonnie Billy is the name of a Will Oldham EP released in 2000 as Volume 7 of the Travels in Constants subscription series on the label Temporary Residence Limited. It was recorded live at the Palais du Congres in Shelbyville, Kentucky by Paul Oldham and consists of six cover songs.

The EP was reissued in 2001 as Temporary Residence TRR-37, with different song mixes and the crowd noise removed.

It was rated 8.0 out of ten by Pitchfork.

== Track listing ==
1. "Someone's Sleeping" (John Phillips)
2. "Sweeter Than Anything" (P.J. Harvey)
3. "Same Love That Made Me Laugh" (Bill Withers)
4. "A Dream of the Sea" (The Renderers)
5. "Strange Things" (John Holt)
6. "Just to See You Smile" (Mark Nesler/Tony Martin) (Tim McGraw cover)
