= Cursed Sleep =

Single by Bonnie 'Prince' Billy

from the album The Letting Go
- Released: 25 July 2006
- Label: Drag City; DC316 (US, 12", CDs); Domino; RUG230 (UK, 12", CDs)
- Songwriter(s): Bonnie 'Prince' Billy

"Cursed Sleep" is a Bonnie 'Prince' Billy single taken from the 2006 album The Letting Go. The single comes in both 12" vinyl and CD formats.

== Track listing ==
1. "Cursed Sleep"
2. "The Signifying Wolf"
3. "God's Small Song"
