= Bonnie "Prince" Billy (album) =

Studio album by Bonnie "Prince" Billy
- Released: August 2013
- Genres: Indie folk, alternative country
- Length: 28:19
- Label: Palace
- Producer: Bonnie "Prince" Billy

Bonnie "Prince" Billy chronology
What the Brothers Sang (2013)	Bonnie "Prince" Billy (2013)	Singer's Grave – A Sea of Tongues (2014)

Professional ratings
Review scores
Source	Rating
Pitchfork	7.8/10

Bonnie "Prince" Billy is a studio EP by Will Oldham. It was released under the moniker Bonnie "Prince" Billy in 2013.

== Track listing ==
All tracks are written by Will Oldham.

No.	Title	Length
1.	"I Heard of a Source"	2:44
2.	"Lessons from Stony"	2:55
3.	"Triumph of Will"	2:49
4.	"I Will Be Born Again"	2:43
5.	"Make It Not an Evil Mark"	3:07
6.	"The Spotted Pig"	2:23
7.	"This Is My Cocktail"	2:32
8.	"Bad Man"	2:22
9.	"Ending It All (As I Do)"	3:26
10.	"Royal Quiet Deluxe"	3:18

== Personnel ==
Credits adapted from liner notes.

- Will Oldham – music
- Timothy Stollenwerk – mastering
