= Arise Therefore =

Studio album by Palace Music
- Released: April 29, 1996
- Length: 43:58
- Label: Palace
- Producer: Steve Albini

Will Oldham / Palace chronology
Viva Last Blues (1995)	Arise Therefore (1996)	Joya (1997)

Arise Therefore is the fourth studio album by Will Oldham. It was released in 1996 under the moniker Palace Music, although sometimes credited simply to "Palace". The album features David Grubbs, Ned Oldham, and a Mayatone drum machine credited as "Maya Tone". It was recorded by Steve Albini at Pachyderm Studio in Cannon Falls, Minnesota.

== Critical reception ==
Professional ratings
Review scores
Source	Rating
AllMusic	4/5 stars
Alternative Press	5/5
Entertainment Weekly	B−
The Guardian	3/5 stars
Mojo	5/5 stars
NME	7/10
Select	4/5
Uncut	8/10

Kurt Wolff of AllMusic praised the lyrics, calling them "beautiful in their stark, pale honesty as often as they are indecipherable."

== Track listing ==
No.	Title	Length
1.	"Stablemate"	3:36
2.	"A Sucker's Evening"	3:01
3.	"Arise, Therefore"	4:05
4.	"You Have Cum in Your Hair and Your Dick Is Hanging Out"	3:40
5.	"Kid of Harith"	4:03
6.	"The Sun Highlights the Lack in Each"	5:36
7.	"No Gold Digger"	4:05
8.	"Disorder"	3:50
9.	"A Group of Women"	3:04
10.	"Give Me Children"	3:27
11.	"The Weaker Soldier"	5:28

== Personnel ==
Credits adapted from liner notes.

- David Grubbs – piano, organ
- Ned Oldham – bass guitar, effected guitar, additional vocals
- Will Oldham – vocals, electric guitar
- Maya Tone – drums, percussion
- Steve Albini – recording
- John Golden – mastering
- Gene Booth – artwork
