= Joan Shelley =

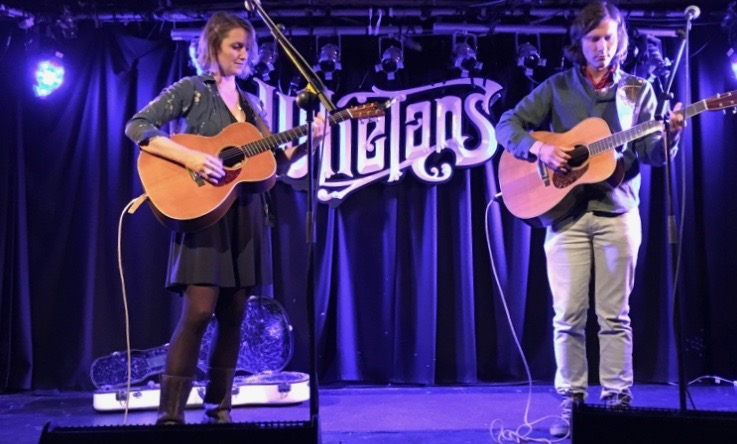
- Joan Shelley performing with Nathan Salsburg in Whelan's, Dublin in 2017

Background information
- Born: 1985 (age 40–41); Kentucky, U.S.
- Origin: Louisville, Kentucky, U.S.
- Genres: Indie folk, contemporary folk, country
- Occupation: Singer-songwriter
- Instruments: Vocals; guitar
- Years active: 2010–present
- Formerly of: Maiden Radio

Joan Shelley (born 1985) is an American indie folk musician from Louisville, Kentucky, United States.

== Career ==
Shelley has released nine solo studio recordings. Her second album, Ginko, and third album, Farthest Field (with Daniel Martin Moore), were released in 2012 on Ol Kentuck. In 2014, Shelley released her fourth album, Electric Ursa, on No Quarter Records. In 2015 she released her fifth album, Over and Even, also on No Quarter. In 2017, Shelley released her eponymous sixth album. Her seventh album, Like the River Loves the Sea, was released in 2019.

No Quarter released Shelley's eighth album, The Spur, on 24 June 2022. Upon its release, the album received critical acclaim.

== Personal life ==
Shelley attended the University of Georgia. She decided to go to the university due to Athens's strong music culture.

Shelley frequently works with her husband, guitarist and musicologist Nathan Salsburg. Shelley and Salsburg had a daughter in 2021.

== Discography ==
Studio albums

- By Dawnlight (2010, self-released)
- Ginko (2012, Ol Kentuck/ok recordings)
- Farthest Field – Daniel Martin Moore & Joan Shelley (2012, Ol Kentuck)
- Electric Ursa (2014, No Quarter)
- Over and Even (2015, No Quarter)
- Joan Shelley (2017, No Quarter)
- Rivers & Vessels (2018, self-released on Bandcamp)
- Like the River Loves the Sea (2019, No Quarter)
- The Spur (2022, No Quarter)
- Mood Ring (2024 EP, No Quarter)
- Real Warmth (2025, No Quarter)

Live Albums

- Live at The Bomhard (2020 No Quarter) – Recorded at the Bomhard Theater in Louisville, KY on December 13, 2019, with the Best Hands band: Jake Xerxes Fussell, Nathan Bowles, Anna Krippenstapel, and Nathan Salsburg. Guest appearances by Julia Purcell and Bonnie "Prince" Billy.
- Live at the Chapel of St. Phillip Neri (2022, self-released on Bandcamp)

With Maiden Radio (Maiden Radio are: Joan Shelley, Julia Purcell and Cheyenne Marie Mize)

- Maiden Radio (2010, self-released)
- Lullabies (2011, Ol Kentuck)
- Wolvering (2015, Ok Recordings)

Singles

- "Cost of the Cold" (2016, No Quarter)
- "Bed In The River" (2020, self-released on Bandcamp)
- "Blue Skies" (2020, self-released on Bandcamp)
