= I See a Darkness =

Studio album by Bonnie "Prince" Billy
- Released: January 19, 1999
- Genres: Indie folk; gothic folk; country folk
- Length: 37:56
- Labels: Palace; Domino

Will Oldham / Bonnie "Prince" Billy chronology
Joya (1997)	I See a Darkness (1999)	Ease Down the Road (2001)

I See a Darkness is the sixth studio album by American musician Will Oldham, and his first album under the name Bonnie "Prince" Billy. It was released on January 19, 1999, by Palace Records. The album features appearances from Bob Arellano, Colin Gagon, Paul Oldham, David Pajo, and Peter Townsend.

== Critical reception ==
Professional ratings
Review scores
Source	Rating
AllMusic	4.5/5 stars
Clash	9/10
Drowned in Sound	8/10
The Independent	4/5 stars
The List	4/5 stars
Mojo	5/5 stars
NME	7/10
Pitchfork	10/10
Q	4/5 stars
Uncut	5/5 stars

I See a Darkness received widespread acclaim from music critics. Pitchfork reviewer Samir Khan lauded the album as Oldham's "consummate offering" and "the type of record that demands solitary reverence". Uncut's Allan Jones deemed it Oldham's "most approachable album to date, a record of immense and fragile beauty, full of trembling emotional meditations on friendship, love, loss and mortality." Gregg Rounds of AllMusic said that it showcased "a more melodic style than the veteran Palace listener might be used to", further noting that Oldham "definitely hasn't abandoned his foundation of mordant lyrics and minimalist arrangements, but he has built a variety of different layers that make this album an emotional and pleasurable listening experience." For The A.V. Club, Stephen Thompson wrote that the "marvelous" I See a Darkness "may just represent the most appropriate synthesis yet of Oldham's vocals and backing band." Simon Williams of NME was more reserved in his praise of the album, advising listeners that "patience is a virtue" while nonetheless calling it a "delicate, intelligent record".

== Legacy ==
I See a Darkness has been included in several publications' lists of best albums. In 2003, Pitchfork ranked it the ninth-best album of the 1990s. In 2004, Stylus Magazine placed I See a Darkness at number 171 on its list of the 200 best albums of all time, while in 2006, Mojo listed it as a "modern classic" and the twentieth-best album released during the magazine's lifetime. It was also included in the book 1001 Albums You Must Hear Before You Die.

In 2002, Matt LeMay of Stylus Magazine wrote that "by addressing concepts so grand with such sincerity and skill, the album is incredibly powerful under even the most mundane of circumstances." Reviewing its 2012 reissue, Aaron Lavery of Drowned in Sound called I See a Darkness Oldham's "finest achievement thus far" and the "essential release" in his discography. Q deemed the album "his masterpiece, ushering in a direct and less mythic style of songwriting". "Looking for autobiographical truths in these songs is a red herring: you will not find the man here, but a series of masks," wrote Rob Young in Uncut, "usually tragic but occasionally the smiling one, portraying intense emotional states and psychological dramas."

Johnny Cash recorded the titular track on his 2000 album American III: Solitary Man, with Oldham providing background vocals. The title track was also covered by Steve Adey on his 2006 album All Things Real, and by Rosalía on her 2017 debut album Los Ángeles.

== Track listing ==
All lyrics are written by Will Oldham, except "Song for the New Breed" by Dianne Bellino; all music is composed by Oldham.

No.	Title	Length
1.	"A Minor Place"	3:43
2.	"Nomadic Revery (All Around)"	3:58
3.	"I See a Darkness"	4:44
4.	"Another Day Full of Dread"	3:10
5.	"Death to Everyone"	4:31
6.	"Knockturne"	2:17
7.	"Madeleine-Mary"	2:31
8.	"Song for the New Breed"	3:24
9.	"Today I Was an Evil One"	3:52
10.	"Black"	3:46
11.	"Raining in Darling"	1:54

Japanese edition bonus tracks
No.	Title	Length
12.	"I Am Drinking Again"	5:33
13.	"Ode #2"	4:07

== Personnel ==
Credits adapted from liner notes.

- Bob Arellano – music
- Colin Gagon – music, mixing
- Paul Oldham – music, recording
- Will Oldham – music
- Peter Townsend – music
- David Pajo – lead guitar (on "Song for the New Breed"), mixing
- Konrad Strauss – mastering
- Joanne Oldham – skull
- Joe Oldham – photography
- Sammy Harkham – drawing
- Len Small – layout

== Charts ==
Chart (1999)	Peak position
UK Albums (Official Charts)	151
UK Independent Albums (Official Charts)	25
