= Joya (album) =

Studio album by Will Oldham
- Released: October 27, 1997
- Genre: Alternative country; indie rock
- Length: 40:29
- Label: Drag City
- Producer: Dan Koretzky; Rian Murphy

Will Oldham chronology
Arise Therefore (1996)	Joya (1997)	I See a Darkness (1999)

Joya is the fifth studio album by American musician Will Oldham. It was released on Drag City in 1997 as the first album billed to his name, rather than the Palace or Bonnie "Prince" Billy monikers. It also features Bob Arellano, Colin Gagon, and David Pajo. Track 12 'Idea And Deed' is based on Dick Gaughan song of 'Both sides the Tweed'.

In 2007, when the album became available for download through iTunes, the artist credit was changed to Bonnie "Prince" Billy, with altered artwork reflecting the change.

== Critical reception ==
Professional ratings
Review scores
Source	Rating
AllMusic	4/5 stars
Entertainment Weekly	B+
NME	7/10
Uncut	9/10
The Village Voice	C+

Stephen Thomas Erlewine of AllMusic said that "it's a promising, ultimately unfulfilling record that doesn't quite prove whether Oldham is a songwriter of pretense or genuine talent." Rob O'Connor of Entertainment Weekly called it "hypnotic and sublimely bizarre."

== Track listing ==
All tracks are written by Will Oldham except 12 which is by Dick Gaughan.

No.	Title	Length
1.	"O Let It Be"	3:43
2.	"Antagonism"	5:18
3.	"New Gypsy"	3:13
4.	"Under What Was Oppression"	3:05
5.	"The Gator"	2:26
6.	"Open Your Heart"	3:27
7.	"Rider"	1:31
8.	"Be Still and Know God (Don't Be Shy)"	3:10
9.	"Apocolypse, No!"	3:44
10.	"I Am Still What I Meant to Be"	3:51
11.	"Bolden Boke Boy"	3:48
12.	"Idea and Deed"	3:13

Limited edition bonus disc: Little Joya
No.	Title	Length
1.	"Prologue"	1:35
2.	"Joya"	4:57
3.	"Exit Music (for a Dick)"	1:12

== Personnel ==
Credits adapted from liner notes.

- Bob Arellano – music
- Colin Gagon – music
- Will Oldham – music
- David Pajo – music
- Dan Koretzky – production
- Rian Murphy – production
- Chris Shepard – engineering
- Ubaldo Tirado – engineering
- Konrad Strauss – mastering
- Joe Oldham – photography
- Bryan Rich – photography
- Dan Osborn – layout
