= Viva Last Blues =

Studio album by Palace Music
- Released: August 21, 1995
- Recorded: Alabama, U.S.
- Genre: Folk rock
- Length: 31:27
- Label: Drag City
- Producer: Steve Albini

Will Oldham / Palace chronology
Days in the Wake (1994)	Viva Last Blues (1995)	Arise Therefore (1996)

Viva Last Blues is the third studio album by Will Oldham. It was released under the moniker Palace Music on Drag City in 1995. The album features Oldham on vocals and guitar, and was recorded by Steve Albini.

== Critical reception ==
Professional ratings
Review scores
Source	Rating
AllMusic	4.5/5 stars
Melody Maker	Recommended
NME	8/10
Q	3/5 stars
Rolling Stone	3/5 stars
Spin	8/10
Uncut	5/5 stars

Pitchfork placed the album at number 60 on the "Top 100 Albums of the 1990s" list. In 2007, Blender placed it at number 98 on the "100 Greatest Indie-Rock Albums Ever" list. In 2019, John Green reviewed the song "New Partner" for his podcast The Anthropocene Reviewed; he gave it 4 stars.

== Track listing ==
No.	Title	Length
1.	"More Brother Rides"	3:18
2.	"Viva Ultra"	3:18
3.	"The Brute Choir"	2:43
4.	"The Mountain Low"	2:44
5.	"Tonight's Decision (and Hereafter)"	4:10
6.	"Work Hard/Play Hard"	2:50
7.	"New Partner"	3:54
8.	"Cat's Blues"	3:18
9.	"We All, Us Three, Will Ride"	2:56
10.	"Old Jerusalem"	2:16

UK limited edition bonus 7"
No.	Title	Length
1.	"Black/Rich Tune"	3:19
2.	"You Have Cum... (Alt. Version)"	2:51

== Personnel ==
Credits adapted from liner notes.

- Liam Hayes – piano, organ
- Jason Loewenstein – drums, additional vocals
- Ned Oldham – bass guitar, slide guitar, additional vocals
- Will Oldham – vocals, guitar
- Bryan Rich – lead guitar
- Steve Albini – recording
- Eric Bates – engineering
- Eugene Bates – engineering
- Dianne Bellino – cover drawing
- Cynthia Kirkwood – painting
