= Days in the Wake =

Studio album by Palace Brothers
- Released: August 30, 1994
- Length: 26:55
- Label: Drag City

Will Oldham / Palace chronology
There Is No-One What Will Take Care of You (1993)	Days in the Wake (1994)	Viva Last Blues (1995)

Days in the Wake is the second studio album by Will Oldham. It was released under the moniker Palace Brothers on Drag City in 1994. Original copies of the album were eponymous.

== Critical reception ==
Professional ratings
Review scores
Source	Rating
AllMusic	4.5/5 stars
Entertainment Weekly	A−
NME	7/10
Q	4/5 stars
Rolling Stone	3.5/5 stars
Select	4/5
Spin Alternative Record Guide	8/10
Uncut	4/5 stars

Mark Deming of AllMusic said, "Days in the Wake is the simplest work in the Palace canon, and among the very best."

== Track listing ==
All tracks are written by Will Oldham.

No.	Title	Length
1.	"You Will Miss Me When I Burn"	3:18
2.	"Pushkin"	2:52
3.	"Come a Little Dog"	2:18
4.	"I Send My Love to You"	2:16
5.	"Meaulnes"	2:27
6.	"No More Workhorse Blues"	3:29
7.	"All Is Grace"	1:34
8.	"Whither Thou Goest"	2:02
9.	"(Thou Without) Partner"	4:03
10.	"I Am a Cinematographer"	2:36

== Personnel ==
- Will Oldham – guitar, vocals
- Ned Oldham – bass guitar, backing vocals (3)
- Paul Oldham – percussion (3)
