= The Letting Go =

Studio album by Bonnie "Prince" Billy
- Released: September 19, 2006
- Studio: Reykjavík, Iceland
- Genre: Alternative country; folk rock; indie rock
- Length: 58:09
- Label: Drag City
- Producer: Valgeir Sigurðsson

Bonnie "Prince" Billy chronology
The Brave and the Bold (2006)	The Letting Go (2006)	Ask Forgiveness (2007)

The Letting Go is a 2006 studio album by Bonnie "Prince" Billy. It was released on Drag City.

== Production ==
The album was recorded in Reykjavík, Iceland, and produced by Valgeir Sigurðsson, who is known for his work with the Icelandic artist Björk. The arrangement was done by Nico Muhly. Dawn McCarthy of Faun Fables also sings on the album.

The album's title comes from the last lines of the Emily Dickinson poem that starts "After a Great Pain, a Formal Feeling Comes."

This is the hour of lead

Remembered if outlived,

As freezing persons recollect the snow—

First chill, then stupor, then the letting go.

== Critical reception ==
Professional ratings
Aggregate scores
Source	Rating
Metacritic	84/100
Review scores
Source	Rating
AllMusic	5/5 stars
The A.V. Club	A
Entertainment Weekly	B+
The Guardian	3/5 stars
The Independent	4/5 stars
Mojo	4/5 stars
Pitchfork	8.2/10
Q	4/5 stars
Spin	3.5/5 stars
Uncut	4/5 stars

At Metacritic, which assigns a weighted average score out of 100 to reviews from mainstream critics, The Letting Go received an average score of 84% based on 24 reviews, indicating "universal acclaim".

Pitchfork placed The Letting Go at number 195 on their list of top 200 albums of the 2000s.

== Track listing ==
No.	Title	Length
1.	"Love Comes to Me"	4:31
2.	"Strange Form of Life"	3:46
3.	"Wai"	3:37
4.	"Cursed Sleep"	5:35
5.	"No Bad News"	4:45
6.	"Cold & Wet"	2:21
7.	"Big Friday"	2:43
8.	"Lay and Love"	3:50
9.	"The Seedling"	4:36
10.	"Then the Letting Go"	5:19
11.	"God's Small Song"	4:05
12.	"I Called You Back"	7:53
13.	"Ebb Tide" (bonus track on some versions)	5:14

== Personnel ==
Credits adapted from liner notes.

- Emmett Kelly – guitar
- Dawn McCarthy – singing
- Paul Oldham – bass
- Valgeir Sigurðsson – recording, mixing
- Jim White – drums

== Charts ==
Chart	Peak position
Belgian Albums (Ultratop Flanders)	29
Belgian Albums (Ultratop Wallonia)	90
Dutch Albums (Album Top 100)	66
French Albums (SNEP)	100
Norwegian Albums (VG-lista)	29
Swedish Albums (Sverigetopplistan)	56
UK Albums (OCC)	70
US Billboard 200	194
US Heatseekers Albums (Billboard)	8
US Independent Albums (Billboard)	17
US Tastemaker Albums (Billboard)	10
