= There Is No-One What Will Take Care of You =

Studio album by Palace Brothers
- Released: 1993
- Genre: Country
- Length: 42:56
- Label: Drag City

Will Oldham / Palace chronology
There Is No-One What Will Take Care of You (1993)	Days in the Wake (1994)

There Is No-One What Will Take Care of You is the debut studio album by Will Oldham. It was released under the band name Palace Brothers on Drag City in 1993. Oldham is accompanied by several members of Louisville rock band Slint.

== Critical reception ==
Professional ratings
Review scores
Source	Rating
AllMusic	3/5 stars
Chicago Tribune	3/4 stars
The Encyclopedia of Popular Music	4/5 stars
The Guardian	5/5 stars
The Philadelphia Inquirer	3/4 stars
Q	4/5 stars
Select	4/5
Spin Alternative Record Guide	7/10
Uncut	5/5 stars

The Toronto Star labeled the album "quietly beautiful and slightly askew". The album was included in Mojo magazine's book The Mojo Collection: The Greatest Albums of All Time (2001).

== Track listing ==
All tracks are written by Will Oldham, except where noted.

No.	Title	Length
1.	"Idle Hands Are the Devil's Playthings"	2:06
2.	"Long Before"	6:12
3.	"I Tried to Stay Healthy for You"	3:30
4.	"The Cellar Song"	3:51
5.	"(I Was Drunk at the) Pulpit"	3:51
6.	"There Is No-One What Will Take Care of You"	2:55
7.	"O Lord Are You in Need?"	2:58
8.	"Merida"	3:38
9.	"King Me"	3:49
10.	"I Had a Good Mother and Father" (Washington Phillips)	2:54
11.	"Riding"	4:23
12.	"O Paul"	2:49

== Personnel ==
- Grant Barger – organ, acoustic guitar, bass guitar, background vocals
- Todd Brashear – lap steel guitar, electric guitar, bass guitar, drums, shakers, harmonies
- Paul Greenlaw – banjo, additional vocals
- Brian McMahan – electric guitar, bass guitar, drums
- Britt Walford – electric guitar, bass guitar, drums
- Will Oldham – vocals, guitar
