= Will Oldham =

American singer-songwriter and actor (born 1970)

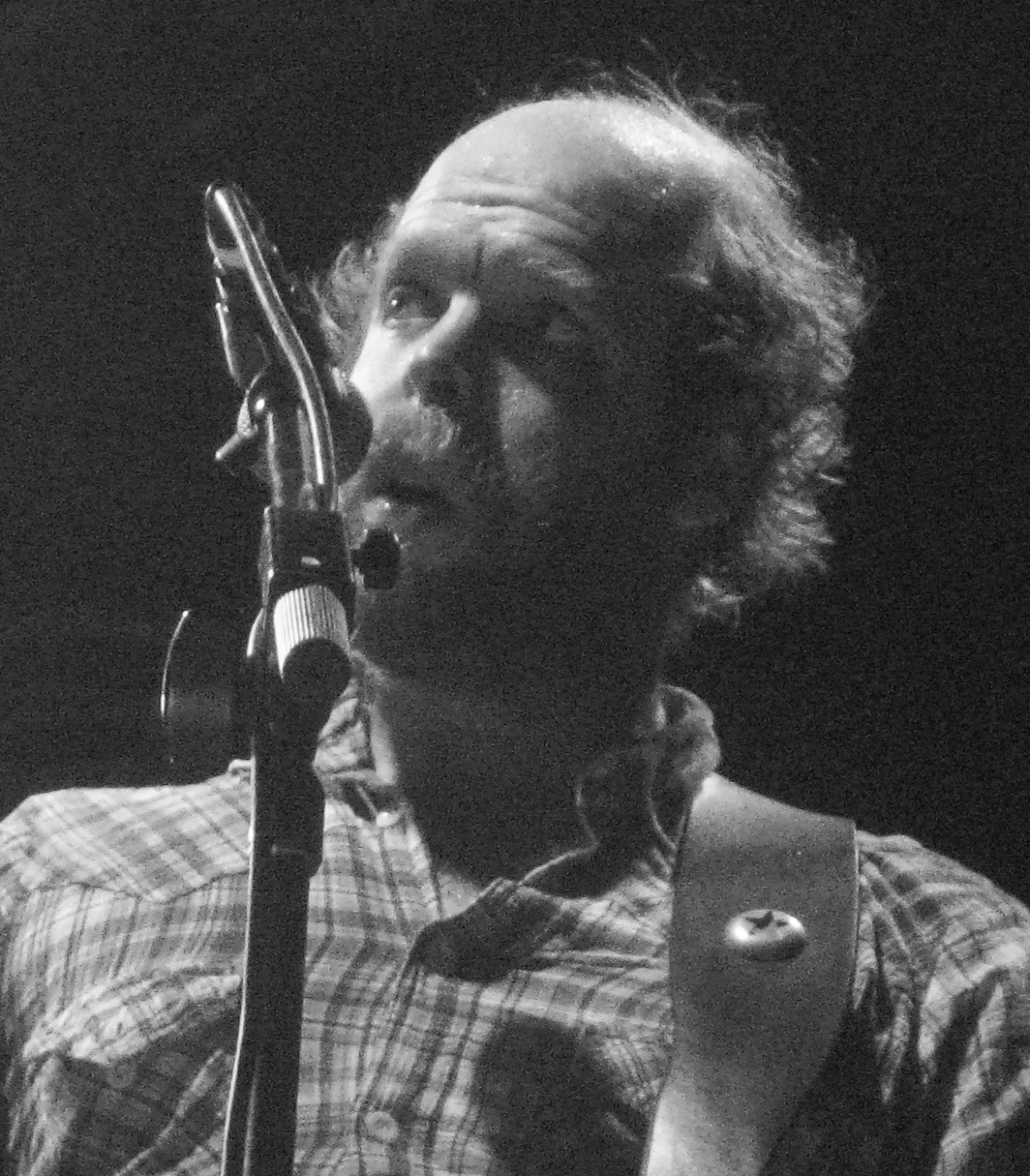
- Oldham in 2009

Background information
- Also known as: Palace Brothers; Palace Music; Palace Songs; Bonnie "Prince" Billy
- Born: Joseph Will Oldham; January 15, 1970 (age 56); Louisville, Kentucky, U.S.
- Genres: Country rock; freak folk; gothic country; lo-fi; indie folk; alternative country
- Years active: 1993–present
- Labels: Drag City; Domino; Spunk
- Spouse: Elsa Hansen Oldham (m. 2016)
- Children: 1
- Website: bonnieprincebilly.com

Joseph Will Oldham (born January 15, 1970) is an American singer-songwriter and actor. From 1993 to 1997, he performed and recorded in collaboration with dozens of other musicians under variations of Palace (Palace, Palace Brothers, Palace Songs, and Palace Music). After briefly publishing music under his own name, in 1998 he adopted Bonnie "Prince" Billy as the name for most of his work.

== Early life and education ==
Oldham was born on January 15, 1970, in Louisville, Kentucky. His mother, Joanne Lei Will Tafel Oldham, was a teacher and artist. His father, Joseph Collins Oldham, was an attorney and photographer. Oldham graduated from the J. Graham Brown School in 1988. He sporadically attended Brown University in Rhode Island while pursuing a career as an actor, and living between Brooklyn, Los Angeles, and Bloomington, Indiana. He began making music during this time, initially as a project for his professor Jeff Todd Titon, an ethnomusicologist at Brown University.

== Career ==
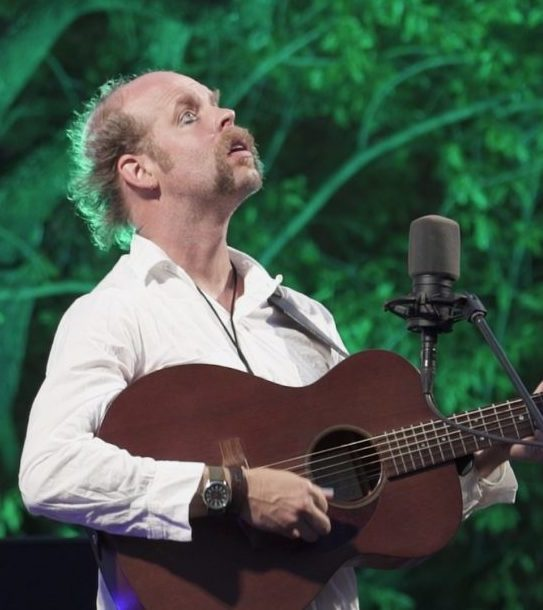
Oldham in 2017

Oldham first performed and recorded under various permutations of the Palace name, including Palace Brothers, Palace Songs, Palace Music, and simply Palace. Regarding the name changes during this period (1993–1997), Oldham said:

I guess the idea is that when you have a name of a group or an artist, then you expect that the next record, if it has the same name, should be the same group of people playing on it. And I just thought we were making a different kind of record each time, with different people, and different themes, and different sounds. So I thought it was important to call it something different so that people would be aware of the differences.

Will stated in a 1995 interview with KCRW that the name Palace Flophouse was inspired by reading John Steinbeck's Cannery Row. Beginning in 1998, Oldham has primarily used the moniker Bonnie 'Prince' Billy, which draws inspiration from several sources:

[T]he name has so many different references that it could almost have a life of its own. Bonnie Prince Charlie has such a beautiful ring to it, and I was very conscious of appropriating that mellifluous sound. And I was also thinking about the name Nat King Cole. But it wasn't until later, and this may have been subconscious, that I remembered that Billy the Kid was William Bonney or Billy Bonney.

He has explained that "the primary purpose of the pseudonym is to allow both the audience and the performer to have a relationship with the performer that is valid and unbreakable."

Many of his solo albums are not available on Spotify, as Oldham disagrees with how they treat musicians.

=== Critical reception ===
Oldham is known for his "do-it-yourself punk aesthetic and blunt honesty", and his music has been likened to Americana, folk, roots, country, punk, and indie rock. He has been called an "Appalachian post-punk solipsist", with a voice that has been described as "a fragile sort-of warble frittering around haunted melodies in the American folk or country tradition."

Some of his albums, such as There Is No-One What Will Take Care of You (1993), Viva Last Blues (1995), and I See a Darkness (1999), have appeared on greatest albums lists.

Johnny Cash recorded a version of "I See a Darkness" on his American Recordings disc American III: Solitary Man (2000). Oldham provided backing vocals. Spanish singer Rosalía also recorded a version of "I See a Darkness" for her debut album Los Ángeles. Marianne Faithfull included Oldham's "A King at Night" on her 2003 Kissin Time tour. Steve Adey also covered "I See a Darkness" on his 2006 LP All Things Real. Mark Kozelek recorded a version of Oldham's "New Partner" on his 2008 disc, The Finally LP. Katatonia covered "Oh How I Enjoy the Light" on their 2001 EP Tonight's Music, and their song "Don't Tell a Soul" is about and contains an interpolation of the Palace Brothers song "You Will Miss Me When I Burn". In 2009 Mark Lanegan and Soulsavers recorded a cover version of "You Will Miss Me When I Burn". The release is a split single, backed with the Lanegan-penned "Sunrise" featuring vocals by Oldham. In 2011, Deer Tick's cover of Oldham's song "Death to Everyone" appeared in an episode of Hell On Wheels. Cadaverous Condition covered "Black" on their To the Night Sky album (2006).

=== Acting ===
==== Film and television ====
Oldham's first film acting role was as the teen preacher in John Sayles's film Matewan (1987), a dramatization of the life of Appalachian mining community in the 1920s and the Battle of Matewan. Following this, he moved to Hollywood to pursue a career as an actor. He played the role of Chip McClure (father of Baby Jessica) in Everybody's Baby: The Rescue of Jessica McClure (1989), and the role of Miles in the film Thousand Pieces of Gold (1991). Oldham also played minor roles in Julien Donkey-Boy (1999), Junebug (2005), and The Guatemalan Handshake (2006).

In 2004, Oldham appeared as himself in the short documentary film Tripping With Caveh, wherein he took psilocybin mushrooms with autobiographical filmmaker Caveh Zahedi. The project was intended as the pilot episode of a reality/documentary series, with the concept being that Zahedi would take psychedelics in the company of a different celebrity in each episode. The project was never picked up by a television network, but the short with Oldham finally saw official release in the 2015 retrospective box set Digging My Own Grave: The Films of Caveh Zahedi.

Oldham played a lead role as Kurt in Kelly Reichardt's film Old Joy (2006), and had a brief role in the director's next film Wendy and Lucy (2008). Oldham played Pastor Pigmeat in the "Horse Apples" episode of the second season of the MTV children's show parody Wonder Showzen and appeared in an episode of Chatman and Lee's subsequent television show, Xavier: Renegade Angel as a Reverend. In 2007, he starred alongside Zach Galifianakis in a music video for Kanye West's "Can't Tell Me Nothing".

Also in 2010, Oldham appeared in Jackass 3D as a gorilla trainer. As part of an agreement to play that role, he wrote a theme song, in the style of a Saturday-morning cartoon show, for filmmaker Lance Bangs.

In 2011, Oldham played a father telling a bedtime story to his son in David Lowery's short film Pioneer. In 2017, he appeared as "Prognosticator" in the feature film A Ghost Story, also directed by David Lowery.

==== Voice work ====
In 2009, Oldham narrated Madam and Little Boy, a documentary film about atomic weapons, directed by Swedish artist Magnus Bärtås. In 2010, Oldham narrated Music Makes a City, a documentary about the formation of the Louisville Orchestra, directed by Owsley Brown III and Jerome Hiler. Oldham provided voice work and inspiration for the character "Will" in the video game Kentucky Route Zero, released in 2013.

== Personal life ==
Oldham married the textile artist Elsa Hansen in 2016. Their child was born in 2018.

== Discography ==
=== Studio albums ===
- There Is No-One What Will Take Care of You – Palace Brothers (1993)
- Days in the Wake – Palace Brothers (1994)
- Viva Last Blues – Palace Music (1995)
- Arise Therefore – Palace Music (1996)
- Joya – Will Oldham (1997)
- I See a Darkness – Bonnie "Prince" Billy (1999)
- Ease Down the Road – Bonnie "Prince" Billy (2001)
- Master and Everyone – Bonnie "Prince" Billy (2003)
- Sings Greatest Palace Music – Bonnie "Prince" Billy (2004) (reworkings of earlier songs)
- Superwolf – Matt Sweeney & Bonnie "Prince" Billy (2005)
- The Brave and the Bold – Tortoise & Bonnie "Prince" Billy (2006) (covers album)
- The Letting Go – Bonnie "Prince" Billy (2006)
- Lie Down in the Light – Bonnie "Prince" Billy (2008)
- Beware – Bonnie "Prince" Billy (2009)
- The Wonder Show of the World – Bonnie "Prince" Billy and the Cairo Gang (2010)
- Wolfroy Goes to Town – Bonnie "Prince" Billy (2011)
- Bonnie "Prince" Billy – Bonnie "Prince" Billy (2013) (EP)
- Singer's Grave – A Sea of Tongues – Bonnie "Prince" Billy (2014) (reworkings of songs from Wolfroy Goes to Town)
- Epic Jammers and Fortunate Little Ditties – Bitchin Bajas and Bonnie "Prince" Billy (2016)
- Best Troubador – Bonnie "Prince" Billy (2017) (covers of Merle Haggard songs)
- Wolf of the Cosmos – Bonnie "Prince" Billy (2017) (cover of Sonata Mix Dwarf Cosmos by Susanna)
- Songs of Love and Horror – Will Oldham (2018) (reworkings of earlier songs)
- I Made a Place – Bonnie "Prince" Billy (2019)
- Superwolves – Matt Sweeney & Bonnie "Prince" Billy (2021)
- Blind Date Party – Bill Callahan & Bonnie "Prince" Billy (2021) (covers)
- Keeping Secrets Will Destroy You – Bonnie "Prince" Billy (2023)
- The Purple Bird - Bonnie "Prince" Billy (2025)
- We Are Together Again - Bonnie "Prince" Billy (2026)

== Filmography ==
=== Film ===
Year	Title	Role	Notes
1985	What Comes Around	Young Tom Hawkins	
1987	Matewan	Danny Radnor	
1990	Thousand Pieces of Gold	Miles	
1999	Radiation	Will	
1999	Julien Donkey-Boy	Partygoer	Uncredited
2005	Junebug	Bill Mooney, scout	
2006	Old Joy	Kurt	
2006	The Guatemalan Handshake	Donald Turnupseed	
2007	Trapped in the Closet: Chapters 13–22	Sgt. Platoon	Part of the series Trapped in the Closet
2007	Trapped in the Closet: The BIG Package	Sgt. Platoon	The BIG Package covers Chapters 1–22; Oldham appears in 13–22
2008	Wendy and Lucy	Icky	
2010	Jackass 3D	Himself	Guest appearance
2011	New Jerusalem	Ike Evans	
2014	Eden	John	
2017	A Ghost Story	Prognosticator	
2023	The Bikeriders	Bartender	

=== Television ===
Year	Title	Role	Notes
1989	Everybody's Baby: The Rescue of Jessica McClure	Chip Mcclure	Television film
2006	Wonder Showzen	Pastor Pigmeat	Episode: "Horse Apples"
2007	Trapped in the Closet	Sgt. Platoon	Chapters 13–22 and The BIG Package (covers Chapters 1–22; Oldham appears in 13–22)
2008	Xavier: Renegade Angel	Reverend (voice)	Episode: "Signs from Godrilla"
2018	Animals	Father Ferret (voice)	Episode: "At a Loss for Words When We Needed Them Most or... The Rise and Fall of GrabBagVille"
2020	The Midnight Gospel	Bubble Max (voice)	Episode: "Vulture with Honor"
