= Spiderland =

1991 studio album by Slint

- Cover photograph by Will Oldham Left to right: Brashear, McMahan, Walford, Pajo

Studio album by Slint
- Released: March 27, 1991
- Recorded: August 1990
- Studio: River North (Chicago)
- Genres: Post-rock; post-hardcore; math rock
- Length: 39:31
- Label: Touch and Go
- Producer: Brian Paulson (credited as engineer)

Slint chronology
Tweez (1989)	Spiderland (1991)	Untitled (1994)

Spiderland is the second and final studio album by the American rock band Slint. It was released by Touch and Go Records on March 27, 1991. Slint's lineup at the time of recording comprised Brian McMahan (vocals, guitar), David Pajo (guitar), Todd Brashear (bass), and Britt Walford (drums). Spiderland was engineered by Brian Paulson and recorded over four days in August 1990. The music and vocal melodies were composed throughout the summer of 1990, while lyrics were written in-studio.

Forming in 1986 in Louisville, Kentucky, Slint had met as teenagers playing in the Midwestern punk scene but soon diverged sonically from their hardcore punk roots. By the time they recorded Spiderland in mid-1990, the band had developed a complex, idiosyncratic sound characterized by atypical rhythmic meters, harmonic dissonance and irregular song structures. McMahan's vocal delivery on the record alternates between spoken word, singing and shouting. The lyrics are presented in a narrative style and cover themes such as unease, social anxiety, loneliness, and despair.

Slint broke up shortly before the album's release due to McMahan's depression. In the US, Spiderland initially attracted little critical attention and sold poorly. However, a warm reception from UK music papers and gradually increasing sales in subsequent years helped it develop a significant cult following. Spiderland is widely regarded as foundational to the 1990s post-rock and math rock movements, and is cited by critics as a milestone of indie and experimental rock, inspiring myriad subsequent artists. Slint reunited in 2005 to perform the album in its entirety across three international tours.

== Background ==
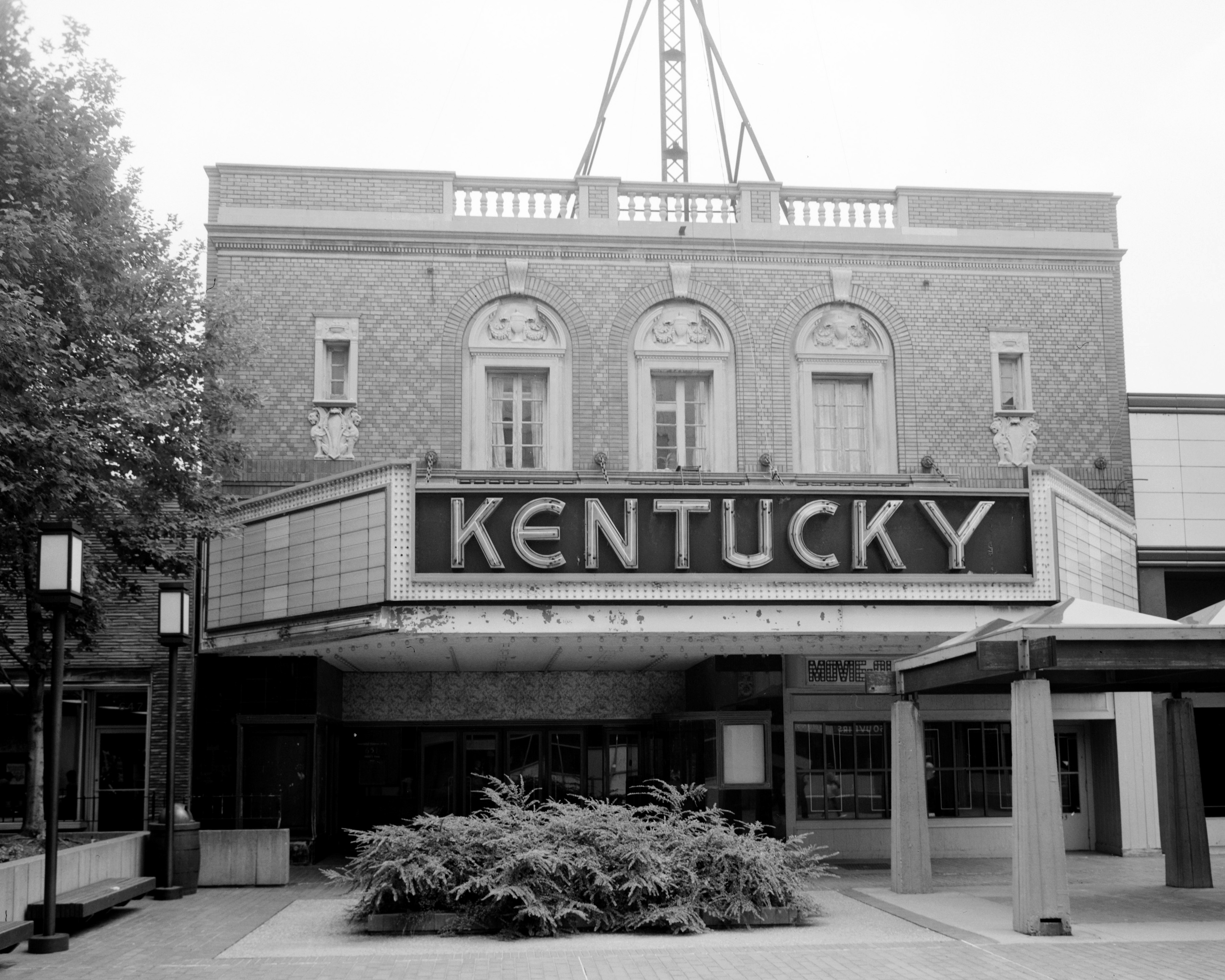
Before recording Spiderland, Slint performed instrumental versions of their new songs during a concert at the Kentucky Theater (pictured in undated photo) on June 23, 1990.

Slint formed in 1986 in Louisville, Kentucky, after the dissolution of two local bands: Squirrel Bait and Maurice. The founding members included David Pajo (guitar), Britt Walford (drums) and Ethan Buckler (bass guitar), with Brian McMahan (guitar, vocals) joining soon after their first performance. Their debut album Tweez was recorded by Steve Albini and released in 1989 on the group's self-owned record label Jennifer Hartman Records and Tapes. Buckler left the band out of dissatisfaction with Tweez, and was replaced with Todd Brashear. Their second recording was an untitled extended play (EP) commonly referred to as Slint. Its instrumental rock sound featured on the EP, which would not be released until 1994, reflected both their new direction and increased musical sophistication since writing and recording their debut album.

The 1989 studio recordings drew the attention of Corey Rusk, co-founder of Touch and Go Records. He said that the album "was just so radically different than Tweez. ... I remember getting a tape of that and just listening to it over and over, really fucking loud." By early 1990, Rusk had agreed to pay for studio time and committed to release their next record with Touch and Go. In July 1989, two weeks after the release of Tweez, Slint supported concerts by Crain and King Kong at which they debuted early versions of the songs: "Nosferatu Man", "Breadcrumb Trail", "Good Morning, Captain" and "Washer". That June, they performed nearly finalized instrumental renditions of the Spiderland songs during a concert at the Kentucky Theater.

== Production and recording ==
Throughout the summer of 1990, the band practiced the music for six new songs McMahan and Walford had written for Slint's second album. The songs were recorded in August 1990 with producer Brian Paulson, who was known for his "live" recording style and minimal takes. Paulson later said that the recording "was weird... because I remember sitting there, and I just knew there was something about it. I've never heard anything like this." McMahan and Walford wrote the lyrics at the last minute while in studio, although they had worked out the vocal melodies in advance using recordings of practice sessions and a four-track. The album mostly explored themes of coming of age and anxiety about the approach of adulthood, and McMahan did not want the lyrics or vocal style to be heard by others until the actual recordings. He said: "I did not want to rehearse the vocals...it was a one-shot, cathartic experience."

The recording sessions were intense, fraught, and often difficult. According to AllMusic, they were "traumatic...and one more piece of evidence supporting the theory that band members had to be periodically institutionalized during the completion of the album." Rumors circulated that at least one member of Slint had checked into a psychiatric hospital. Walford later said that there was no truth to such claims, although the band was "definitely trying to be serious about things, pretty intense, which made recording the album kinda stressful." The recording was completed in four days.

== Music ==
"Breadcrumb Trail"
A sample of "Breadcrumb Trail", the opening track from Slint's 1991 album, Spiderland. This sample contains part of the song's verse, bridge, and chorus.

"Good Morning, Captain"
A sample of "Good Morning, Captain", the sixth track from Spiderland. This sample contains part of the song's second verse.

The album's guitar work is noted for its roomy sound, angular rhythms, dramatically alternating dynamic shifts, and irregular time signatures. McMahan's singing style varies among mumbling, spoken word, strained shouting, and a written-narrative style. Will Hermes of Spin summarized the album's sound as "mid-'70s King Crimson gone emo: screeching guitar chords and gorgeous note-spinning in odd-metered instrumentals speckled with words both spoken and sung". Steve Albini, writing for Melody Maker, described the music as "structurally and in tone", saying that the band "recall[s] Television circa Marquee Moon and Crazy Horse, whose simplicity they echo and whose style they most certainly do not".

The lyrics are usually narrative in style, and have been described as "eerie" and having "peculiar syntax". Both the vocal melodies and words were written by McMahan and Walford after the basic tracks had been recorded during practice sessions, and often were not heard by Pajo and Brashear until their final recording in studio. The vocal additions often pulled the songs in new directions, with examples being "Good Morning, Captain" and "Washer". McMahan was never comfortable taking the role of vocalist and only did so because nobody else in the band would. He considerably increases his range on Spiderland, incorporating both his earlier whispered and shouting approaches with what biographer Scott Tennent describes as conventional, "actual singing".

The opening track, "Breadcrumb Trail", describes a day at a carnival with a fortune-teller. The song is built from complex guitar arrangement with sharp transitions, during which the guitar fluctuates between a clean-sounding riff with harmonics in the verse to heavy and high pitched distortion in the chorus. "Nosferatu Man" is the second track and was inspired by the 1922 German Expressionist silent film Nosferatu. Its verse includes a dissonant guitar riff which uses high-pitched notes similar to those in "Breadcrumb Trail" and a drumbeat centered on snare and toms. The chorus, featuring "jagged" distorted guitar and a beat with "thrashing cymbals with quick drum fills", segues into an extended groove before the song ends with 30 seconds of feedback.

Walford sings and plays lead guitar on "Don, Aman", a deliberate anagram of Madonna. Delivered in a hushed tone, the song's ambiguous lyrics depict the thoughts of an "isolated soul" before, during, and after an evening at a bar. The tempo quickens as the song develops, becoming loud and distorted at its peak, before slowing back to the original speed. "Washer" is the album's longest track, and features a low volume intro with guitar and cymbals before the rest of the band joins in the recording. The song builds until the final verse, when the tension is broken by loud distortion, followed by a lengthy outro. Pajo has said he is particularly proud of the song's one-note guitar solo, admitting that "at that point in my life, if someone asked me to do a solo, I would do the exact opposite of what a solo usually is. Instead of playing a bunch of notes, I would just play one, though I did some decorative stuff around it there. There’re some cool, weird things in that song".

The instrumental "For Dinner..." begins with a quiet section of "brooding chords throb[bing] with the occasional rumble of muted toms and bass drum", the song cycles through sections of building and releasing tension. The guitars employ standard tuning, and do not use effects pedals. The closing song, "Good Morning, Captain", has been described as a tribute to the Samuel Taylor Coleridge poem The Rime of the Ancient Mariner but the band have denied this. The song, which Pajo says is his favorite from the album, is built from a two-chord guitar structure, described as a "spindly, tight riff", and a "jerky" drumbeat. During the recording of the final chorus, McMahan became physically sick due to the strain of yelling over the guitars. David Peschek of The Guardian compared "Good Morning, Captain" to Led Zeppelin for its epic scope, though not its bleak mood, writing: "the extraordinary [song] is [Slint's] "Stairway to Heaven", if it's possible to imagine Stairway to Heaven bleached of all bombast."

== Title and packaging ==
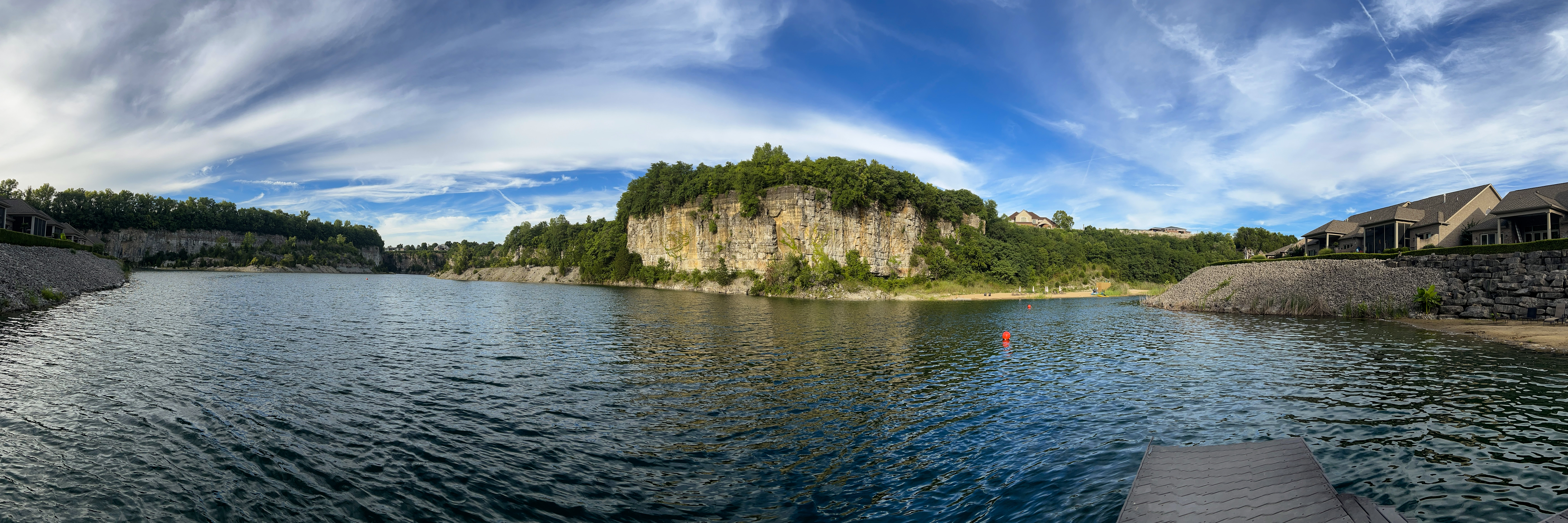
Panorama of the quarry lake in Utica Township, Indiana, as of August 2022. The black-and-white cover of Spiderland shows the members of Slint bathing in the secluded lake.

The title originates from McMahan's younger brother, who thought the record sounded "spidery". Its black-and-white cover photograph depicts the band members treading water in the lake of an abandoned quarry in Utica, Indiana. The photograph was taken by the musician Will Oldham, who was friends with the band and whose father had taken the photograph on the cover of Tweez. The Stranger credits the image as responsible for the later mystique surrounding the publicity-shy band, and notes how "most people only had seen Slint as four heads floating in a Kentucky quarry on Spiderland's cover. Listeners pondered the band's sparsely adorned black-and-white covers as if they were runes bearing secrets."

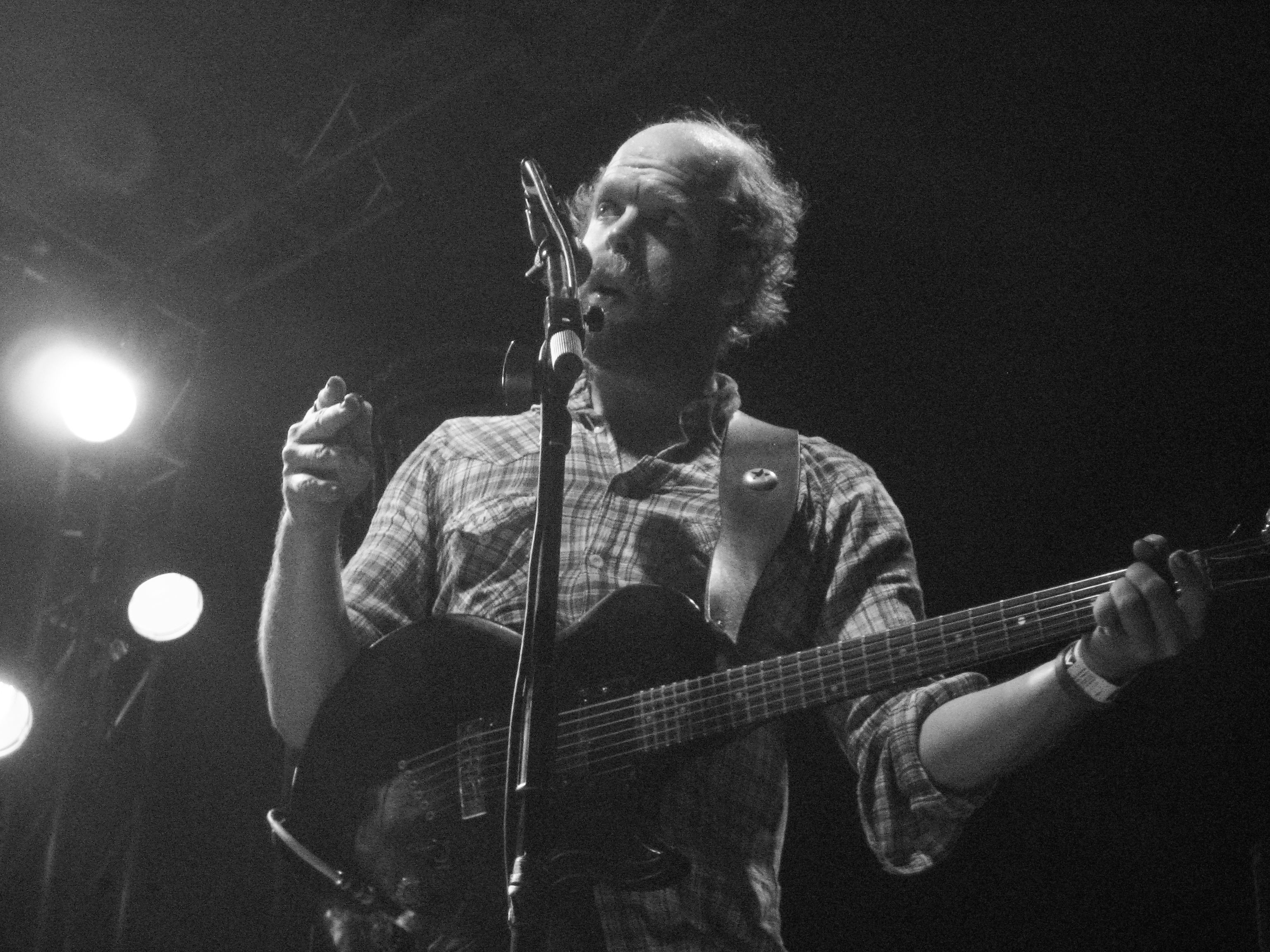
The Spiderland cover photograph was shot by Will Oldham (pictured in 2009), a friend of the band and later musical collaborator with a number of its members.

Chris Gaerig of the Michigan Daily wrote that the album cover "captures the joyous fear and violence of the album so precisely it shakes souls. The group—submerged in a lake to their chins with deranged smiles—seems to be stalking you, hovering out of the black-and-white façade." Several other promotional images have been taken from the same photo session with Oldham.

The photograph on the back cover is of a dead wolf spider, taken by Noel Saltzman, who also took the uncredited cover photo for their untitled 1994 EP. Saltzman found the spider in a shed while working his summer job. As it would not remain still enough to be photographed, Saltzman killed, froze, and repositioned it with tweezers to take the shot. The inside sleeve contains the message "interested female vocalists write 1864 douglas blvd. louisville, ky. 40205". The words "this recording is meant to be listened to on vinyl" is printed on some CD issues, indicating Slint's preference for analog audio devices.

== Reception ==
Professional ratings
Reviews prior to the 2014 reissue
Review scores
Source	Rating
All Music Guide (2001, 4th ed.)	5/5 stars
Christgau's Consumer Guide (2000)	C+
The Encyclopedia of Popular Music (1998, 3rd ed.)	4/5 stars
Kerrang! (2011)	4/5
Melody Maker (1991)	"Ten fucking stars"
NME (1991)	7/10
The Rolling Stone Album Guide (2004, 4th ed.)	2.5/5 stars
Select (1991)	4/5
Spin Alternative Record Guide (1995)	8/10

The band had broken up by the time Touch and Go were preparing for the album's release. As a result, a planned tour of Europe was canceled and the album received minimal promotion. It thus failed to attract an audience, make an impression on college radio, or chart in either the US or the UK. The album went virtually unnoticed by the American music press or zines. Maximumrocknroll described it as "genius", but only during a passing mention midway through a column on the Kentucky scene. The writer for Flipside was unable to review the album as he had received a damaged copy from the label, and did not ask to have it replaced. McMahan admits that while the band did not seek to engage with journalists, "there wasn't really a huge infrastructure for getting information out on a broad scale. We definitely avoided it."

The UK music press were the first to report on the album. Edwin Pouncey reviewed it in the March 23, 1991 issue of NME, finding its sound indebted to Sonic Youth but concluding that "something original squirms at the core of Slint. Perhaps next time they'll reveal all." Albini, who produced Tweez, wrote a review for Melody Maker published the following week. He praised the music's originality and emotional intensity, as well as the clarity and immediacy of Paulson's production. He claimed that Tweez—which he produced—only "hints at their genius" but had little of the "staying power" manifested on Spiderland. He awarded the album "ten fucking stars" and predicted that it would rise in stature, writing "It's an amazing record ... and no one still capable of being moved by rock music should miss it. In 10 years it will be a landmark and you'll have to scramble to buy a copy then."

The album sold only a few thousand copies within the first year. Even a few years later, it was estimated to have sold fewer than 5,000 copies. Slint remained an obscure local act in the period leading up to the album's release. By the time it came out, the band had already broken up and its members had moved on to new projects, believing that Slint would be "just another blip".

In the February issue of Select, reviewer Mike Noon praised its "creeping success", but cautioned that the band's sound would take time to fully appreciate. In September 1992, Ben Thompson reviewed both Spiderland and Tweez for The Wire, and while the band's reputation had grown by that time, wrote that bands "like Pavement" were "hailing them as guiding lights for a new obliqueness". "It's not surprising these records confused people on first release", he wrote, in part because listeners had been primed to expect straightforward noise rock—a "total red herring" that concealed the band's "alarmingly introverted" sound. Thompson found Spiderland accessible but wrote that it "demands that you push your head up right close to the speakers (or buy some headphones) if you want to find out what is being said and sung." According to biographer Scott Tennent, the laudatory review of the Melody Maker failed to attract commercial interest, but over the years succeeded in rescuing the album from an otherwise-assured relegation to obscurity.

== Legacy ==
Spiderland is considered a major influence on the post-rock bands Godspeed You! Black Emperor, Isis and Explosions in the Sky. Lou Barlow of Dinosaur Jr. and Sebadoh said the album was "quiet-to-loud" while still sounding like nothing before, as if "a new kind of music." Mogwai's Stuart Braithwaite was struck by the "psychic playing" evident on Spiderland, stating "when I heard it, it was unlike anything I’d heard before. I still don’t know if I have heard anything else like it, now. Obviously a lot of bands take a lot from it – I know that we did." PJ Harvey included Spiderland in her 1992 "Ten For Today" list of records, while Bob Nastanovich of Pavement ranked it as among his favorite albums.

Its cover was recreated by The Shins in the music video for "New Slang", and paid homage by Fugazi's album "Red Medicine". The album is regarded as essential to "the fabric of math-rock genre". Peschek described it as "the ur-text for what became known as post-rock, a fractured, almost geometric reimagining of rock music stripped of its dionysiac impulse." Rachel Devine of The List called Spiderland "arguably the most disproportionately influential [album] in music history". Pitchfork's Stuart Berman noted how the album "motivated a cluster of semi-popular bands in the late-90s and early 2000s to adopt its whisper-to-scream schematic. It's the boundless inspiration it perpetually provides for all the bands that have yet to emerge from the basement." In 2015, Gigwise named the album in their list of "The 11 most vicious post-hardcore albums ever."

In the 2010s, AllMusic's Mark Deming described it as one of the most singular and important albums of the '90s, and in 2003, Pitchfork named it the twelfth best album of the 1990s. Fact magazine would also rate it the third best album of the 1990s. In 2024, The Independent ranked it number five on their list of the 20 most underrated albums ever. Writing in 2000, Robert Christgau was less enthusiastic, and said that despite their "sad-sack affect", Slint are actually "art-rockers without the courage of their pretensions", and noted that the lyrics were not to his liking. In The New Rolling Stone Album Guide, journalist Mac Randall felt even though it is more accessible than Tweez, "[t]he absence of anything resembling a tune continues to nag". Touch and Go founder Corey Rusk observed how Spiderland is "like an icon now. But when it came out, nobody cared! The band had broken up by the time the album came out, and it really didn't sell particularly well or get written about all that much in the year it was released. But it was a revolutionary, groundbreaking record, and it's one of the few instances where people catch up to it later on."

=== Reunions ===
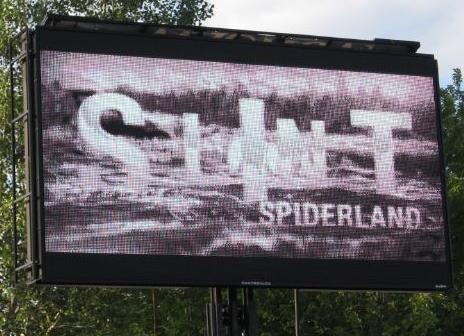
Billboard promoting Slint's performance of the album at the 2007 Pitchfork Music Festival

After Slint's break-up in November 1990, the members went on to play in other projects, notably Tortoise, The Breeders, Palace and The For Carnation. They reunited briefly in 2005 for an eighteen-date tour. Pajo said that they didn't "want to be a reunion band that keeps reuniting. ... I know that this is going to be it." Their 2007 performance of the album at All Tomorrow's Parties' "Don't Look Back" concert series celebrating classic albums lead to a tour that included an appearance at the 2007 Pitchfork Music Festival and Primavera Sound festival.

Critics differed in their assessment of the reunion. Some viewed the band's studio-based music as fundamentally unsuited to a live setting. Jim DeRogatis of the Chicago Sun-Times wrote that although "fans greeted [Slint's performance at the Pitchfork Music Festival] as manna from heaven. [...] the musicians' fragile, intertwining guitar lines, mumbled attempts at poetry and uninspiring shoegazer personas were poor matches for the setting and the occasion." Both DeRogatis and The A.V. Club noted that the band's performance was plagued by sound problems. According to Vulture reviewer Nick Catucci, their "deeply brooding, fussily-executed album finally sounded, sixteen years later...like the existential, cosmos-annihilating shrug it was envisioned as. Which is to say: It sounded fucking great."

== Remastered box set ==
Spiderland (remastered)

Box set by Slint
- Released: April 15, 2014
- Recorded: 1989–1992
- Length: 118:35 + DVD
- Label: Touch and Go
- Producer: Bob Weston (remastering)

Professional ratings
2014 box set
Aggregate scores
Source	Rating
Metacritic	99/100
Review scores
Source	Rating
AllMusic	5/5 stars
The A.V. Club	A
Clash	10/10
Mojo	5/5 stars
Paste	9.0/10
Pitchfork	10/10
PopMatters	9/10
Q	4/5 stars
Record Collector	5/5 stars
Uncut	9/10

In 2014, Touch and Go reissued Tweez and a version of Spiderland remastered by Bob Weston from the original analog master-tapes. The bonus tracks were selected by the band and include demos, outtakes and a live performance. The transitional songs (written after Tweez, but before the bulk of the Spiderland tracks) "Pam" and "Glenn" (whose recording has been described as containing one of the best drum sounds Albini ever achieved) were recorded during the Spiderland sessions but failed to make the album.

== Track listing ==
All songs written by Slint, except track 3 which was exclusively written by Britt Walford.

No.	Title	Length
1.	"Breadcrumb Trail"	5:55
2.	"Nosferatu Man"	5:35
3.	"Don, Aman"	6:28
4.	"Washer"	8:50
5.	"For Dinner..."	5:05
6.	"Good Morning, Captain"	7:38
Total length:		39:31

Digital bonus track
No.	Title	Length
7.	"Utica Quarry, Nighttime"	15:38
Total length:		55:09

2014 Deluxe Remastered Version
No.	Title	Length
1.	"Breadcrumb Trail" (Remastered)	5:54
2.	"Nosferatu Man" (Remastered)	5:34
3.	"Don, Aman" (Remastered)	6:27
4.	"Washer" (Remastered)	8:49
5.	"For Dinner..." (Remastered)	5:05
6.	"Good Morning, Captain" (Remastered)	7:41
7.	"Nosferatu Man" (Basement practice)	7:05
8.	"Washer" (Basement practice)	4:48
9.	"Good Morning, Captain" (Demo)	7:34
10.	"Pam" (Rough mix of Spiderland outtake)	4:44
11.	"Glenn" (Spiderland outtake)	7:59
12.	"Todd's Song" (Post-Spiderland song in progress)	7:22
13.	"Brian's Song" (Post-Spiderland demo)	5:57
14.	"Cortez the Killer" (Live in Chicago, Illinois, March 3, 1989)	8:36
15.	"Washer" (4-track vocal demo)	7:21
16.	"Nosferatu Man" (4-track vocal demo)	5:23
17.	"Pam" (4-track vocal demo)	3:33
18.	"Good Morning, Captain" (Evanston Riff tape)	0:45
19.	"Nosferatu Man" (Evanston Riff tape)	3:18
20.	"Pam" (Evanston Riff tape)	4:39
Total length:		118:34

== Personnel ==
The album packaging omitted the band members' names. The lineup credits below are adapted from The Great Alternative & Indie Discography (1999) by Martin C. Strong. Walford performed vocals and guitar on "Don, Aman", accompanied by Pajo on guitar.

Slint

- Todd Brashear – bass guitar (ext. 3)
- David Pajo – guitars
- Brian McMahan – vocals (tracks 1–4, 6); guitar (ext. 3)
- Britt Walford – drums (ext. 3); vocals (tracks 2, 3, 6); guitar (track 3)

Other personnel

- Will Oldham – photography ("band photo")
- Brian Paulson – engineering
- Noel Saltzman – photography ("spider photo")

== Release history ==
Release dates and formats for Spiderland
Region	Date	Label(s)	Format(s)
Various	March 27, 1991	Touch and Go Records	CD; vinyl; MC
United States & Canada	1995	Touch and Go Records	CD
USA	Jan 20, 2004	Touch and Go Records	Vinyl
USA	2011	Touch and Go Records	CD
USA, Canada and Japan	2014	Touch and Go Records	CD, vinyl
USA	2022	Touch and Go Records	Vinyl

== Accolades ==
Publication	Country	Accolade	Year	Rank
Pitchfork	United States	Top 100 Albums of the 1990s	1999	12
NME	United Kingdom	The 500 Greatest Albums Of All Time	2013	314
Spin	United States	100 Greatest Albums, 1985–2005	2005	94
