= The Glasspack =

American band

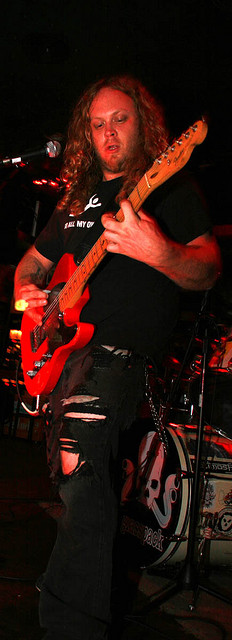
- The Glasspack performing at Rotture in Portland, Oregon, on November 10, 2007

Background information
- Also known as: The Pack
- Origin: Louisville, Kentucky, United States
- Genres: Stoner rock, psychedelic rock, heavy metal, hardcore punk, blues rock
- Years active: 1999–present
- Labels: Small Stone Records, Sleeping Village Records, 4 Walls Records, Noise Pollution Records, Riverock Records, Better Days Records, Mother Lodge Records, Beer City Records, Poison Tree Records, Gubbey Records
- Members: "Dirty" Dave Johnson; Nick Hall; Peter Searcy; Tony Rymniak
- Website: www.facebook.com/theGlasspack

The Glasspack is an American psychedelic punk rock band from Louisville, Kentucky, United States. The band was formed in 1999 by frontman and native Louisvillian "Dirty" Dave Johnson, in hopes of giving a better alternative to the classic and hard rock played over-and-over on the radio. The Glasspack has since recorded one garage EP, two garage albums, two studio albums, and numerous cover songs, as well as toured the U.S. relentlessly. Three of the LPs were released on Detroit's Small Stone Records. The band takes its name from the high-flow fiber-glass filled automobile muffler known as a glasspack, which are known for being louder than traditional mufflers.

The band's music from their 2004 release Bridgeburner has been featured in MTV shows Viva La Bam (Season 3, Episodes 7&8) and Homewrecker (Season 1, Episodes 104&107). Also the band's music from their 2007 release Dirty Women was used in FX's motorcycle club television show Sons of Anarchy (Season 2, Episode 209). The band also has tracks from its 2002 Powderkeg release in video games MLB 2K and Amped 3, both made by 2K Sports. Amped 3 came with the package release of the Xbox 360.

The band's 2007 album, Dirty Women from Small Stone Records, landed them a sold-out headlining spot for their first trip to Europe at Netherlands' Roadburn Festival on April 20, 2008. The festival was sponsored by Roadburn magazine and Terrorizer and took place annually at the 013 Pop Centre in Tilburg.

The Glasspack was included in the internationally distributed book Rock Detector: A to Z of Doom, Gothic & Stoner Metal, published in 2003 by Cherry Red Books.

== History ==
In 1999, The Glasspack started playing in their hometown of Louisville, Kentucky opening for such known bands as My Own Victim, The Frogs, and Melt Banana. A few months later with only 4 songs, The Glasspack recorded a demo with Crain's Jon Cook in the infamous Rocket House in Old Louisville. They immediately sent the demo to Man's Ruin Records. Owned by well-known graphic artist Frank Kozik and operated in San Francisco, CA, the label had a reputation of putting out unknown psychedelic rock bands of all sorts. Kozik responded warmly to the band and proposed to release their first record.

The band enthusiastically accepted the offer and began recording their first full-length recording, American Exhaust in late 1999. Unfortunately for the band, Man's Ruin Records started to fold soon after, leaving the band with a hefty engineering bill. "Dirty" Dave decided to take out a high rate loan and start the record label Riverock Records with the only intentions being that of releasing The Glasspack record, in hopes of repaying the bills. American Exhaust was released Jan. 1, 2001 and received amazing international press reviews from such as Maximum RocknRoll, Stonerrock.com, Aardschok, and Louisville's newspaper The Courier-Journal. The record then received some global distribution despite the fact that it was on a new record label with only one record. All copies sold-out in less than a year. The record, a following U.S. tour, and hype gained the attention of the developing stoner rock community and Detroit's Small Stone Records, which was soaking up some of the band residue left from the collapse of Man's Ruin Records. The band recorded the Road Warriors E.P. during 2000 in waiting for Man's Ruin Records to put out American Exhaust. The EP was released in 2000 by local Louisville record store/label Better Days Records. The band later yanked the EP from the market for poor sound quality.

In late 2001, The Glasspack signed on to Small Stone Records claiming they were the Hunter S. Thompson/Muhammad Ali of rock and roll (both are natives of Louisville). Around the end of 2001, The Glasspack was invited to play the label's showcase at CBGB's in Manhattan for the CMJ Music Marathon (College Music Journal). The showcase was featured on national television on ESPN2. Right before the CMJ gig, the band had just finished a U.S. tour (some gigs with Nebula) and recorded their second full-length release Powderkeg for Small Stone Records. Powderkeg was released in spring of 2002, followed by more and more shows. The band was working extensively during this period, touring over the United States. Near the end of 2002, the band grew tired and took a break until the spring of 2003.

In the spring of 2003 the band decided to record in an actual studio in another city. They chose Detroit's Rustbelt Studios upon suggestion from Small Stone Records. The band spent a weekend and exactly 36 hours making a very confused record entitled Bridgeburner. In the studio, fellow songwriter and bassist/guitarist Marcus Moody fell ill with what would later become a diagnosis of multiple sclerosis. This prevented the band member from finishing the recording, leaving drummer Brett Holsclaw and guitarist/singer "Dirty" Dave Johnson with no other choice but a fill-in bassist. The record was scheduled for release in fall of 2003 and the band booked another tour to promote the release of the record. Small Stone Records at the time of scheduled release had changed distribution in the U.S. to Nail/Allegro. Distribution details and negotiation delayed the release to spring of 2004. However, the band went ahead and toured for the record before its release.

The Glasspack's third full-length release Bridgeburner was released in spring 2004. Shortly thereafter, the band accepted an invite to play WFPK Public Radio Louisville's Live Lunch Series to promote the record. The live radio session was recorded as well (with bassist Todd Cook). The Bridgeburner fell short of The Glasspack releases before it in the U.S. press and market. However, at this time, the band was gaining ground with live shows and starting to sell more records in Europe. The Bridgeburner record, a blur of guitars and psychedelic confusion, was actually well received in Europe. The record was also well received by music placement managers, gaining them a spot in MTV Jackass spin-off shows Viva La Bam and Homewrecker as well other television spots. They also were included in several video games around this time for the Xbox and the release of the Xbox 360. The Bridgeburner was mixed by Monster Magnet's Bobby Pantella who also filled a couple gaps in the bass area. The record also contained a blistering lead guitar solo guest appearance on the track "Peepshow" by Monster Magnet's Ed Mundell. Phil Durr of the Sub-Pop act Big Chief graced the record as well with several guest guitar tracks. The band continued playing local gigs, weekend Midwest trips, and small tours for the remainder of 2004. The year is also noted for the re-release of The Glasspack's first full-length American Exhaust on red 12" vinyl from a small label in Chicago (4 Walls Records) and The Glasspack's endorsement with Fender Music (representative Alex Perez). By this time, "Dirty" was playing guitar behind his back, between his legs, and even with his teeth. One account of a 2004 SXSW Day Party performance in the Detroit Metro Times claims that the frontman did a backflip while playing guitar from the ground to the stage at the Austin, TX gig. With acts such as this and his loyalty to his red American Telecaster, he was a suitable choice for Fender.

In 2005, "Dirty" and The Glasspack slowed down a bit. The band members pursued side projects and college. Both "Dirty" Dave and drummer Brett Holsclaw began working more intensely towards graphic design degrees and settling for occasional side-project gigs instead of the intense work The Glasspack had become by then. "Dirty" eventually finished schooling as Brett remained in school. It was during this time "Dirty" began to right the tracks that would later become The Glasspack's brilliant third Small Stone Records release, Dirty Women.

In 2006, Dirty rounded the band up again and the help of guests from such notable Kentucky acts as Coliseum (band) and The Hookers. They finished their fourth full-length record in downtown Louisville at a multimillion-dollar studio, Downtown Recording, completely analog with vintage equipment. In the Spring of 2007, The Glasspack's fourth full-length release, Dirty Women, was unleashed and the band headed to Austin, TX to officially play the South By Southwest Music Festival as part of the 2007 Small Stone Records SXSW Showcase. The record was well received and a fresh come-back after the somewhat questionable Bridgeburner record. The band did an extensive set of U.S. tours for the release of Dirty Women in 2007. They also received their first paid invite to Europe in the form of the 13th Annual 2008 Roadburn Magazine Festival, also sponsored by Terrorizer Magazine. In the Winter of 2007, the band was announced as the Sunday headliner of the festival for an exclusive first show in Europe. The show sold out in 1 week during pre-sales in December 2007.

Also in 2007, the band released a split 10" vinyl on a small Detroit label (Sleeping Village Records). The record was a split EP with one of "Dirty" Dave's side-projects, Muddy Nasty River. The Glasspack side was a public radio performance they had done on 91.9FM WFPK Public Radio Louisville for the release of Bridgeburner in 2004, featuring bassist Todd Cook (Slint, The For Carnation, Crain). Todd had taken on bass duties for some time after Marcus Moody was diagnosed with MS.

In 2008, the band focused on rehearsing a 1 hour set exclusively for the people of the Roadburn Festival. The festival was also recorded and placed into a Dutch public audio archive website for free listening. 2008 also saw the re-release of The Glasspack's Powderkeg record on vinyl from Sleeping Village Records. The Glasspack is still residing in Louisville, Kentucky and taking, yet again, another break.

In 2009, The Glasspack's music was featured in FX's television program Sons of Anarchy. Also that year, a reissue of The Glasspack's first full-length American Exhaust was remastered by Jack Endino for Los Angeles label Poison Tree Records (iTunes digital only). The release includes a special remastered bonus of the band's 1991 demo recordings, entitled "The Polaris Demos." The demos were previously released only on cassette with request from the band.

In 2010, The Glasspack played a ten-year anniversary show in Louisville, Kentucky at the Zanzabar supporting the release of an orange seven inch vinyl split (with Louisville band the Trophy Wives) on Louisville label Noise Pollution. Writer Michael Jones did a cover story on the band's history in support of the show and release in the LEO Weekly (Louisville Eccentric Observer). The release includes a free download card with a good portion of the Glasspack's 2008 performance at the Roadburn Festival in Tilburg. Peter Searcy of the influential Louisville act Squirrel Bait joined the band on the seven inch vinyl title track, "If You Don't Have Anything Nice to Say," and is credited as The Glasspack's current bass player.

In 2014, The Glasspack announced plans to record a fifth full-length album, "Moon Patrol," intended to be essentially one song roughly 45 minutes long. According to frontman "Dirty" Dave Johnson, the record is to be a space rock departure from the more predominant punk sound of the band's past. No release date has been declared and likely because Johnson is also attending law school and playing with The Decline Effect, a punk band featuring former Kinghorse (Caroline Records/Produced by Danzig) guitarist Mark Abromavage.

== Discography ==
=== Albums ===
- Road Warriors' E.P. CD (2000, Better Days Records)
- American Exhaust LPCD (2001, Riverock Records)
- Powderkeg LPCD (2002, Small Stone Records)
- Bridgeburner LPCD (2004, Small Stone Records)
- American Exhaust LP Vinyl Reissue (2004, 4 Walls Records)
- Dirty Women LPCD (2007, Small Stone Records)
- The Glasspack/Muddy Nasty River E.P. Vinyl (2007, Sleeping Village Records)
- Powderkeg LP Vinyl Reissue (2008, Sleeping Village Records)
- American Exhaust + Polaris Demos LP Digital Reissue (2009, Poison Tree Records)
- Split with Trophy Wives Split 7" Vinyl (2010, Noise Pollution Records)

=== Compilations ===
- "Underground Invasion: Volume 4" LP/CD (Beer City Records)
- "Dedication From The Sullen Waters Of The Ohio" LP/CD (Fusion Records)
- "Cheap Thrills: Volume I" LP/CD (Better Days Records)
- "Cheap Thrills: Volume II" LP/CD (Better Days Records)
- "Saturday March 24, 2001 Show Compilation" EP/CD (Noise Pollution)
- "The Motherlodge Lodge: A Tribute To The Rudyard Kipling, Volume I" LP/CD (Mother Lodge Records)
- "Sucking the 70's" LP/CD (Small Stone Records)
- "Sucking the 70's – Back in the Saddle Again" LP/CD (Small Stone Records)
- "Hammer Down: Volume I" LP/CD (Motor Brand Clothing Promo CD)
- "Head Cleaner: A Louisville Music Compilation Vol. 1 & 2" Double Cassette (Gubbey Records)

== Personnel ==
=== Current members ===
- "Dirty" Dave Johnson- vocals/guitar
- Nick Hall - guitar
- Peter Searcy - bass
- Tony Rymniak - drums

=== Guests and former members ===
- Brett Holsclaw - Evil Twin Theory, Crab Nebula, Ladybirds
- Marcus Moody - Orange Telephone
- Matt Tucker - Evergreen
- Ed Mundell - Monster Magnet, Atomic Bitchwax
- Bob Pantella - Monster Magnet, Riotgod, Raging Slab
- Scott Hamilton - Small Stone Records
- Phil Durr - Giant Brain, Big Chief
- Adam Neal - The Hookers
- Matt Jaha - Lords, Coliseum
- Todd Cook - Dead Child, Slint, The For Carnation
- Mark Abromavage - Arch, Kinghorse
- Jason Hayden - Vrktm, Crain, Sunspring
- Eric McManus - Lords
- Peter Searcy - Squirrel Bait, Big Wheel
