= Skag Heaven =

Studio album by Squirrel Bait
- Released: 1987
- Recorded: August 1986 at Sound on Sound, Crestwood
- Genre: Post-hardcore, alternative rock
- Length: 25:46
- Label: Homestead
- Producer: Squirrel Bait

Squirrel Bait chronology
Squirrel Bait (1985)	Skag Heaven (1987)

Professional ratings
Review scores
Source	Rating
AllMusic	4.5/5 stars

Skag Heaven is the only full-length studio album by the American punk rock band Squirrel Bait. It was released in 1987 through Homestead Records. Squirrel Bait disbanded after the album's release and the band's members went on to form Slint, Bastro and a number of other influential indie and post-rock bands.

== Background ==
After the release of their eponymous EP, guitarist David Grubbs and bassist Clark Johnson went off to college, providing an obstacle for the band to rehearse or work on new material together. When Grubbs and Johnson returned for the summer, Squirrel Bait went on tour, supporting Sonic Youth, the Descendents, and Volcano Suns in various cities around the U.S. The tour was also a road test for their new songs that would comprise a new album. After the group recorded, Grubbs and Johnson returned to school and prompted the end of the band before the album's release.

== Single ==
The band went into the studio with engineer Howie Gano in 1986 and recorded the songs "Kid Dynamite" and "Slake Train Coming". While listening to the mixes, guitarist David Grubbs invited Karl Meyer of local band Human Zoo to do some backtracked vocals based on a dream related by Julian Bevan from the Cincinnati hardcore band Sluggo: "Tiny people, tiny people. So small you can fit them in the palm of your hand. Prove that they're not real and win a hundred dollars." The lyrics can be heard, slowed down and played backwards, during the song's final instrumental section. At concerts, the band would speak the words (forwards) during the song. Grubbs re-recorded this backtracking for the LP version of the song.

The single's two songs were not originally intended for inclusion on Skag Heaven, but the band only had eight songs for the album and wanted to release something longer than their first EP.

== Additional songs ==
For Skag Heaven, Grubbs wrote most of the band's music and lyrics, the sole exception being "Too Close to the Fire", the sole Squirrel Bait song penned by vocalist Peter Searcy. The band also reworked a version of the song "Black Light Poster Child", which originally appeared on an earlier demo tape with Britt Walford on drums. The LP version contained different lyrics.

The mostly instrumental "Rose Island Road" takes its title from a winding country road that held sentimental value to the members of Squirrel Bait and their friends. The road would later serve as a backdrop for the car on the cover of the first album by Brian McMahan's post-Squirrel Bait group Slint. The album's final song is a version of Phil Ochs' "Tape to California". Guitarist David Grubbs would later cover Ochs with his own post-Squirrel Bait band, Bastro.

== Track listing ==
Side one
No.	Title	Length
1.	"Kid Dynamite"	3:10
2.	"Virgil's Return"	2:26
3.	"Black Light Poster Child"	1:55
4.	"Choose Yr Poison"	2:29
5.	"Short Straw Wins"	2:51

Side two
No.	Title	Length
1.	"Kick the Kat"	2:43
2.	"Too Close to the Fire"	1:55
3.	"Slake Train Coming"	2:32
4.	"Rose Island Road"	2:42
5.	"Tape from California"	2:59

All songs written by Squirrel Bait except for "Tape from California" by Phil Ochs.

== Personnel ==
Squirrel Bait

- David Grubbs – guitar
- Clark Johnson – bass guitar
- Brian McMahan – guitar
- Peter Searcy – vocals
- Ben Daughtrey – drums, front design

Additional musicians and production

- Guy Dove – photography
- Howie Gano – engineering
