= Squirrel Bait (EP) =

EP by Squirrel Bait
- Released: 1985
- Recorded: July 1984 to May 1985 at Sound on Sound, Crestwood, KY
- Genre: Punk rock, post-hardcore
- Length: 17:45
- Label: Homestead Records

Squirrel Bait chronology
Squirrel Bait (1985)	Skag Heaven (1987)

Professional ratings
Review scores
Source	Rating
Allmusic	4/5 stars

Squirrel Bait is the first EP by the American punk rock band Squirrel Bait, released in 1985 through Homestead Records.

The band had recorded its second demo in 1984 while its members were still in high school. Originally slated for release on the local label Upstart Records, Peter Searcy sang, David Grubbs played guitar, Clark Johnson was on bass guitar, and Britt Walford on drums. Over the next several months, Upstart Records folded, Ben Daughtry replaced Walford on drums, Brian McMahan joined on second guitar, and the band began touring to other Midwestern cities opening for prominent regional indie bands like Hüsker Dü, Big Black and Naked Raygun. Bob Mould wanted Squirrel Bait to sign to the Hüsker's imprint Reflex Records, but the band pursued and landed a deal with Homestead Records.

The group returned to the studio in April 1985 with engineer Howie Gano and recorded six songs. Two songs from the previous year's demo sessions were added to comprise Squirrel Bait's eponymous 8-song EP, originally released on Homestead with cover design by Steve Albini. The record and its follow-up, Skag Heaven, were reissued a decade later by Drag City.

The cover of Squirrel Bait was recreated by The Shins in the music video of their song "New Slang".

== Reception ==
John Leland at Spin said, "It doesn’t just assault you. It consumes you. It penetrates you. It runs all of its power and anger and violence right through your defenseless spinal cord. It raises your blood pressure and paints your room a revolting color. You won't be able to taste your food while listening to this record. Spin this disc and it won't be the music that’s loud — it'll be you."

== Track listing ==
Side one
No.	Title	Length
1.	"Hammering So Hard"	2:56
2.	"Thursday"	2:12
3.	"Sun God"	2:47
4.	"When I Fall"	2:12

Side two
No.	Title	Length
1.	"The Final Chapter"	2:15
2.	"Mixed Blessing"	2:04
3.	"Disguise"	1:18
4.	"Perfect"	1:59

== Personnel ==
Squirrel Bait

- David Grubbs – guitar
- Clark Johnson – bass guitar
- Brian McMahan – guitar
- Peter Searcy – vocals
- Ben Daughtry – drums
- Britt Walford – drums on "When I Fall" and "Disguise"

Additional musicians and production

- Steve Albini – front design
- Craig Brown – photography
- Howie Gano – engineering
