= Dead Child =

American heavy metal band

- Origin: Louisville, Kentucky, United States
- Genres: Heavy metal, stoner rock, hard rock, post-grunge
- Years active: 2006
- Labels: Quarterstick Records, Cold Sweat
- Members: David Pajo, Todd Cook, Michael McMahan

Dead Child is an American heavy metal band from Louisville, Kentucky. The band played its first show at Lisa's Oak Street Lounge on August 19, 2006, with Pusher, Lords, and Blade of the Ripper.

During the 2005 Slint reunion tour, Pajo, Cook and McMahan decided that they wanted to play a more aggressive style of music akin to early Metallica, Iron Maiden, Judas Priest, and other metal bands that they admired as young fans.

The band recorded an EP at Headbanging Kill Your Mama Music in Louisville. The EP was released on February 6, 2007, on the Cold Sweat label. They also performed their song "Never Bet the Devil Your Head" for the Burn to Shine DVD series. The band's debut album Attack was released on April 8, 2008, on Quarterstick Records and was produced by Brad Wood. Their music video for "Sweet Chariot" received significant airplay on Headbangers Ball on MTV2 in the summer of 2008, and was voted by viewers as the best new video of the week on the Headbangers Ball website the week it debuted. The video was shot in April 2008 in a warehouse in downtown Louisville, Kentucky, that the band sometimes used as a rehearsal space and was produced and directed by Douglas Dillingham.

== Members ==
Dead Child is notable for its members, all of whom have been in prominent indie rock and underground bands:

- David Pajo of Slint, Zwan, Tortoise, and numerous other projects
- Todd Cook of Shipping News, Crain, The Glasspack and the reunited Slint
- Michael McMahan of The For Carnation and the reunited Slint
- Tony Bailey of Crain and numerous other projects
- Dahm of Phantom Family Halo and Brothers of Conquest
