= Tweez =

1989 studio album by Slint

Studio album by Slint
- Released: July 1989
- Recorded: Autumn 1987
- Studio: Studiomedia (Evanston, Illinois)
- Genre: Math rock
- Length: 29:27
- Label: Jennifer Hartman
- Producer: Steve Albini

Slint chronology
Tweez (1989)	Spiderland (1991)

Tweez is the debut studio album by American rock band Slint and the only studio recording released before their disbandment. It was released on the label Jennifer Hartman Records in 1989 as the only record put out by the label, which was run by their friend, Jennifer Hartman. It is the only Slint album to feature bassist Ethan Buckler.

The album was reissued by Touch and Go Records in 1993 after the group's follow-up, Spiderland, began to generate a cult following.

== Background ==
Tweez was recorded at Studiomedia in Evanston, Illinois, and was engineered by Steve Albini.

All of the album's song titles are taken from the names of the band members' parents, with the exception of "Rhoda", which was named after drummer Britt Walford's dog: "Ron" and "Charlotte" are named for Walford's parents, "Nan Ding" and "Darlene" for guitarist David Pajo's, "Carol" and "Kent" for guitarist and vocalist Brian McMahan's and "Warren" and "Pat" for those of bassist Ethan Buckler.

On the vinyl version of the album, the individual sides of the record are labelled and given in the track listing as "Bemis" and "Gerber".

== Artwork ==
The cover art for Tweez features a photo of a Saab 900 S, with the Saab logo on the grille replaced with "Slint" and the album’s title, “Tweez” on the grille. On the vinyl version of the album, both labels feature parodies of the Saab logo, with "Slint" replacing "Saab" and the name of either side of the album (Bemis and Gerber) replacing "Scania." Additionally, a figure can vaguely be seen sitting in the drivers side of the vehicle, through the windshield. This was years later revealed in the 2014 documentary Breadcrumb Trail to be fellow Louisville musician and friend of the band Will Oldham, wearing a crash helmet. On CD and cassette versions of the album, the message "This recording is meant to be listened to on vinyl." can be seen on the back.

The Saab still belongs to its original owner, Jeffrey B. Richardson, MD. In the late 1980’s, Dr. Richardson encountered drummer Britt Walford’s father, Ron, at a Bardstown Road car wash in Louisville who pitched the idea of using Richardson’s Saab for the album. The "royalty" paid to Richardson for the use of the Saab was a bottle of Maker’s Mark bourbon.

== Reception ==
Professional ratings
Review scores
Source	Rating
AllMusic	3/5 stars
NME	7/10
The Rolling Stone Album Guide	2.5/5 stars
Select	4/5
Spin Alternative Record Guide	4/10

The album has received generally mixed to positive reviews.

John Bush of AllMusic described the album as "a fine, if bizarre recording, often switching from bass-led rhythm to rhythm in the same song."

== Track listing ==
The vinyl sides are referred to as "Bemis" and "Gerber".

No.	Title	Length
1.	"Ron"	1:55
2.	"Nan Ding"	1:47
3.	"Carol"	3:40
4.	"Kent"	5:48
5.	"Charlotte"	4:29
6.	"Darlene"	3:05
7.	"Warren"	2:32
8.	"Pat"	3:35
9.	"Rhoda"	2:36
Total length:		29:27

== Tweez (tweethan mix) ==
Tweez (tweethan mix)

Remix album by Slint
- Released: October 25, 2024
- Length: 28:43
- Label: Touch and Go
- Producer: Steve Albini; Ethan Buckler; Anne Gauthier

Slint chronology
Slint (1994)	Tweez (tweethan mix) (2024)

In 2023, former Slint bassist Ethan Buckler and mixing engineer Anne Gauthier remixed Tweez. The resulting remix album, Tweez (tweethan mix), contains a slightly different tracklist than the original, with retitled songs. The remix album was released on October 25, 2024.

No.	Title	Length
1.	"Intro"	0:15
2.	"The Book"	1:53
3.	"Paint the Houses"	3:44
4.	"Ballet School"	1:55
5.	"Christmas Tree"	5:24
6.	"Tokens of Affection"	3:03
7.	"New Dave"	3:30
8.	"Rhoda"	2:40
9.	"Hippie Chick"	2:04
10.	"Hollow Eyes"	4:15
Total length:		28:43

== Personnel ==
Slint

- David Pajo – guitar
- Brian McMahan – guitar, vocals
- Britt Walford – drums, vocals
- Ethan Buckler – bass guitar

Guest Musicians

- Edgar Blossom – vocals on "Warren"

Technical

- Steve Albini (credited as "some fuckin' derd niffer") – engineering
- Joe Oldham – cover photography
- Lisa Owen – cover design
