= J. Graham Brown School =

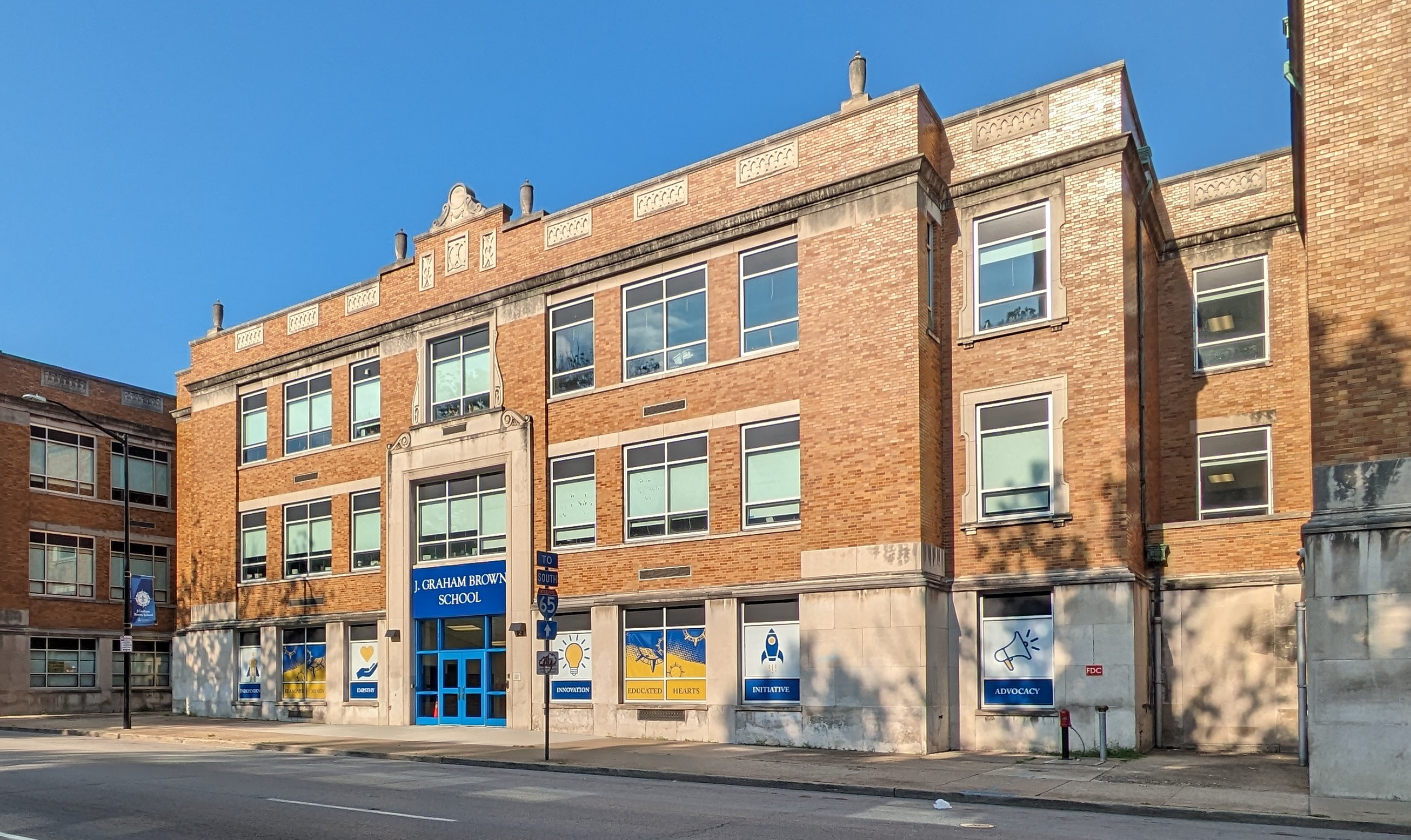

Location
- 546 S. First Street; Louisville, Kentucky 40202; United States; 38°15′1.02″N 85°45′10.37″W

Information
- Other name: The Brown School
- Type: Magnet school
- Established: 1971
- School district: Jefferson County Public Schools
- NCES School ID: 210299002027
- Principal: Angela Parsons
- Teaching staff: 46.00 (on an FTE basis)
- Grades: K–12
- Enrollment: 729 (2015-2016)
- Student to teacher ratio: 15.85
- Campus type: Urban
- Colors: Blue and Gold
- Website: www.jefferson.kyschools.us/o/brown

The J. Graham Brown School, usually called The Brown School, is a small magnet school located in downtown Louisville, Kentucky, United States. It has approximately 750 students in kindergarten through 12th grade, and attracts students from all over Louisville. It is a part of the Jefferson County Public Schools system. The school is noted for its liberal arts curriculum and emphasis on student independence.

== Recognitions ==
Newsweek listed Brown as one of the "Best Schools in America" in both 2009 and 2010, placing them in the top 4% of schools nationwide. Brown was honored by U.S. News & World Report with a Bronze Medal Award in 2007, 2008, and 2009. As of 2013, every year Brown School had placed in the top three or four schools across the Commonwealth of Kentucky in both the ACT and the Kentucky Core Content Test. Brown High School was the state's top scorer in the 2009 CATS testing cycle.

== History ==
The school was founded in 1971, with classes starting in the fall of 1972 in the Brown Hotel at Fourth Street and Broadway in downtown Louisville. Brown was the first "magnet school" in the JCPS district, and it enrolled students from all parts of Louisville as part of the Louisville School System. As the school grew the neighboring Brown Building was rehabilitated to accommodate it. The lower nine stories of the ten-story Brown Building were ultimately used by the school during its first ten years, before it moved to its present location on South First Street, south of Muhammad Ali Boulevard.

The founding director of J. Graham Brown School was Murray State University graduate Martha Ellison, who, during her earlier teaching career, was the English teacher of playwright Marsha Norman. Upon her retirement, Ellison was succeeded by her longtime assistant director, Douglas Proctor. The Martha A. Ellison Peace Green, across First Street from the school, is named in her honor. As of 2015 the principal of Brown School is Dr. Angela G. Parsons.

Although the school has always referred to itself as the J. Graham Brown School, this name did not become official until 2017. The "J. Graham Brown" name appears on the outside of the current building, and its letterhead and diplomas have always used this name, as have the school's alumni and parent–teacher associations. The name change became official at the March 21, 2017 meeting of the Jefferson County Board of Education.

== Notable alumni ==
- Mac King, magician
- Brian McMahan, musician (Slint)
- Will Oldham, musician
- Peter Searcy, musician
- Britt Walford, musician (Slint)
- Wendy Whelan, ballet dancer (attended)
- Bradford Young, cinematographer

== See also ==
- Public schools in Louisville, Kentucky
