= Funny Farm =

Funny farm may refer to:

- Funny farm, a pejorative slang term or euphemism for a psychiatric hospital
- The Funny Farm (film), a 1982 film starring Peter Aykroyd
- Funny Farm (film), a 1988 film starring Chevy Chase
- Funny Farm (TV series), a Canadian musical comedy television series from 1974 to 1975
- Funny Farm (Milwaukee TV show) a Milwaukee children's show
- Funny Farm (play), a 1975 television play by Roy Minton
- Funny Farm, an album by King Kong
- Funny Farm, an album by Pip Skid
- Funny Farm (novel), a novel by Jay Cronley
- Funny Farm (webcomic), a webcomic
