= Watter (band) =

American musical group

- Origin: Louisville, Kentucky
- Genres: Experimental music, post-rock
- Years active: 2013–present
- Label: Temporary Residence Limited
- Members: Zak Riles; Tyler Trotter
- Past members: Britt Walford

Watter is an American experimental music ensemble from Louisville, Kentucky.

Watter member Zak Riles is a member of Grails, and Britt Walford formerly drummed in the band Slint. Their debut, This World, features appearances from Rachel Grimes of Rachel's, Todd Cook of The For Carnation and The Shipping News, and Tony Levin of King Crimson.

== Members ==
- Zak Riles – guitar, keyboards
- Tyler Trotter – keyboards
- Britt Walford – percussion

== Discography ==
- This World (Temporary Residence, 2014)
- History of the Future (Temporary Residence, 2017)
