= The For Carnation (album) =

Studio album by The For Carnation
- Released: April 4, 2000
- Recorded: July 1998 – July 1999
- Studio: Various: Electrical Audio; (Chicago, IL); King Sound; (Los Angeles, CA); Magnetic Sound; (North Hollywood, CA); The Monastery; (Los Angeles, CA); Soma Electronic Music Studio; (Chicago, IL); Sonora Recorders; (Los Angeles, CA)
- Genre: Slowcore, post-rock
- Length: 43:43
- Label: Domino/Touch and Go

The For Carnation chronology
Promised Works (1997)	The For Carnation (2000)

Professional ratings
Review scores
Source	Rating
AllMusic	4/5 stars
Alternative Press	4/5
NME	9/10
Pitchfork	8.0/10
Q	3/5 stars
Select	4/5

The For Carnation is the eponymously titled album by The For Carnation, released on April 4, 2000, through Domino and Touch and Go Records.

== Track listing ==
All tracks are written by The For Carnation.

No.	Title	Length
1.	"Emp. Man's Blues"	8:12
2.	"A Tribute To"	6:08
3.	"Being Held"	5:35
4.	"Snoother"	6:27
5.	"Tales (Live from the Crypt)"	7:53
6.	"Moonbeams"	9:28

== Personnel ==
Adapted from the Promised Works liner notes.

The For Carnation

- Bobb Bruno – guitar, keyboards, sampler
- Todd Cook – bass guitar
- Steve Goodfriend – drums
- Brian McMahan – vocals, guitar, keyboards, design
- Michael McMahan – guitar

Additional musicians

- Alison Chesley – cello (1, 6)
- Kim Deal – vocals (5)
- Dan Fliegel – congas (2)
- Christian Frederickson – viola (1, 6)
- Rachel Haden – vocals (4)
- Noel Kupersmith – acoustic bass guitar (1, 6)
- Rafe Mandel – keyboards (1, 2)
- Britt Walford – drums (3)

Production and additional personnel

- David Babbitt – design
- Heather Cantrell – photography
- Rod Cervera – recording
- Tom Grimley – recording
- John McEntire – mixing, recording
- Roger Seibel – mastering

== Release history ==
Region	Date	Label	Format	Catalog
United States	2000	Touch and Go	CD, LP	tg214
United Kingdom	2000	Domino	CD, LP	wig77
