= Sing the Troubled Beast/Diablo Guapo =

Compilation album by Bastro
- Released: 22 February 2005
- Recorded: 14 July 1989 (tracks 11–18, 20); 1989 (tracks 19, 21); 14 July 1990 (tracks 1–7, 9); 1990 (tracks 8, 10)
- Studio: Smart Studios (tracks 1–7, 9); BMS I, Oberlin (track 8); First Congregational Church, Madison (track 10); Chicago Recording Company (tracks 11–18, 20); Sound On Sound Studios, New York City (track 19); "a basement", Louisville (track 21)
- Genre: Post-hardcore; noise rock; math rock
- Length: 56:06
- Label: Drag City
- Producer: Doug Colson (tracks 1–10); Brian Paulson (tracks 1–18, 20); Howie Gano (track 19)

Professional ratings
Review scores
Source	Rating
Allmusic	4.5/5 stars
Drowned in Sound	9/10
The New York Times	favorable
Orlando Weekly	favorable
Ox-Fanzine	9/10
Tiny Mix Tapes	4/5 stars

Sing the Troubled Beast/Diablo Guapo is a 2005 compilation of the two sole full-length studio albums originally released by Louisville post-hardcore band Bastro - Diablo Guapo (1989) and Sing the Troubled Beast (1990). Released via Drag City, the compilation includes all of the tracks from both of these albums in their original order, except one ("Pretty Smart On My Part" off of Diablo Guapo, a Phil Ochs cover).

== Track listing ==
Originally released on LP by Homestead Records while the band was still together, Drag City's retrospective is sequenced in reverse chronological order, with the 10 tracks from 1990's Sing the Troubled Beast preceding those from 1989's Diablo Guapo LP.

1. "Demons Begone" - 2:42
2. "Krakow, Illinois" - 2:41
3. "I Come From a Long Line of Shipbuilders" - 3:42
4. "Tobacco in the Sink" - 2:59
5. "Recidivist" - 2:31
6. "Floating Home" - 4:12
7. "Jefferson-In-Drag" - 2:54
8. "The Sifter" - 2:24
9. "Noise/Star" - 3:27
10. "Recidivist" - 2:39
11. "Tallow Waters" - 1:49
12. "Filthy Five, Filthy Ten" - 2:49
13. "Guapo" - 1:59
14. "Flesh-Colored House" - 1:55
15. "Short-Haired Robot" - 2:55
16. "Can of Whoopass" - 2:49
17. "Decent Skin" - 3:19
18. "Engaging the Reverend" - 1:57
19. "Wurlitzer" - 1:49
20. "Hossier Logic" - 2:18
21. "Shoot Me a Deer" - 2:16

Sources:

- Diablo Guapo (1989): tracks 11–21
- Sing the Troubled Beast (1990): tracks 1–10

== Personnel ==
Adapted from Allmusic:

- Clark Johnson - performer
- David Grubbs - performer
- John McEntire - performer
- Bastro - writer
- William Bennett - drill (track 14)
- Britt Walford - drums (track 21)
