= Ethan Buckler =

American musician/songwriter (born 1967)

- Born: 1967 (age 58–59); Louisville, Kentucky, U.S.
- Genres: Math rock; post-hardcore
- Occupation: Musician
- Instruments: Guitar; bass; keyboards; vocals
- Years active: 1986–present
- Label: Drag City
- Member of: King Kong
- Formerly of: Slint

Ethan Buckler (1967) is an American musician and songwriter best known as a founding member of the bands King Kong and Slint. He is currently living in Louisville, Kentucky.

== Life and career ==
=== 1986–1987: Slint ===
In 1986, Buckler formed Slint with David Pajo and former Squirrel Bait members Brian McMahan and Britt Walford. He performed on Slint's 1987 debut album Tweez, which was produced by Steve Albini. Buckler was severely disappointed by Albini's production style, saying "he would produce bands to sound raw and abrasive; I wanted Slint to sound warm and delicate." Frustrated with the end product and at odds with the direction the band was heading, Buckler departed soon after recording had wrapped. Tweez would go unreleased until 1989, by that time Buckler had formed his own musical project called King Kong, which was more influenced by psychedelic rock and blues rock.
