= Interlay =

Interlay is an American post-punk band from Madison, Wisconsin.

== History ==
The band originally went by the name Wash. They released their first EP, Ritual under that moniker. The band released their first EP as Interlay in 2020 titled Cicada. In 2022, the band released a song titled Androgynous.

== Band members ==
Current

- Alexandria Ortgiesen (vocals, guitar)
- Nate Dixon (bass)
- Brent Favata (drums)

Former

- Amelia Livingston (guitar)
- Sam Eklund (guitar)
- Henry Ptacek (drums)
- Kayla Chung (bass)
- Indigo Smith-Oles (guitar)
- Nathan Hahn (bass)
- Alex Kaiser (drums)
- Vincent Dunn (bass)

== Influences ==
The band cites Slint, Hole (band), Weed, Joy Division, Sonic Youth, and The Cure as influences.
