= Marshmallows (album) =

Studio album by The For Carnation
- Released: March 12, 1996
- Recorded: June–October 1995
- Genre: Slowcore, post-rock
- Length: 30:54
- Label: Matador

The For Carnation chronology
| Fight Songs (1995) | Marshmallows (1996) | Promised Works (1997) |

Professional ratings
Review scores
| Source | Rating |
|---|---|
| Allmusic | 3/5 stars |

Marshmallows is the debut mini-LP of The For Carnation, released on March 12, 1996 by Matador Records.

== Track listing ==
All tracks are written by The For Carnation.

| No. | Title | Length |
|---|---|---|
| 1. | "On the Swing" | 2:06 |
| 2. | "I Wear the Gold" | 5:27 |
| 3. | "Lmyr, Marshmallow" | 2:08 |
| 4. | "Winter Lair" | 5:38 |
| 5. | "Salo" | 6:45 |
| 6. | "Preparing to Receive You" | 8:50 |

== Personnel ==
Adapted from the Marshmallows liner notes.

The For Carnation

- John Herndon – drums
- Doug McCombs – bass guitar
- Brian McMahan – vocals, guitar
- Michael McMahan – guitar
- John Weiss – drums

Production and additional personnel

- Grant Barger – engineering
- Greg Calbi – mastering
- Gordon Jenkins and his Orchestra – arrangement, strings
- Elizabeth Kelly – painting
- Andy Vandette – mastering
- Brad Wood – engineering

== Release history ==
| Region | Date | Label | Format | Catalog |
|---|---|---|---|---|
| United States | 1996 | Matador | CD, LP | olé 172 |
