= Promised Works =

Compilation album by The For Carnation
- Released: 1997
- Recorded: July 1994 – October 1995
- Genre: Slowcore, post-rock
- Length: 46:11
- Label: Runt

The For Carnation chronology
Marshmallows (1996)	Promised Works (1997)	The For Carnation (2000)

Professional ratings
Review scores
Source	Rating
Allmusic	4/5 stars
NME	7/10 stars
Pitchfork Media	(7.4/10)

Promised Works is a compilation album by The For Carnation, released in 1997 by Runt Records.

== Track listing ==
All tracks are written by The For Carnation.

Fight Songs EP
No.	Title	Length
1.	"Grace Beneath the Pines"	7:43
2.	"How I Beat the Devil"	1:36
3.	"Get and Stay Get March"	5:57

Marshmallows mini-album
No.	Title	Length
4.	"On the Swing"	2:06
5.	"I Wear the Gold"	5:27
6.	"Lmyr, Marshmallow"	2:08
7.	"Winter Lair"	5:38
8.	"Salo"	6:45
9.	"Preparing to Receive You"	8:51

== Personnel ==
Adapted from the Promised Works liner notes.

The For Carnation

- John Herndon – drums
- Doug McCombs – bass guitar
- Brian McMahan – vocals, guitar
- Michael McMahan – guitar (4–9)
- David Pajo – guitar (1–3)
- John Weiss – drums (4–9)

Production and additional personnel

- Grant Barger – engineering
- Andrew Bonacci – arrangement (1–3)
- John Golden – remastering
- Gordon Jenkins and his Orchestra – arrangement, strings (4–9)
- London Symphony Orchestra – strings (1–3)
- Brad Wood – engineering (1–3)

== Release history ==
Region	Date	Label	Format	Catalog
United States	1997	Runt	CD	runt30
United States	2007	Touch and Go	CD	TG289
