= Tewligans =

Defunct live music venue in Louisville, Kentucky, USA

- Interactive map of Tewligans
- Location: Louisville, Kentucky, United States
- Coordinates: 38.2394854°N 85.7245592°W

Construction
- Opened: 1981
- Closed: 1996

Tewligans was a famous live music venue in Louisville, Kentucky. The venue operated between 1981 and 1996 at 1047 Bardstown Road in the Highlands neighborhood. Tewligans changed ownership a number of times, being known for a short time by the name "Snagilwet," which is "Tewligans" spelled backwards.

Tewligans provided a local stage for local, regional and national acts including Kinghorse, Green Day, Red Hot Chili Peppers, Smashing Pumpkins, Yo La Tengo, Slint, Widespread Panic, Squirrel Bait, Love Jones, NRBQ, Jonathan Richman, R.E.M., Crunchy Cereal, Steve Forbert, Gwar, Kentucky Headhunters, A Flock of Seagulls, Bo Diddley, Guadalcanal Diary, Miracle Legion, U2, Uncle Tupelo, Fugazi, Rollins Band, T.S.O.L., Blue Rodeo, Royal Crescent Mob, Afghan Whigs, Mojo Nixon, Hasil Adkins, Stick People, Bodeco, Endpoint, and many others.

The original plywood stage was demolished ca. 1991 and a new stage constructed using unfinished oak pallet lumber purchased from Hillerich & Bradsby.

Tewligans often hosted (illegal) afterhours parties for regular patrons who would drink free until whatever keg was in service had run dry. On other nights, patrons could walk the short distance to the infamous Hepburn House, wherein an afterhours speakeasy, The Cafe Ralph, operated.

Probably two of Tewligans' best known figures were the co-owners and creators of Tewligans, Doyle and Mary Guhy. They bought the venue in 1981, when it was still known as "The Funktion Junktion", a bar known for live Southern-rock music. Mary was known for her tough attitude, and was considered the bouncer of the venue.

The space reopened as "The Cherokee," which also operated as a live music venue. As of 2006, the location is operated as "Cahoots" and frequently features the same kinds of hardcore, punk rock and indie rock bands that used to grace the stage of Tewligans.

According to The Courier-Journal, '"Tewligans was a lifestyle."
