= Fight Songs (EP) =

EP by The For Carnation
- Released: April 6, 1995
- Recorded: July 1994 – January 1995
- Genre: Slowcore, post-rock
- Length: 15:17
- Label: Matador

The For Carnation chronology
Fight Songs (1995)	Marshmallows (1996)

Professional ratings
Review scores
Source	Rating
Allmusic	3/5 stars

Fight Songs is an EP by The For Carnation, released on April 6, 1995 by Matador Records.

== Track listing ==
All tracks are written by Grant Barger, John Herndon, Doug McCombs, Brian McMahan and David Pajo.

No.	Title	Length
1.	"Grace Beneath the Pines"	7:46
2.	"How I Beat the Devil"	1:36
3.	"Get and Stay Get March"	5:55

== Personnel ==
Adapted from the Fight Songs liner notes.

The For Carnation

- John Herndon – drums
- Doug McCombs – bass guitar
- Brian McMahan – vocals, guitar, programming
- David Pajo – guitar

Production and additional personnel

- Grant Barger – engineering
- Andrew Bonacci – arrangement
- Greg Calbi – mastering
- Elizabeth Kelly – painting
- London Symphony Orchestra – strings

== Release history ==
Region	Date	Label	Format	Catalog
United States	1995	Matador	CD	olé 131
