= History of the Future (album) =

Studio album by Watter
- Released: August 30, 2017
- Studio: Clovene; Earthwave Studios, Shelbyville, Kentucky, US
- Genre: Experimental rock; post-rock
- Length: 46:29
- Label: Temporary Residence Limited

Watter chronology
This World (2014)	History of the Future (2017)

History of the Future is the second studio album by American experimental rock band Watter, released via Temporary Residence in 2017. The release has received positive reviews from critics.

== Reception ==
At musicOMH, Sam Shepherd rated this album 3.5 out of 5 stars, stating that this album "sees the band opening their sound out considerably" since their debut This World and summed up that while it "is patchy in places... it most definitely succeeds". In Record Collector, Alun Hamnett rated History of the Future 4 out of 5 stars, stating that Watter shows "new directions" in their sound on this release and recommended that readers "submerge yourself fully and allow to infuse for 47 minutes". At Stereogum, Chris DeVille called the title track "an alternately ominous and exhilarating jazz-infused slow creep that will make you want to hear more".

== Track listing ==
1. "Telos" – 4:17
2. "Shadow Chase" – 2:27
3. "Death Knock" – 4:15
4. "Sacrificial Leaf" – 4:11
5. "Depth Charge" – 7:02
6. "Liquid of Life" – 3:01
7. "The Cloud Sanctuary" – 2:17
8. "Macho Milano" – 6:27
9. "History of the Future" – 7:26
10. "Final Sunrise" – 5:06

== Personnel ==
Watter

- Zak Riles – acoustic guitar; electric guitar; oud; synthesizer; Mellotron; harmonium; drum machine; drums on "Telos", "Death Knock", "Depth Charge", and "Liquid of Life"; bass guitar on "Death Knock"; sequencing; mixing
- Tyler Trotter – keyboards, synthesizer, lap steel guitar, bass guitar on "Depth Charge"
- Britt Walford – drums

Additional personnel

- Bundy K. Brown – bass guitar
- Dahm Majuri Cipolla – drums
- Todd Cook – bass guitar
- Jeremy deVine – mixing
- Jacob Duncan – tenor saxophone
- Rachel Grimes – piano
- Eric Adrian Lee – layout, design
- Nathan Salsburg – electric guitar
- Shawn Trail – marimba
- Bob Weston – audio mastering

== See also ==
- 2017 in American music
- List of 2017 albums
