= Untitled Slint EP =

Untitled

EP by Slint
- Released: August 29, 1994
- Recorded: Early 1989
- Studio: Chicago Recording Company (Chicago, Illinois)
- Genre: Post-rock; math rock; instrumental rock
- Length: 13:04
- Label: Touch and Go
- Producer: Steve Albini (uncredited)

Slint chronology
Spiderland (1991)	Untitled (1994)	Tweez (tweethan mix) (2024)

The untitled EP, also known as Untitled or Slint, is the only EP and final release by the American rock band Slint. It was recorded in early 1989, with the band breaking up in 1990 before Spiderland's release; it remained unreleased until 1994.

== Background ==
The songs featured on the EP were recorded in the spring of 1989 with Steve Albini, who engineered Slint's first studio album. The album contains a previously unreleased song, "Glenn", and a reinterpretation of the song "Rhoda" from Tweez.

Both songs were intended to be released as a 12" single on Jennifer Hartman Records, the same label that released Tweez, as original copies of that LP included a flyer advertisement for the 12" as an insert; Slint signed to Touch and Go Records before it was sent to press, however, and the master tapes were shelved. In 1994, Touch and Go released the EP in 10" and CD formats.

== Reception ==
Professional ratings
Review scores
Source	Rating
AllMusic	(2001) (2012)
The Rolling Stone Album Guide	3/5 stars

Marc Gilman of AllMusic praised the EP, describing it as "Slint's most important release" and "a requisite listen for anyone interested in the post-rock era." He also wrote: "Without lyrics, the music takes a precedence that it perhaps lacks on other albums." In the 2004 Rolling Stone Album Guide, Mac Randall deemed the EP "the band's best work, astutely balancing invention, aggression, and discipline."

== Track listing ==
Side one
No.	Title	Length
1.	Untitled ("Glenn")	6:11

Side two
No.	Title	Length
1.	Untitled ("Rhoda")	6:53
