= This World (Watter album) =

Studio album by Watter
- Released: May 27, 2014
- Studio: Locust, Kentucky; Louisville, Kentucky
- Genre: Experimental rock
- Length: 46:47
- Language: English
- Label: Temporary Residence Limited

Watter chronology
This World (2014)	History of the Future (2017)

This World is the debut studio album by American experimental rock band Watter, released via Temporary Residence in 2014. The release has received positive reviews from critics.

== Reception ==
Editors at AllMusic rated this album 3.5 out of 5 stars, with critic Fred Thomas writing that this album displays how "the band sets out on a journey of sonic shifts, marked by hints of Louisville's rich history of independent instrumental music" resulting in "an exploratory path all their own, reflecting deeply in the form of both rowdy exclamations and hushed looks inward". Editors at Pitchfork scored this release 7.0 out of 10 and critic Nick Nyland characterized it as "a series of question marks and false trails, driven by music caught up in the divide between simple and complex gestures" that "takes introspection as a starting point and sees how many shades of black it can bash out of it". At The Skinny, Will Fitzpatrick gave This World 4 out of 5 stars, stating that listeners will get "simply lost to its bountiful charms".

== Track listing ==
All songs written by Zak Riles, Tyler Trotter, and Britt Walford

1. "Rustic Fog" – 7:02
2. "Lord I Want More" – 2:15
3. "Small Business" – 13:32
4. "Bloody Monday" – 4:22
5. "Seawater" – 12:51
6. "This World" – 6:44

Digital edition bonus track

7. "Digital Camo" – 6:21

== Personnel ==
Watter

- Zak Riles – acoustic guitar, electric guitar, keyboards, baglama, oud, sequencing, mixing, photography
- Tyler Trotter – lap steel guitar, melodica, keyboards, sound effects, drum machine
- Britt Walford – drums, membranophone on "Rustic Fog"

Additional personnel

- Todd Cook – bass guitar on "Seawater"
- Jeremy DeVine – mixing, layout
- Jessica Fey – photography
- Rachel Grimes – piano on "Lord I Want More" and "This World"
- Tony Levin – bass guitar on "Small Business"
- Cheyenne Mize – violin on "Bloody Monday"
- Carl Saff – audio mastering at Saff Mastering in Chicago, Illinois, United States
- Dane Waters – vocals on "Small Business" and "Bloody Monday"

== See also ==
- 2014 in American music
- List of 2014 albums
