= Funny Farm (album) =

Studio album by King Kong
- Released: 1993
- Genre: Indie rock
- Label: Drag City
- Producer: Brad Wood

King Kong chronology
Old Man on the Bridge (1991)	Funny Farm (1993)	Me Hungry (1995)

Funny Farm is an album by the American band King Kong, released in 1993. The band supported the album with a North American tour.

== Production ==
Funny Farm was produced by Brad Wood. It is a loose concept album about country living. It was frontman Ethan Buckler's intention to combat what he saw as the seriousness of indie rock by creating a fun and unpretentious sound. Britt Walford contributed on keyboards.

== Critical reception ==
Professional ratings
Review scores
Source	Rating
AllMusic	3/5 stars
Chicago Tribune	3.5/4 stars

The Washington Post wrote that "the Louisville quartet employs a bluesy groove on songs like 'Dirty City Rainy Day' and plunges into the Delta with the honking 'Bad Cat Blues', but its sauntering rhythms, zany lyrics and boy-girl vocals more often recall the B-52's than Muddy Waters." Trouser Press thought that, "with its herky-jerky rhythms and kitschy organ flourishes ... Funny Farm bears more than a passing resemblance to the B-52’s’ early days—an analogy furthered by the decidedly Cindy Wilsonized vocal harmonies Amy George drizzles over 'Island Paradise' and the frankly touching 'Dirty City, Rainy Day'." The Wisconsin State Journal labeled the album "oddly Jonathan Richman-esque pop."

Spin deemed Funny Farm "the compost-rock party record of the summer," writing that "the concept is Southern soul with all the archivism purged away, all the metaphorical presence reduced to a sneer, and all the sing-songy party hooks mixed loud." The Chicago Tribune praised the "sparse, casually goofball lyrics spread over chattering funk guitar, danceable bass lines and cheesy organ." The Albuquerque Journal called it "a loping and stilted funk, soul and blues amalgam with songs about running out of gas in Nevada, Kentucky tornados, scuba divers and flippant cartoon characters." The Chicago Reader determined that Funny Farm "brings to mind Dr. Seuss and Calvin Johnson collaborating on a musical version of Orwell's Animal Farm."

AllMusic wrote that "the arrangements are fun and playful, as organs and synths creep in among neatly crafted guitar lines and witty lyrics, making for an incredibly live texture—very fitting for a record with such a lack of seriousness."

== Track listing ==
No.	Title	Length
1.	"Funny Farm"
2.	"Dirty City Rainy Day"
3.	"Scooba Dooba Diver"
4.	"Uh-Oh"
5.	"Here I Am"
6.	"Bad Cat Blues"
7.	"Tornado Song"
8.	"King Kong"
9.	"White Horse"
10.	"Island Paradise"
