= Breadcrumb Trail (film) =

2014 film directed by Lance Bangs

- Directed by: Lance Bangs
- Produced by: Lance Bangs
- Starring: Slint; Steve Albini; Brian Paulson; Ian MacKaye; James Murphy; Corey Rusk; David Yow
- Edited by: Alex Morris
- Music by: Slint others
- Release date: March 10, 2014
- Running time: 93 minutes
- Country: United States
- Language: English

Breadcrumb Trail is a 2014 documentary film directed by Lance Bangs about the Louisville, Kentucky band Slint.

== Content ==
Breadcrumb Trail focuses on Slint's seminal album, Spiderland, and the Louisville music scene from which the band originated. Appearances are made by former members of Slint, their friends and family, Steve Albini, Brian Paulson, and other musicians. The film includes songs, demos, and live performances from Slint and other bands; most of these bands had contained one or more members from Slint's lineup.

== Release ==
Breadcrumb Trail had a limited theatrical release on March 10, 2014. On April 15, Touch and Go released a remastered Spiderland box set containing a DVD copy of the documentary; it was also included with the remastered vinyl edition of the album.

== Reception ==
Reception for Breadcrumb Trail has been positive. James S. Rich praised the film, calling it "an exciting examination of the more ephemeral aspects of artistic creation." Dan Nixon of The Quietus stated "while its subject matter isn’t going to appeal outside of some pretty narrow boundaries, that’s a shame, as the story is refreshing in the way it demystifies the process of creating music." In a review for Tiny Mix Tapes, Paul Bower called it "an extremely well put-together documentary" and "without a doubt the best film he’s ever made" (in reference to director Lance Bangs).
