= Bastro =

American post-hardcore band

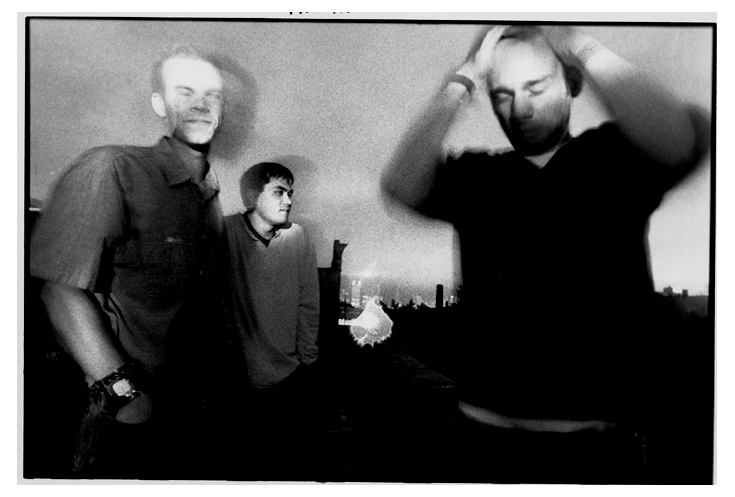

Background information
- Origin: Louisville, Kentucky, United States
- Genres: Post-hardcore, math rock
- Years active: 1988–1993
- Labels: Homestead Records
- Past members: David Grubbs; Clark Johnson; John McEntire; Bundy K. Brown

Bastro was an American post-hardcore band which was active in the late 1980s and early 1990s. The band's main line-up consisted of David Grubbs on guitar, Clark Johnson on bass guitar, and John McEntire on drums. The band also experimented with use of piano, organ and musique concrète compositions, foreshadowing McEntire's and Grubbs' subsequent musical projects.

== History ==
Bastro was formed by Louisville, Kentucky guitarist David Grubbs after his former band Squirrel Bait folded in 1987. Grubbs had moved to Washington, D.C. to attend Georgetown University where he started an early version of Bastro with bassist Dan Treado, who soon left. Grubbs' hometown friend Clark Johnson, who'd played bass in Squirrel Bait, joined Grubbs, and the duo recorded the six-song EP Rode Hard & Put Up Wet, backed by a drum machine and engineered by Steve Albini for Homestead Records in 1988.

After their first release, Bastro toured with the band My Dad Is Dead, whose drummer at the time was Oberlin College percussion major John McEntire. McEntire soon joined Bastro, replacing the drum machine, and the trio recorded a full-length album with former Squirrel Bait engineer Howie Gano. Two songs from this session were released as a single in 1989 and a test pressing of the album was made, but then scrapped when the band came back from their first European tour and decided they could do better. Returning to the studio with engineer Brian Paulson, they recorded faster versions of their songs and these—along with "Shoot Me a Deer" and "Wurlitzer" from the first session—comprised the band's first LP Diablo Guapo (Spanish for "Handsome Devil"). The album's 12 tracks clock in at 28 minutes, and include a cover of Phil Ochs' "Pretty Smart On My Part" as a follow-up to Squirrel Bait's own Ochs tribute on their album, Skag Heaven. In addition to presenting Bastro as a noise rock power trio playing in constantly shifting time signatures, Grubbs also plays piano on one track, mixed in with guitar feedback, tape music and spoken word, and the album's title track "Guapo" features a discordant horn section.

During this period Johnson was enrolled at Northwestern University in the Chicago suburb of Evanston, Illinois, and Grubbs also played in the band Bitch Magnet, resulting in a two year break before Bastro's second album, Sing the Troubled Beast. The band's instrumentation became more diverse, including more piano, organ, and an excursion into musique concrète on the song "The Sifter". Grubbs' lyrics also grew more obtuse. Johnson subsequently left the group to attend law school and was replaced on bass by Bundy K. Brown. Bastro toured and recorded a single with the group Codeine and began writing new, mostly instrumental material, some of which would later be released as a live album. Grubbs relocated to attend graduate school at the University of Chicago and the group known as Bastro evolved into Grubbs' next project, Gastr del Sol, with Brown and McEntire joining him for that project's debut album, The Serpentine Similar.

== Discography ==
=== Studio albums ===
- Rode Hard and Put Up Wet (LP, MiniAlbum, Homestead Records, 1988)
- Diablo Guapo (LP/CD, Homestead Records, 1989)
- Sing the Troubled Beast (LP/CD, Homestead Records, 1990)

=== Singles ===
- "Shoot Me A Deer"/"Goiter Blazes" (7" single, Homestead Records, 1989)
- "A L'Ombre De Nous (In Our Shadow)"/"Produkt" (7" and 12" with the band Codeine (1991, Sub Pop, Glitterhouse)

=== Live and compilation albums ===
- Antlers: Live 1991 (CD, Blue Chopsticks Records, 2005)
- Sing the Troubled Beast/Diablo Guapo (CD combining both LPs, minus one track, Drag City, 2005)
