= Brian Paulson =

American record producer

- Born: Minnesota, U.S.
- Occupation(s): Record producer, audio engineer

Brian Paulson is an American record producer and audio engineer from Minnesota, best known for recording albums by Slint, Uncle Tupelo, Son Volt, Superchunk and Wilco.

Paulson grew up in Bemidji, Minnesota, but moved about 200 miles south to Minneapolis after graduating from high school and started playing with Man Sized Action, which released two records, Claustrophobia and Five Story Garage on Bob Mould's Reflex Records label. He made many friends in the Chicago-Minneapolis musical pipeline, touring with reputable recording engineer Steve Albini. Through Albini, Paulson met David Grubbs and eventually worked with him on an album for his band, Bastro.

Paulson's career as a record producer didn't take off until he recorded Slint's final album, Spiderland. The album was recorded in Chicago in four days. Paulson and the band reportedly stayed up all night working to meet the deadline.

Since then, Paulson has worked on albums by Magnapop, Beck, Archers of Loaf, Dinosaur Jr., Polvo, US Maple, Squirrel Nut Zippers, Royal Trux, Superchunk, The Rosebuds, The Rock*A*Teens, Crooked Fingers, Mark Eitzel, Something For Kate, The Spinanes, Dollface, The Comas, Sorry About Dresden, Cracker, The Sea and Cake, The Wedding Present and many others representative of his diverse tastes in music.

He lives in Carrboro, North Carolina.
