= King Kong (band) =

Music project of Ethan Buckler

- Origin: Louisville, Kentucky, U.S.
- Genres: Indie rock, funk rock, garage rock, lo-fi
- Years active: 1988–1998, 2000–present
- Label: Drag City
- Members: Ethan Buckler; Willie MacLean; Eric Baldwin
- Past members: David Pajo; Britt Walford; Brian McMahan; Darren Rappa; Richard Schuler; Amy Partin Ritchie; Brett Holsclaw; David Grubbs; Todd Hildreth; Ray Rizzo; Peter Townsend; Suki Anderson; Andy Hurt; Brian Hubbard

King Kong is an American indie rock music project fronted by musician Ethan Buckler. Buckler left his previous band, Slint, in 1989. Previously in late 1988 he already started a new musical project. King Kong's first release, Movie Star, featured the other three members of Slint, David Pajo, Britt Walford, and Brian McMahan. King Kong would go on to feature an ever-changing lineup of performers including Richard Schuler, John McEntire, David Grubbs, and Peter Townsend.

The song "Movie Star" was used in the end credits of the 2014 Slint documentary, Breadcrumb Trail.

In 2018, King Kong released three singles: "60s Apartment Building Balcony", "Pawnshopolis", and "Pigeon Man". Each one was accompanied with a music video.

On March 8, 2021, Jimmy Fallon included Old Man On The Bridge in his "Do Not Play" segment on The Tonight Show.

== Members ==
=== Current lineup ===
- Ethan Buckler – vocals (1988–1998, 2000–present), bass (1988–1989, 1992–1995), guitar (1988–1998, 2000–present), keyboards (1992–1993, 2000–?), electronics (2014–2018)
- Willy MacLean – bass (1995–1998, 2000–present), backing vocals (2007)
- Eric Baldwin - drums (2013–present)

=== Former members ===
- David Pajo – drums (1988–1989, 1994–1995), guitar (1988–1989, 1994) (guest congas in 1991)
- Britt Walford – drums, backing vocals (1988–1989), keyboards (1992–1993)
- Brian McMahan – guitar, backing vocals (1988–1989)
- Darren Rappa – bass, backing vocals (1989–1992)
- Richard Schuler – drums (1989–1994), percussion, backing vocals (1992–1994)
- Amy Ritchie (formerly Amy Partin Ritchie, Amy Partin, Amy Greenwood, Amy George (maiden name)) – vocals, acking vocals (1992–1998, 2000–2024)
- Brett Holsclaw – bass (1993)
- David Grubbs – guitar (1993)
- Todd Hildreth – organ, keytar (1994–1998, ?–2025)
- Ray Rizzo – drums, backing vocals (1996–1998, 2000–?)
- Peter Townsend – drums, percussion, backing vocals (~2007–?)
- Suki Anderson – vocals (?–?)
- Andy Hurt – percussion (?–?)
- Brian Hubbard – bass (?–?)

== Discography ==
=== Studio albums ===
- Old Man on The Bridge (1991, Homestead Records)
- Funny Farm (1993, Drag City)
- Me Hungry (1995, Drag City)
- Kingdom of Kong (1997, Drag City)
- The Big Bang (2002, Drag City)
- Buncha Beans (2007, Drag City)

=== Compilations ===
- Breeding Ground (2001, Sea Note)

=== Singles & EPs ===
- Movie Star EP (1989, Self-released)
- "Bring It On" (1990, Trash Flow Records)
- "Hot Dog Days" (1994, Drag City)
- "60s Apartment Building Balcony" (2018, Drag City)
- "Pawnshopolis" (2018, Drag City)
- "Pigeon Man" (2018, Drag City)
