= Squirrel Bait =

American punk rock band

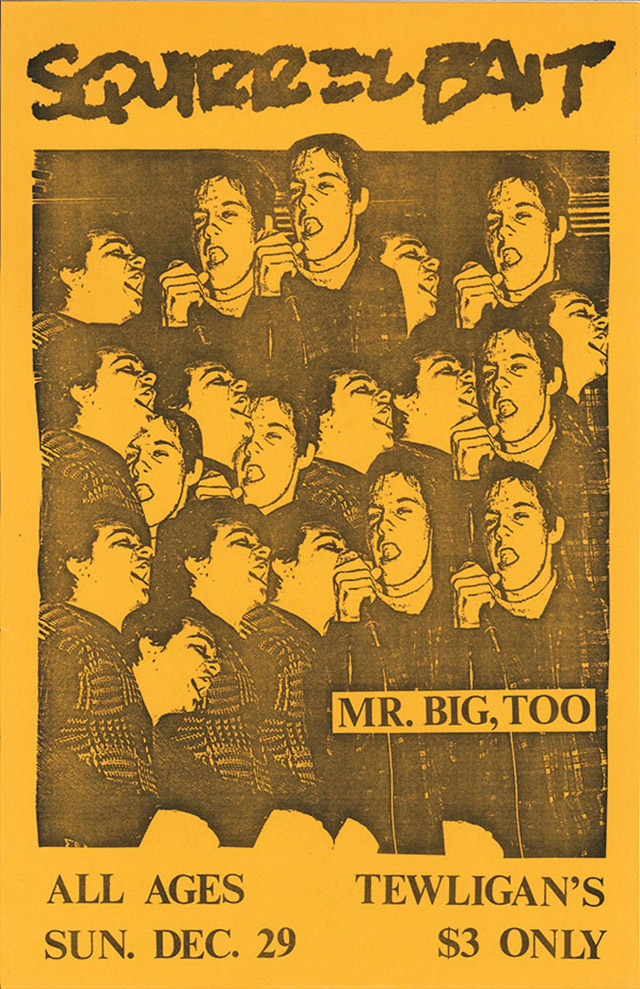
- Concert flier for a Squirrel Bait show at Tewligans

Background information
- Also known as: Squirrelbait Youth (1982–1983); Bork! (1987); Motorola Cloudburst (1987)
- Origin: Louisville, Kentucky, U.S.
- Genres: Post-hardcore; punk rock; indie rock; emocore
- Years active: 1982–1988
- Label: Homestead
- Spinoffs: Bastro, Slint, Fancy Pants, Bead
- Past members: David Grubbs; Clark Johnson; Rich Schuler; Steve Driesler; Peter Searcy; Britt Walford; Brian McMahan; Ben Daughtrey

Squirrel Bait was an American punk rock band from Louisville, Kentucky active from 1982 to 1988. Squirrel Bait's dense, moody, melodic hardcore sound, featuring pronounced tempo shifts, foreshadowed the grunge sound of the late 1980s as well as math rock. Squirrel Bait, along with Hüsker Dü, are often noted as precursors to the emocore ("emotional hardcore") sound that arose from the D.C. hardcore punk scene with bands like Rites of Spring, Beefeater and Fugazi.

Squirrel Bait signaled the second coming of American punk – bands of little brothers and sisters who got to grow up on Black Flag and Hüsker Dü without a preparatory course in Supertramp. ... Like a hundred other little Düs across the country, Squirrel Bait managed to make a couple of records before spintering off to form five more bands. Unlike most of that punk rock loam, the members of Squirrel Bait chewed up their legacy and shat out something curious and consequential.

== History ==
=== Origins: 1982–1987 ===
The band started as a hardcore punk trio of high school friends, originally known as Squirrelbait Youth, with David Grubbs on guitar and vocals, Clark Johnson on bass guitar, and Rich Schuler playing drums on Halloween 1982. The band's first demo tape as Squirrelbait Youth was released in 1982. Their first demo under Squirrel Bait name was recorded in August 1983. By the time Squirrel Bait recorded their next demo in 1984, Peter Searcy had taken over vocal duties and Britt Walford was playing drums. Three of this demo's songs would later appear on the band's vinyl releases.

Walford left and was replaced by Ben Daughtrey on drums and Brian McMahan joined on second guitar. The band continued to play locally and toured to nearby cities where they opened for Hüsker Dü and Chicago-based bands Naked Raygun and Big Black, who recommended Squirrel Bait to their label, Homestead Records. Through Homestead, Squirrel Bait released an eponymous EP in 1985, a single in 1986 and an LP in 1987, all of which were later compiled onto a single CD.

=== Breakup: 1988 ===
In the midst of the young band's success, Grubbs and Johnson had moved away to college, and artistic tensions were causing a "jocks-vs.-nerds" split in the band. These differences ultimately resulted in the band's break-up in 1988.

=== Post–breakup careers ===
Grubbs was subsequently a member of Bitch Magnet, Bastro, Gastr del Sol and The Red Krayola and has released a number of solo projects. Daughtrey played with The Lemonheads and then with Love Jones. McMahan reunited with original Squirrel Bait drummer Britt Walford to form Slint, and Both also appeared on the first single by King Kong. McMahan also formed The For Carnation and played with Palace Music. Walford would later play in Evergreen and The Breeders (as Shannon Doughton). Johnson played in Bastro with Grubbs but then chose not to make a career in music, opting instead for a career as an attorney in Louisville. Searcy played with Big Wheel and Starbilly before embarking on a solo career.

In 1997, Grubbs reissued Squirrel Bait's vinyl releases on Dexter's Cigar, an imprint of the Drag City label. The band's demo and live recordings have resurfaced on the internet.

== Musical style ==
Squirrel Bait's music has been characterized as "furious and melodic," drawing comparisons to Hüsker Dü and "the thrashier side of the Replacements." Steve Huey of AllMusic assessed: "Their sensibility was often compatible with the emerging Dischord stable, yet indebted to heavy metal as well, and their musical chops foreshadowed the intense prog-punk that would become one wing of the emo movement."

They have cited Hüsker Dü as an influence, with Grubbs stating the band were "the main propellant for our first record". Other influences included Minor Threat, Bad Brains, Black Flag, Naked Raygun, Buzzcocks, the Clash and the Replacements.

== Legacy ==
According to Steve Huey of AllMusic: "The seminal Squirrel Bait remain consistently underrated in terms of their influence on post-hardcore punk and alt-rock. A big part of that is due to their unfortunately scant recorded legacy: two albums, both under half an hour, both only sporadically available. Their visibility certainly wasn't helped by the lack of a bustling scene in their native Louisville, KY, at the time (though they helped kick start one), nor by the high-school-age members' youth, which made it difficult to tour and to make the transition to college."

== Members ==
=== Former members ===
- David Grubbs – guitar (1982–1988), vocals (1982–1984), backing vocals (1984–1988)
- Clark Johnson – bass (1982–1988)
- Rich Schuler – drums (1982–1983)
- Steve Driesler – vocals (1984)
- Peter Searcy – vocals (1984–1988)
- Britt Walford – drums (1983–1984, 1984)
- [unknown name] – drums (1984)
- Ben Daughtrey – drums (1984–1988)
- Brian McMahan – guitar (1984–1988)

== Discography ==
=== Studio albums ===
- Skag Heaven (1987) – Homestead Records

=== Demos ===
- Squirrelbait Youth (1982, self-released cassette) [under "Squirrelbait Youth" name]
- Squirrel Bait [aka First demo] (1983, self-released cassette)
- Squirrel Bait [aka Second demo] (1984, self-released cassette)

=== EPs ===
- Squirrel Bait (1985) – Homestead Records

=== Singles ===
- Kid Dynamite 7" (1986) – Homestead
- Motorola Cloudburst 7" (1987) – The Pope Fanzine
