= Crain (band) =

American indie band

Crain was an indie band from the late 80s and early 90s from Louisville, Kentucky. The band was similar to Slint and Rodan, as a part of the math rock and post-rock genres. They were formed after the demise of the Louisville band, Cerebellum.

Crain released two full-length albums and a handful of 7" records. Their first record, that Steve Albini produced, Speed was an early blueprint for releases that would follow in the post-rock and math rock movements. The lineup at that time included Jon Cook (bass, vocals), Joey Mudd (guitar, lead vocals), Tim Furnish (guitar, vocals on "King Octane") and Will Chatham (drums). The songs from Speed were written by Cook, Mudd and Furnish.

Several line-up changes occurred during the life of the band. Only founding members Jon Cook and Tim Furnish remained throughout. The band broke up while in the studio recording their third studio album in 1996.

Crain's Speed was remastered and reissued in 2005 by Temporary Residence Records along with some rare bonus tracks. It is speculated there have been plans to release the band's last recordings.

Many of the members of Crain reunited in 2010 under their original moniker, Cerebellum. One show was in May for Rodan's Jason Noble Benefit with Endpoint. The other was to celebrate the re-release of the 1989 Cerebellum EP with new recordings. At both shows they performed King Octane, Ribcage, Proposed Production, and Monkeywrench from the Speed album along with most of the Cerebellum songs. On February 9, 2013, Jon Cook died.

== Discography ==
Studio albums

- 1992 - Speed
- 1994 - Heater

Extended plays and singles

- 1990 - Crain / Deathwatch (7'', EP)
- 1991 - Monkeywrench (7'', EP)
- 1992 - Crackhouse (7'', Single)
- 1993 - The Grifters / Crain (7'', Single - Split EP)
