= Peter Searcy =

American songwriter

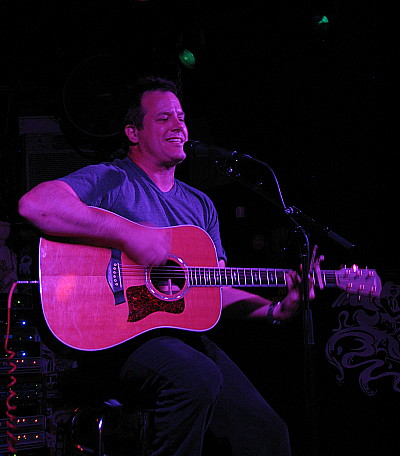
- Searcy performing in 2012

Background information
- Born: 1967 or 1968 (age 58–59)
- Origin: Louisville, Kentucky, U.S.
- Genres: Rock; punk rock
- Instruments: Vocals; guitar; cello
- Years active: 1984–present

Peter Searcy (born 1967 or 1968 (age 58–59)) is an American musician.

== Biography ==
Spin Magazine, Scott Irwin, and Amanda Green have compared Searcy's straightforward songwriting style and voice to those of Paul Westerberg. Like Paul Westerberg of the Replacements, Searcy is a veteran of the hardcore scene. Searcy was the frontman of the Louisville hardcore punk group Squirrel Bait in the 1980s. After Squirrel Bait disbanded, Searcy (along with Squirrel Bait drummer Ben Daughtrey) formed a funk-rock group called Fanci Pantz. Fanci Pantz garnered a lot of praise and major label attention, but they broke up before they could record an album. After the demise of Fanci Pantz, Searcy joined Big Wheel in 1989, which released three albums (two on Mammoth Records) before breaking up in 1993. His next band, Starbilly, released only one album, after which Searcy began performing solo. He released one album, produced by Tim Patalan entitled, "Could You Please and Thank You," on Time Bomb Recordings in 2000. Its style has been compared to that of Counting Crows and The Wallflowers. The album was followed by a self-released EP and a second full-length album on Initial Records in 2004, followed by Spark, now on Label X & Toucan Cove Entertainment.

Outside of music, Searcy is a licensed real estate agent.

== Discography ==
- Could You Please and Thank You (Time Bomb Recordings, 2000)
- Couch Songs (Initial Records, 2004)
- Trust Falls (Self-released, 2004)
- Spark (Toucan Cove/Universal, 2007)
- Fire Escape Promise EP (sonaBLAST! Records, 2011)
- Leave It All Out There (Eastwood Records, 2017)
