= The For Carnation =

American slowcore/post-rock band

- Origin: Louisville, Kentucky, U.S.
- Genres: Slowcore; post-rock
- Years active: 1994–present
- Labels: Touch and Go; Matador
- Members: Brian McMahan

The For Carnation are an American post-rock band from Louisville, Kentucky, formed in 1994. The band was formed by Brian McMahan, who is the only constant group member. McMahan's previous band Slint hinted at the distinctive sound and sombre aesthetic he would create in The For Carnation.

== History ==
To date they have released two EPs and one self-titled album: Fight Songs (Matador Records, 1995), Marshmallows (Matador, 1996), and The For Carnation (Touch and Go Records, 2000). Fight Songs and Marshmallows were compiled into one record, Promised Works, and released by Runt in 1997. Promised Works was re-released by Touch and Go Records in 2007. The band has included Doug McCombs and Johnny "Machine" Herndon of Tortoise, Bobb Bruno of Best Coast, Todd Cook (Shipping News) as well as Britt Walford and David Pajo of Slint.

They returned in December 2009 to play a show at the "Ten Years of ATP" All Tomorrow's Parties music festival in England.

A track "Alfredo's Welcome" appeared on What's Up Matador, the 1997 compilation of bands on Matador Records.

Another track called "The Bike" was included as a free download on White Power is For Dummies compilation album in December 2016.

== Discography ==
Studio albums

- The For Carnation (2000, Touch and Go)

EPs

- Fight Songs (1995, Matador)
- Marshmallows (1996, Matador)

Compilation albums

- Promised Works (1997, Runt)
