= Slint =

American rock band

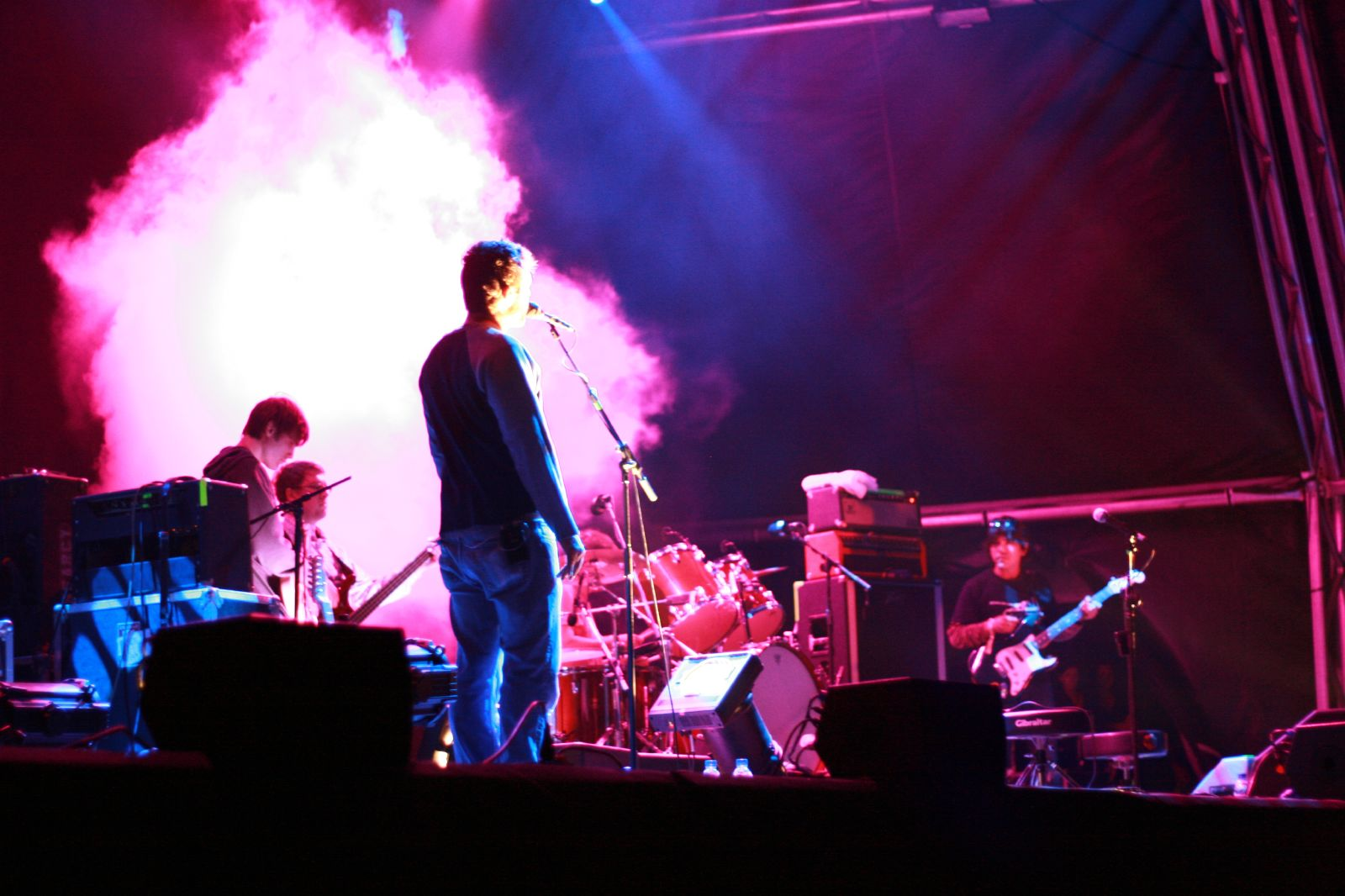
- Slint in 2007. Left to right: Michael McMahan, Matt Jencik, Brian McMahan, Britt Walford (obscured), and David Pajo.

Background information
- Also known as: Small Tight Dirty Tufts of Hair (1986)
- Origin: Louisville, Kentucky, U.S.
- Genres: Post-rock; math rock; post-hardcore; indie rock
- Works: Slint discography
- Years active: 1986–1991; 1992; 1994; 2005; 2007; 2013–2014
- Labels: Touch and Go; Jennifer Hartman Records
- Spinoffs: The For Carnation; King Kong
- Spinoff of: Squirrel Bait; Maurice
- Past members: Brian McMahan; David Pajo; Britt Walford; Ethan Buckler; Todd Brashear

Slint (/slɪnt/) was an American rock band from Louisville, Kentucky, formed in 1986 after the dissolution of two local bands, Squirrel Bait and Maurice. It initially consisted of Brian McMahan (guitars, vocals), David Pajo (guitar), Britt Walford (drums, vocals), and Ethan Buckler (bass). Though little known during their original run, they gained a cult following and acclaim as one of the pioneers of post-rock and math rock.

Slint's debut album, Tweez, was recorded by Steve Albini and released in 1989 on their record label, Jennifer Hartman Records and Tapes. Buckler left out of dissatisfaction with Tweez and was replaced by Todd Brashear. In 1991, Slint released their second album, Spiderland, on the independent label Touch and Go Records. They broke up prior to its release. Spiderland eventually became one of the most acclaimed indie rock albums of the 1990s.

After Slint broke up, Touch and Go records released an untitled EP recorded between their albums. After sporadic reunions, Slint disbanded again in 2014.

== History ==
=== Pre-Slint ===
Walford and McMahan met in their pre-teens and attended the Brown School, a Louisville public school founded on a pedagogy of self-directed learning. They began performing music together at an early age, forming the Languid and Flaccid with Ned Oldham (later of The Anomoanon) while still in middle school. In their teens Walford and McMahan played together in the seminal Louisville punk band Squirrel Bait. Walford left the band following their first recording session while McMahan went on to tour and record Squirrel Bait's two albums before the band's dissolution in 1987.

Pajo and Walford (and, briefly, McMahan) were in the punk/prog-metal band Maurice with future members of Kinghorse. After being influenced by the music of the Minutemen, Pajo and Walford's musical direction became too obtuse for the other members of Maurice, who parted ways. Maurice's later material would form the basis of some of Slint's early compositions.

=== 1986–1989: Founding, Recording of Tweez, and Ethan Buckler's departure ===
Slint formed in the summer of 1986. Walford and Pajo were joined by the slightly older Buckler (age 18 at the time) for a show for a Unitarian Universalist congregation on November 2; performing under the name Small Tight Dirty Tufts of Hair, most of the congregation left during the band's first two songs. They were soon joined by McMahan and named themselves Slint after one of Walford's pet fish.

Slint's first album, Tweez, was recorded in the fall of 1987 by Steve Albini, whom the band had chosen because they were fans of Albini's recently defunct group Big Black. Though Slint's members had composed the album's music during rehearsals in Walford's parents' basement, most of the lyrics were created in-studio, and included between-song sound effects and ad-libbed conversations with Albini. During mixdown, Walford requested that Albini "make the bass drum sound like a ham being slapped by a catcher's mitt," and then spilled a cup of tea on Albini's mixing board. Without formal song titles, eight of the album's tracks were named for the band members' parents, and a ninth for Walford's dog, Rhoda. Once completed, Buckler was dissatisfied with the recordings and left Slint to form the group King Kong, initially made up of all of Slint's members taking up different instruments. All of Slint's original members recorded the single "Movie Star" as King Kong in Steve Albini's studio while he was away on a trip in 1989.

=== 1988–1990: Todd Brashear joins, release of Tweez ===
Buckler was soon replaced by bass player Todd Brashear. Slint had hoped that Touch and Go Records would release Tweez, but the band did not hear back from the label. A friend of the group, Jennifer Hartman, paid for the album's release for a tiny run on the imprint Jennifer Hartman Records in 1989. By then the group had returned to the studio with Albini to record two instrumental tracks. Original copies of Tweez included a flyer advertising a 12" single of these songs to be released on Jennifer Hartman. But by now, the band had succeeded in catching the ear of Touch & Go Records's founder Corey Rusk who agreed to release the group's next album. The master tapes to the proposed 12" were then shelved, making Tweez the sole release on the Jennifer Hartman label.

By the time Tweez was released, most of the group had gone off to college and would return to Louisville during breaks to write and practice new material. Returning to the Walfords' basement, the group would spend hours repeating the same guitar riff and then adding in layers of nuance on top of it. After rehearsals, McMahan took practice tapes home and worked on vocals with the use of a 4-track tape recorder. Sitting in his parents' car made it possible to record softly spoken vocals over the band's loud music. After developing these new songs, Slint's members wanted a cleaner sound than that of their first LP, so they approached Minneapolis producer Brian Paulson who had recorded two albums with McMahan's former bandmates' group Bastro. On a trip to visit Bastro and Paulson during the recording sessions for their final studio album, Sing the Troubled Beast, McMahan was in a near-fatal car accident. While in the ambulance, a paramedic called in "Code 138" and the immobilized McMahan regained consciousness singing the Misfits song "We Are 138". McMahan's brush with death left him feeling depressed, which affected the recording and aftermath of Slint's next album.

=== 1991: Spiderland and dissolution ===
Paulson and Slint met over a weekend to record Spiderland in Chicago. It was recorded live, with vocals overdubbed in no more than two takes and with little to no rehearsal on the part of McMahan. The group used two different microphones to record vocals: one for softer, spoken voices, and one for louder, sung voices. During mixdown, Paulson and the group tried adding different effects, but all these were rejected, resulting in a very pared-down production sound. The day after Spiderland's recording session ended, McMahan was rumored to have checked himself into a mental hospital where he was diagnosed with depression, ending the band.

Will Oldham, a longtime friend of the band, took numerous photos of the group as potential album covers. Some were taken in a nearby quarry and one was chosen with Slint's four members' heads bobbing above the surface of the water. Touch and Go released Spiderland in 1991. The album was unlike anything else that the label had released to date. Slint was to have gone on a European tour after its release, but with the band no longer together, there were no tours, interviews, photo or video shoots to promote the album. Despite this, the album's repute grew and it continued to sell several thousand copies annually in the years following its release—a considerable feat for an indie record by a defunct group—and a mystique around the record, and the artists who made it, began to grow.

Spiderland is considered a seminal work, characterized by dark, syncopated rhythms, sparse guitar lines and haunting subject matter. The record's impact was such that many fans and critics have come to consider it a foundational post-rock album. Spiderland included an address seeking a female vocalist; English songwriter PJ Harvey and future Crisis vocalist Karyn Crisis were among the applicants.

=== 1992–present: reunions and reissues ===
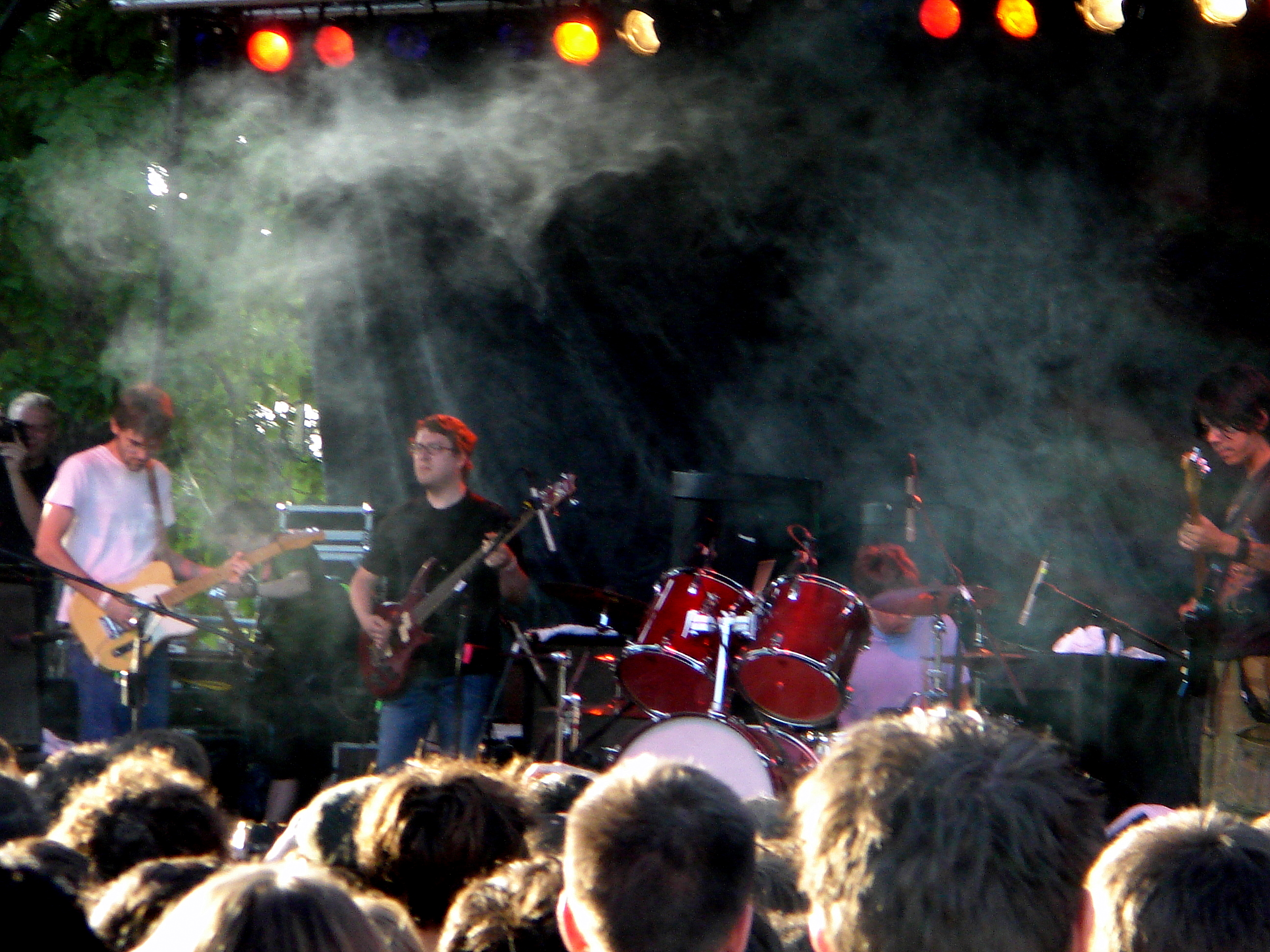
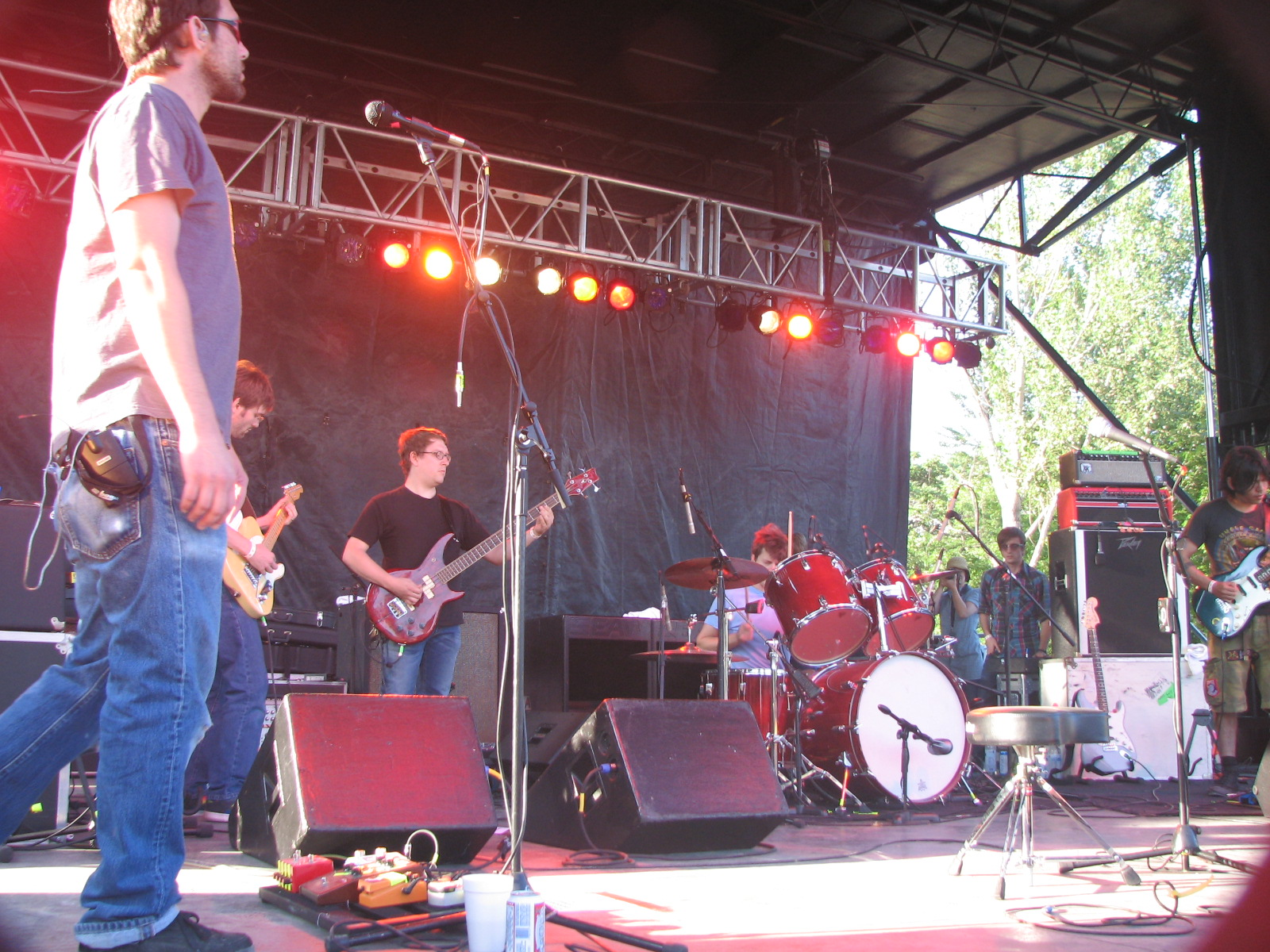
Slint at the 2007 Pitchfork Music Festival

The band briefly reformed in 1992, and again in 1994. During this time, Touch and Go Records reissued Tweez in 1993, and in 1994 an untitled 10" EP of the two songs from the shelved tapes recorded between their two albums—one a reinterpretation of "Rhoda" from Tweez, and the other a track called "Glenn".

Members of Slint have since appeared in a number of bands. Pajo has been a member of Dead Child, Tortoise, Palace, The For Carnation, Household Gods, the short-lived Billy Corgan-fronted rock band Zwan, and as of 2021, Gang of Four. In 2009, he performed with Yeah Yeah Yeahs as a live back-up musician. He briefly played in Stereolab, took up bass in Interpol, and performs under the moniker PAJO and occasionally with his band Papa M, also known as Aerial M, or just M. Guitarist Brian McMahan formed The For Carnation in 1994 and also played with Will Oldham in Palace. Britt Walford played drums in Evergreen, and for The Breeders under the pseudonym Shannon Doughton on the album Pod, and as Mike Hunt on the Safari EP. Ethan Buckler has released several albums with his group King Kong featuring an ever-shifting cast of members who have occasionally included David Pajo.

Nearly fifteen years after originally disbanding, three members of Slint—Brian McMahan, David Pajo, and Britt Walford—reunited to curate the 2005 All Tomorrow's Parties (ATP) music festival in Camber Sands, England. Also in 2005, Slint played a number of shows in the U.S. and in Europe. Though they insisted the reunion was short-term, the band regrouped once again in 2007 to perform Spiderland in its entirety in Barcelona as part of the Primavera Sound Festival, in London as part of the ATP Don't Look Back series of shows, as well as at a handful of dates in Europe, the U.S. (at Chicago's Pitchfork Music Festival, the Showbox in Seattle, and the Henry Fonda Theatre in Hollywood), and Canada. In addition to performing the album and the EP Slint, they also debuted a new composition called "King's Approach", which remains unrecorded.

In a September 2012 interview conducted with Northern Irish music publication AU, David Pajo hinted at more activity from the band in the coming months: "We still communicate regularly and we've got some surprises for next year that fans will be excited about. I know I am." The band reunited in December 2013 to play as one of the headliners of the final All Tomorrow's Parties festival in Camber Sands, England.

A deluxe Spiderland boxset was announced in January 2014. In 2014 Touch and Go released several live, demo, and practice sessions of songs recorded by the band between 1989 and 1990. These appeared as the LP Bonus Tracks, as well as in box set editions of Spiderland alongside the DVD Breadcrumb Trail, filmmaker Lance Bangs' 90-minute documentary about the band shot over the course of 12 years. In 2014, the band also performed at the Primavera Sound music festival in Spain and Portugal and Green Man Festival in Wales. The group has no plans to record new material and have since disbanded after their most recent reunions in 2013 and 2014.

== Style and influence ==
The band is noted for having syncopated guitar riffs, drastically altering dynamics, and complex song structures and time signatures. McMahan's and Walford's vocals comprised hushed spoken words, singing, and strained screaming. Artists that influenced Slint include Leonard Cohen, Neil Young, Nick Cave, Madonna, Philip Glass, Minutemen and Big Black.

Rachel Devine of The List called Spiderland "arguably the most disproportionately influential [album] in music history". It is regarded as a highly influential forerunner of the math-rock genre, with Pitchfork's Stuart Berman noting how the album "motivated a cluster of semi-popular bands in the late-90s and early 2000s to adopt its whisper-to-scream schematic. It's the boundless inspiration it perpetually provides for all the bands that have yet to emerge from the basement."

Additionally, they have come to be regarded as one of the pioneers of post-rock, Spiderland being described as "the ur-text for what became known as post-rock, a fractured, almost geometric reimagining of rock music stripped of its dionysiac impulse." Mogwai's Stuart Braithwaite was struck by the "psychic playing" evident on Spiderland, stating "when I heard it, it was unlike anything I'd heard before. I still don't know if I have heard anything else like it, now. Obviously a lot of bands take a lot from it – I know that we did."

== Members ==
=== Core members ===
- David Pajo – guitar (1986–1991, 1992, 1994, reunions)
- Britt Walford – drums, guitar, vocals (1986–1991, 1992, 1994, reunions)
- Ethan Buckler – bass (1986–1987)
- Brian McMahan – vocals, guitar (1986–1991, 1992, 1994, reunions)
- Todd Brashear – bass (1988–1991, 1992)

=== Former touring members ===
- Michael McMahan – guitar (2005, 2007, 2013–2014)
- Todd Cook – bass (2005, 2007)
- Matt Jencik – bass (2007, 2013–2014)

=== Session musicians ===
- Tim Ruth – bass (1994)

== Discography ==
=== Studio albums ===
- Tweez (1989)
- Spiderland (1991)

=== EPs ===
- Untitled (1994)
