= Britt Walford =

American musician (born 1970)

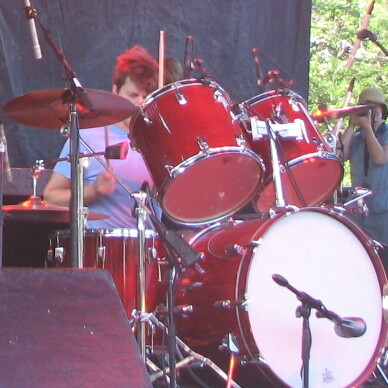
- Walford performing with Slint in 2007

Background information
- Also known as: Mike Hunt; Shannon Doughton
- Born: March 16, 1970 (age 56); Louisville, Kentucky, U.S.
- Genres: Post-hardcore; hardcore punk; post-rock; math rock
- Occupation: Musician
- Instruments: Drums; guitar; vocals
- Years active: 1982–present
- Formerly of: The Breeders; Slint; Watter; Squirrel Bait

Britt Walford (born March 16, 1970) is an American musician best known for being the drummer, co-founder, and occasional guitarist for the post-rock band Slint.

== Early life ==
Walford grew up in Louisville, Kentucky and attended the J. Graham Brown School, an experimental school based on self-learning and direction in early adolescence where he also met Brian McMahan, the future lead singer of Slint.

== Career ==
He was a member of the punk band Squirrel Bait, but was replaced by Ben Daughtrey when he quit to play with future Slint guitarist David Pajo in the band Maurice. After the breakups of Squirrel Bait and Maurice, some of the members joined to form the band that would become Slint. In 1989, Walford joined Pixies bassist Kim Deal in her new project The Breeders at the request of Steve Albini (under the pseudonyms Shannon Doughton & Mike Hunt), with whom he recorded their first album, Pod (1990), also appearing for live performances in drag to suit his stage name. After Slint's break-up in November 1990, Walford remained semi-active in the music scene, eventually in underground New York jazz bands and playing for bands such as Evergreen and friend Brian McMahan's The For Carnation project.

Walford was the unnamed subject of The Jesus Lizard song "Mouth Breather" from the album Goat, which describes the outcome of an episode wherein producer Steve Albini asked Walford to house-sit for him.

Walford later joined Watter, whose first album, for the label Temporary Residence, was released in 2014. Also in 2014 he appeared in the music video for Kim and Kelley Deal's song "Biker Gone", for which he also provided the drums.

Walford left Watter sometime after 2014, only being credited as a guest on their 2017 release History of the Future.
