= Brian McMahan =

American guitarist and singer

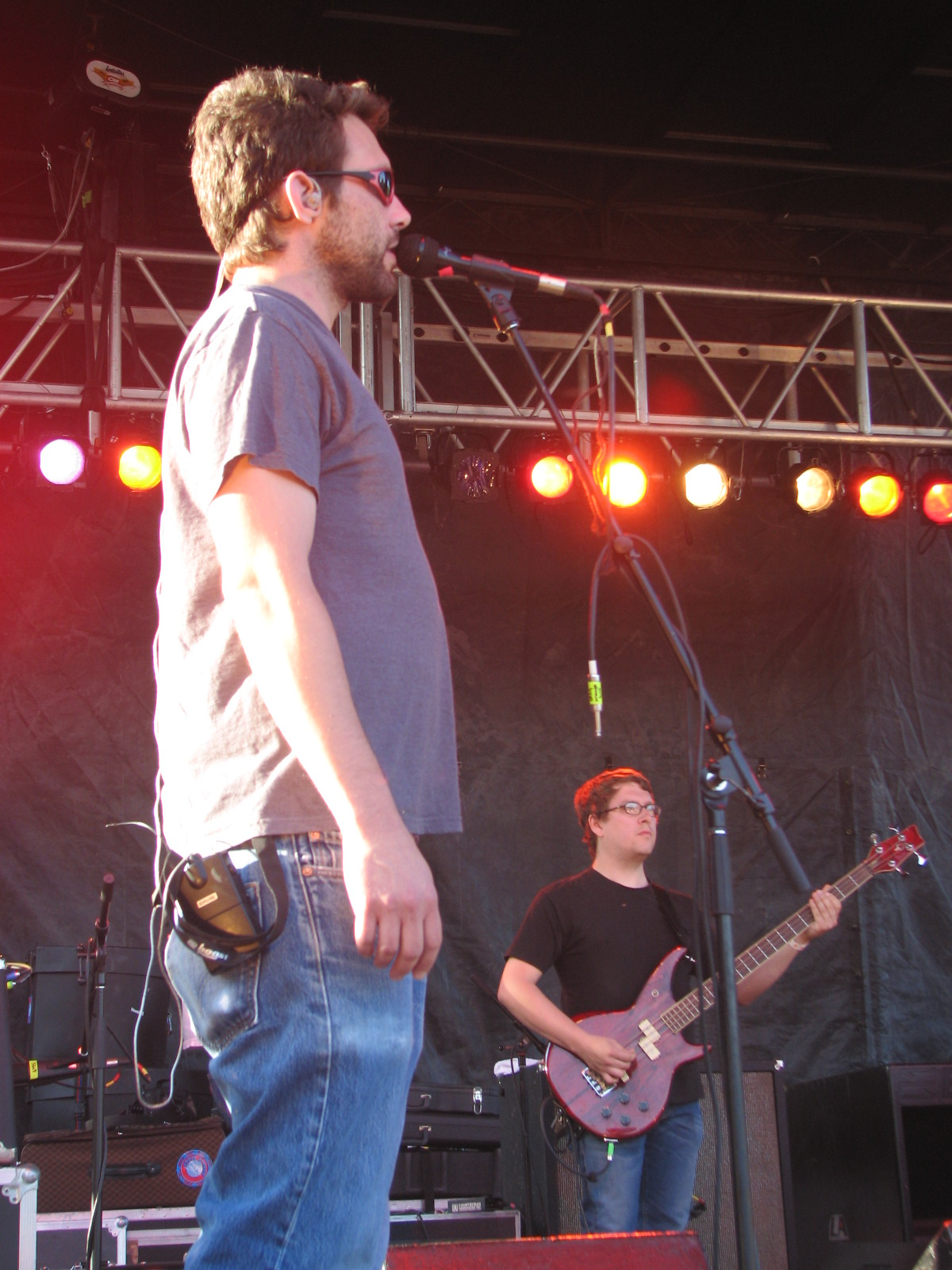
- McMahan (left) performing with Slint in 2007

Background information
- Born: January 26, 1969 (age 57); Louisville, Kentucky, U.S.
- Genres: Post-rock, math rock, slowcore, post-hardcore
- Occupation: Musician
- Instruments: Guitar, vocals
- Years active: 1983–2000, 2005–present
- Member of: The For Carnation
- Formerly of: Slint, Squirrel Bait

Brian McMahan (born January 26, 1969) is an American musician from Louisville, Kentucky. He was a guitarist and vocalist in the seminal rock bands Squirrel Bait and Slint. After the breakup of the latter in November 1990, he went on to play with Will Oldham on his project Palace Brothers. In 1994, McMahan formed The For Carnation which acted as a creative outlet; he remains the only permanent member of the band. He was also part of King Kong, a band formed by original Slint bassist Ethan Buckler. McMahan plays guitar on the song "Why I'm So Unhappy" by Dntel.
