= Jim White (drummer) =

Australian musician

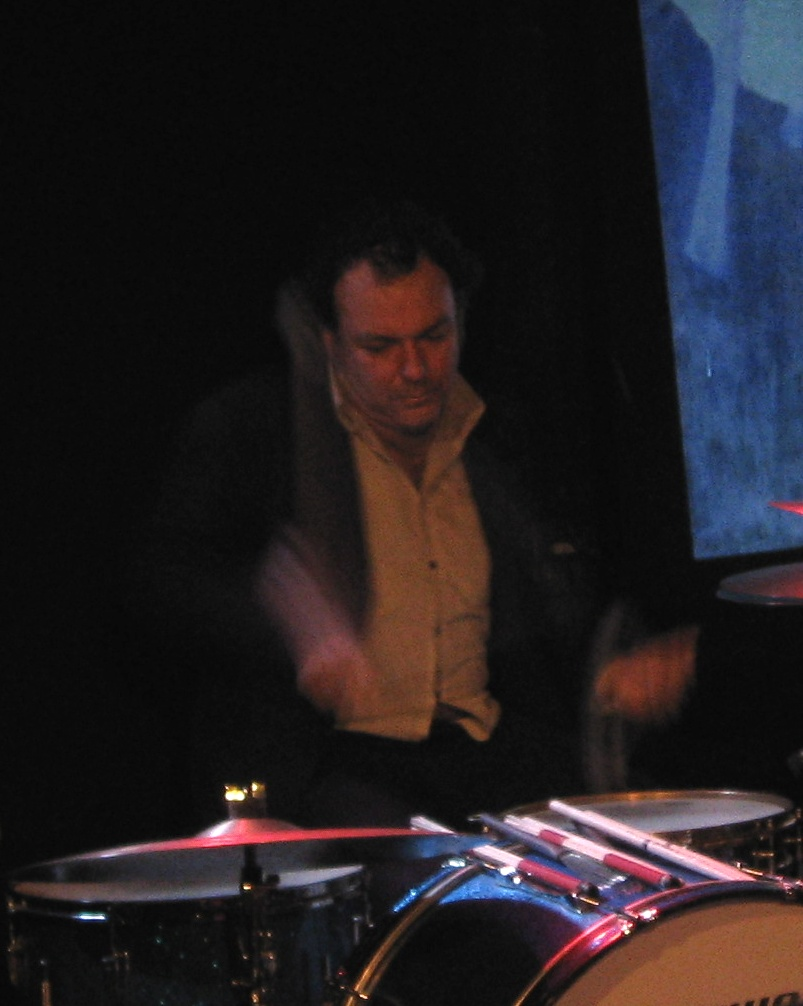
- White as a member of Tren Brothers, performing at Mercury Lounge in New York City, January 2008

Background information
- Born: Jim Ronald White; 1962 (age 63–64); Melbourne, Victoria, Australia
- Genres: Instrumental rock, noise rock
- Occupations: Drummer, songwriter, producer
- Instruments: Drums, percussion
- Years active: 1980–present
- Labels: Bella Union, Anchor & Hope, Fat Cat, ABC Music
- Member of: Dirty Three, Xylouris White, The Hard Quartet, The Double
- Formerly of: The Blackeyed Susans, Kim Salmon's STM, Venom P. Stinger, The Tren Brothers, Springtime, Happy Orphans
- Website: anchorandhope.com

Jim Ronald White (born 1962) is an Australian drummer, songwriter and producer. In 1992 he formed Dirty Three, an instrumental rock band, with fellow mainstays Warren Ellis on violin; and Mick Turner on guitar.

White has also played with various other artists including PJ Harvey, Mark Kozelek, Bonnie Prince Billy, Cat Power, Courtney Barnett & Kurt Vile, Smog, The Blackeyed Susans, Kim Salmon's STM, Venom P. Stinger, The Tren Brothers, and Nina Nastasia. More recently, White has recorded and performed with Xylouris White, a duo formed with Cretan lute player Giorgos Xylouris, and The Hard Quartet, an underground rock supergroup including Stephen Malkmus, Matt Sweeney, and Emmett Kelly.

== Early life ==
White was born in 1962 and grew up in Clifton Hill, Victoria.

== Career ==
In 1980, as a drummer, White formed Happy Orphans with Conway Savage on piano and backing vocals. Late the following year he joined noise rock group, The People with Chairs up Their Noses, alongside Mark Barry on bass guitar, David Palliser on saxophone and lead vocals, and Jim Shugg on lead guitar. In 1982 they issued a split single on Au Go Go Records with their two tracks, "Road to Egg" and "The New Band", backed by a track from fellow Melbourne rockers Plays with Marionettes (see the Wreckery). When performing White provided percussion by using an "ironing board covered with letter boxes and other domestic detritus".

Also in 1982 White, with Shugg on lead guitar and lead vocals, rejoined Savage in a country rock group, Feral Dinosaurs. He sometimes played in both The People with Chairs up Their Noses and Feral Dinosours on the same night. Other members of Feral Dinosaurs were Nick Danyi on saxophone and David Last on double bass and vocals. By late 1983 The People with Chairs up Their Noses had disbanded and White continued with Feral Dinosaurs. In 1984 they provided a cover version of Don Gibson's 1958 hit, "Blue Day", on the various artist's compilation album, Asleep at the Wheel, for Au Go Go Records. Feral Dinosaurs released two singles, "Ramblin' Man" and "50 Miles from Home", followed by an EP in December 1985, You've All Got a Home to Go To, on the Major Records label before disbanding in 1986.

In 1985 White formed another band, Venom P. Stinger, as an avant-rock ensemble with Dugald Mackenzie on lead vocals (ex-Sick Things, Brainshack); Alan Secher-Jensen on bass guitar (Brainshack, Beachnuts); and Mick Turner on guitar (Sick Things, Fungus Brains, The Moodists). They issued their debut album, Meet My Friend Venom (1986), but disbanded in 1989 when Turner returned to Fungus Brains. White had drummed for Hessian Sax during 1988 to 1989 and for Conway Savage & the Deep South in 1989. Venom P. Stinger's second album, What's Yours Is Mine, was released in October 1990. The group reformed in 1991 with MacKenzie, Turner and White joined by Nick Palmer on lead vocals. In November they issued a four-track EP, Waiting Room. The group toured the United States and released a live album, Live (in Davis), in 1992. By the end of the year White and Turner had left Venom P. Stinger.

In 1992 White and Turner formed an instrumental rock group, Dirty Three, with Warren Ellis on violin (ex-These Future Kings). The trio recorded a cassette, Dirty Three, as a give-away at early gigs. In the same year White and Ellis were also working in the rock bands, The Blackeyed Susans, Kim Salmon's STM and Charles Marshall and the Body Electric. The following year White and Turner reformed Venom P. Stinger, and recorded another album, Tear Bucket, which appeared in 1996. In 1994 White and Ellis backed Tex, Don and Charlie on a national tour. In June that year Dirty Three issued their self-titled album on Torn & Frayed Records for which Australian musicologist, Ian McFarlane, praised White's "sympathetic drumming".

In November 1994 they released an album in the US, Sad & Dangerous, which included tracks from their 1992 give-away cassette. From March 1995 the trio toured the US and completed 200 gigs by year's end. In July Sad & Dangerous was issued in Australia. The group followed with further studio albums: Horse Stories (September 1996), Ocean Songs (March 1998), Whatever You Love, You Are (March 2000), She Has No Strings Apollo (February 2003), Cinder (October 2005) and Toward the Low Sun (February 2012). Almost all of Dirty Three's material is co-written by White with Ellis and Turner.

In mid-1998 White and Turner formed an instrumental duo, The Tren Brothers, and issued a five-track self-titled EP. Most of The Tren Brothers material is written by Turner and White. In January 2000 White and Ellis backed Nick Cave on his tour of Australia.

In 2003 White backed Nina Nastasia and subsequently was recorded on her albums Run to Ruin (2003) and On Leaving (2006). On 28 May 2007 the pair released a collaborative album, You Follow Me. It was co-produced by White, Nastasia and Kennan Gudjonsson. AllMusic's Thom Jurek noted that White "is not an accompanist here, he is a collaborator, even though he didn't write the songs", with the production emphasising his "full of bassy tom toms and wispy brushwork" where White "floats, digs, sputters, halts, and pushes through the music, just as [Nastasia's] playing guitar and singing does".

In 2013 he started playing with Anderson Henderson White.

White formed Xylouris White in 2013, a collaboration with Greek singer and laouto player George Xylouris. The duo's music has been described as combining "free-jazz, avant-rock and ages-old Greek folk traditions." To date they have released five albums, produced by Guy Picciotto (Fugazi), and undertaken numerous world tours.

In collaboration Dan Luscombe and Gareth Liddiard wrote the score of Warwick Thornton's 2021/2 vampire TV series, Firebite; White joined them to perform the music for the series.

== Personal life ==
When not performing or recording, as of 2012, White was living in New York City.

== Collaborations ==
Jim White has also played with a number of other artists, including:

- Boxhead Ensemble – musical collective including Scott Tuma, Jim O'Rourke, Will Oldham (aka Bonnie 'Prince' Billy)
- Will Oldham aka Bonnie 'Prince' Billy – on several albums
- Scott Tuma - On the album Hard Again Jim plays drums on a track titled 'Jim White' aka 'Baby'
- Cat Power – since 1996 on various albums and tours, then as member of the Dirty Delta Blues since 2007
- Beth Orton
- Daniel Blumberg
- Smog aka Bill Callahan
- White Magic – live drummer (periodically) with this New York based group, recorded on their debut release.
- Essie Jain, New York singer-songwriter – drummer on We Made This Ourselves (2007)
- PJ Harvey – White Chalk (2007)
- C. W. Stoneking – Jungle Blues (2008)
- Marianne Faithfull – Easy Come, Easy Go (2008)
- Nina Nastasia - on a number of albums, and as collaborator on You Follow Me (2007)
- Seeker Lover Keeper – producer and drummer.
- George Xylouris, Cretan laouto player, on three albums as Xylouris White.
- Sun Kil Moon - on the album I Also Want to Die in New Orleans (2019).
- Courtney Barnett and Kurt Vile - Lotta Sea Lice (2017).
- Luluc on the album Sculptor (2018).
- Marisa Anderson – The Quickening (2020) and Swallowtail (2024)
- Myriam Gendron, Mayday, 2024
- Ed Kuepper, After the Flood, 2025

An October 2007 article in Time Out New York called him "indie rock's drummer of choice", saying, "Those who play with White speak of him with the ardor of religious converts."
