= Live! At Meredith =

Live album by Dirty Three
- Released: 2005
- Recorded: 11 December 2004
- Genre: Instrumental rock
- Length: 76:06
- Label: Anchor & Hope
- Producer: Mick Turner

Dirty Three chronology
She Has No Strings Apollo (2003)	Live! At Meredith (2005)	Cinder (2005)

Live! At Meredith is a live album by the Australian trio, Dirty Three. It is a self-released (Anchor & Hope) - their label - that was initially sold on tour but now available via Anchor & Hope website. Chris Thompson mixed the album for radio station JJJ's 'Live at the Wireless'. It was recorded live by him and Leah Baker at Meredith Music Festival, Victoria (Australia) on 11 December 2004.

== Track listing ==
1. "Indian Love Song" - 12.19
2. "Some Summers They Drop Like Flies" - 9.27
3. "She Has No Strings" - 10.10
4. "Hope" - 7.26
5. "Alice Wading" (+ "No Stranger Than That") - 13.46
6. "Everything is Fucked" - 7.19
7. "Deep Waters" - 15.39
