= ARIA Award for Best Alternative Release =

Australian music award

- Country: Australia
- Presented by: Australian Recording Industry Association (ARIA)
- First award: 1994
- Currently held by: Ecca Vandal, Looking for People to Unfollow (2026)

Highlights
- Most wins: Regurgitator and You Am I (2 each)
- Most nominations: You Am I (5)
- Website: ariaawards.com.au

The ARIA Music Award for Best Alternative Release is an award presented at the annual ARIA Music Awards. The ARIA Awards recognise "the many achievements of Aussie artists across all music genres", and have been given by the Australian Recording Industry Association (ARIA) since 1987.

To be eligible for this award, the album must be of an Adult Alternative genre by solo artists and groups; recordings must be directed toward Adult Alternative formats; the recording cannot be entered in any other genre category. Formerly, only album recordings were eligible. Best Adult Alternative Album was judged by a specialist judging school of representatives experienced with the genre.

Best Adult Alternative Album was first handed out in 1994. Up until 2001 it was called Best Alternative Release, which was awarded for an album or single release. From 2002 to 2009 the award was discontinued before being reinstated in 2010 as Best Adult Alternative Album. Again, from 2012 to 2015, the award was not presented until the 2016 awards and did not return until 2026, when the name reverted to Best Alternative Release.

You Am I and Regurgitator are the only artists to win twice in this category. You Am I have received the most nominations with five, followed by Dirty Three, Regurgitator and Spiderbait with three and Magic Dirt, Nick Cave and the Bad Seeds and Something for Kate with two. Martyn P. Casey, Nick Cave, Warren Ellis and Jim Sclavunos have earned three nominations each as members of Nick Cave and the Bad Seeds and Grinderman. Ellis was the only musician nominated as part of two acts in the same year, as in 1997 he was nominated as a member of both Dirty Three and Nick Cave and the Bad Seeds. Sarah Blasko became the first solo winner in 2016 for her album Eternal Return.

== Winners and nominees ==
In the following table, the years are listed as per the ARIA Award ceremony.

Table key
| ‡ | Indicates the winner |

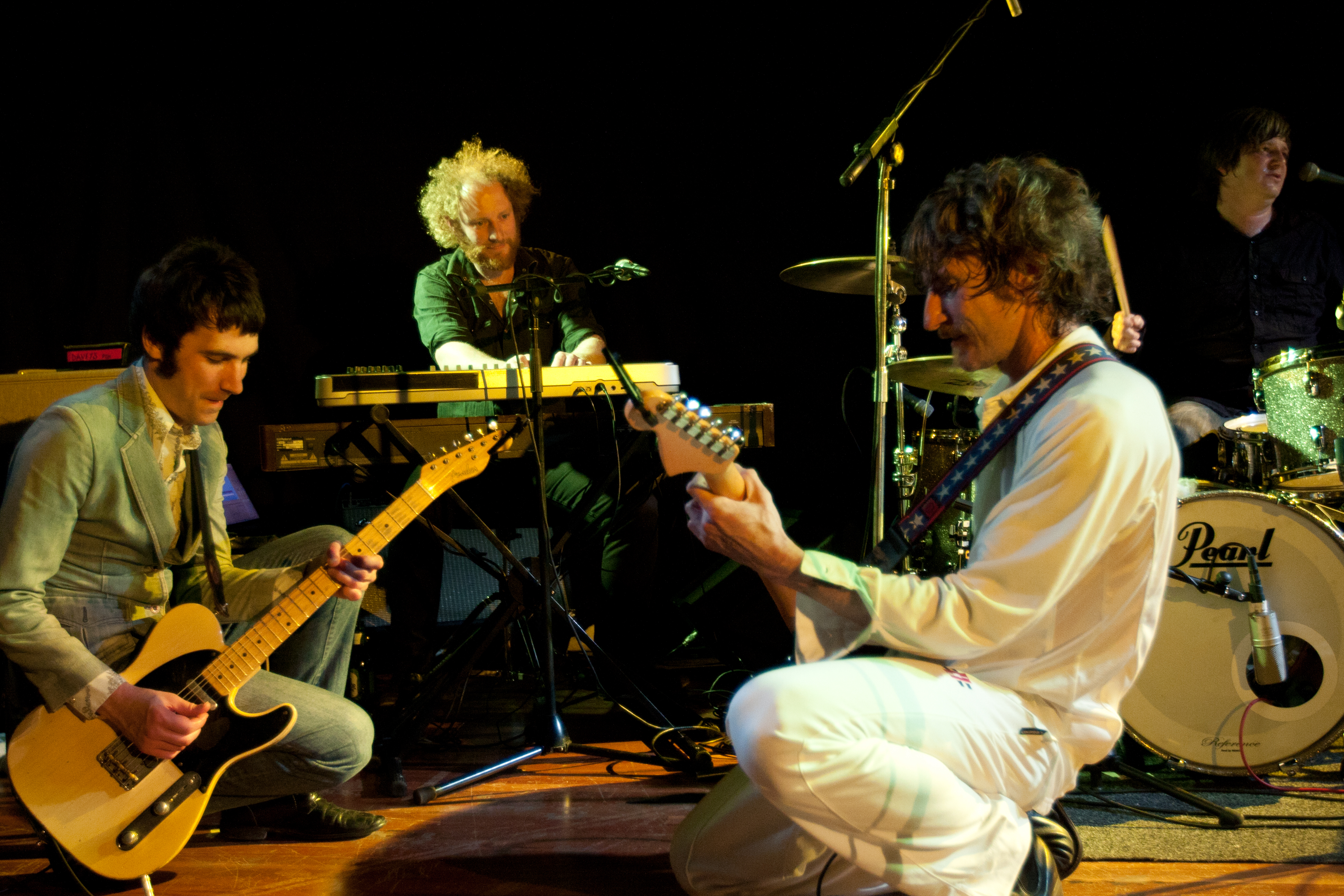
You Am I won the award twice in 1994 and 1995. They have also received the most nominations with five.

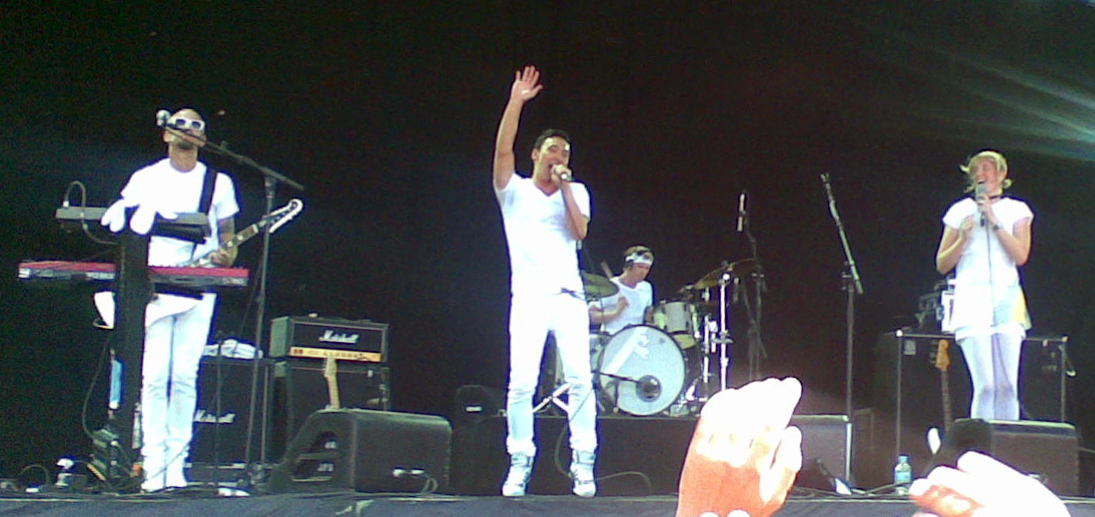
Regurgitator won the award twice in 1996 and 1998.

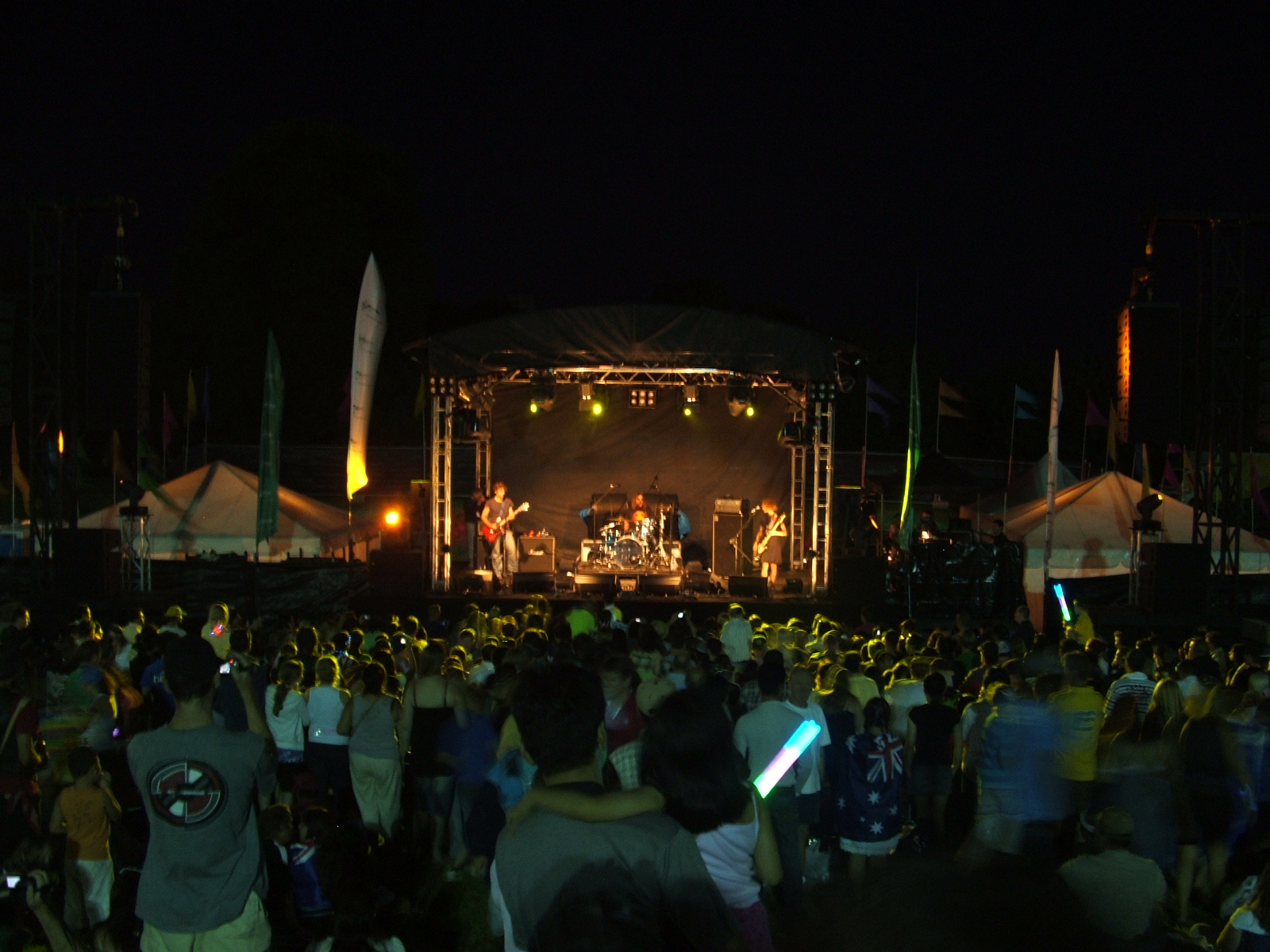
Spiderbait were the winners in 1997 for their album Ivy and the Big Apples.

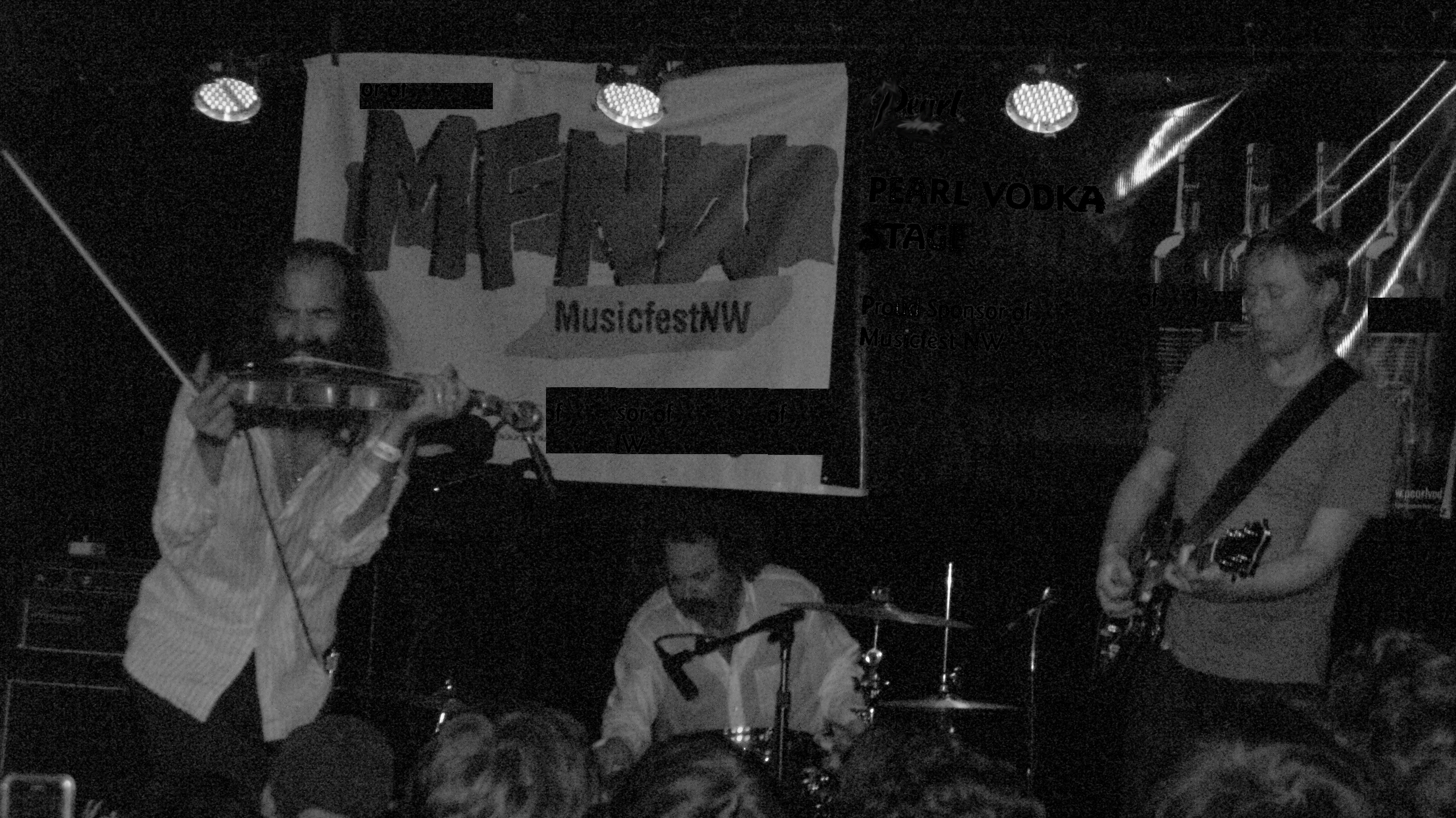
Dirty Three won the award in 2000 for their album Whatever You Love, You Are.

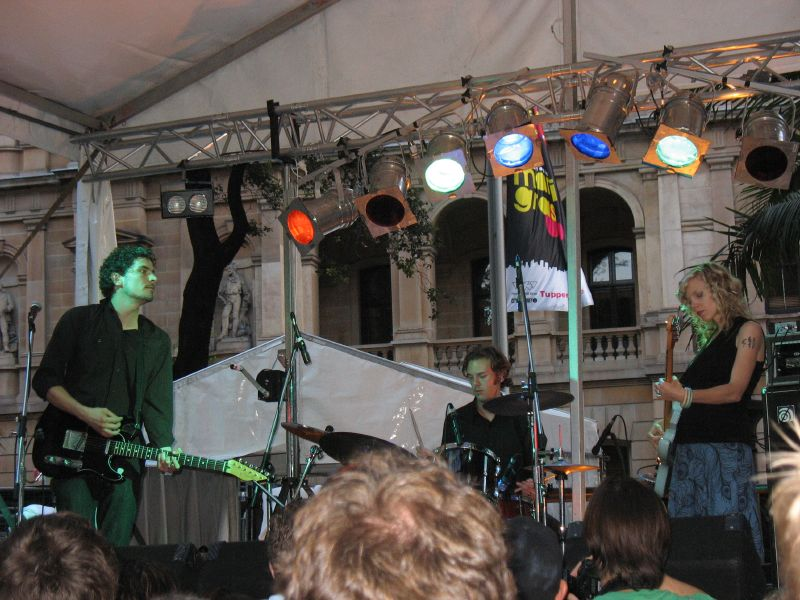
Art of Fighting received the award in 2001 for their album Wires.

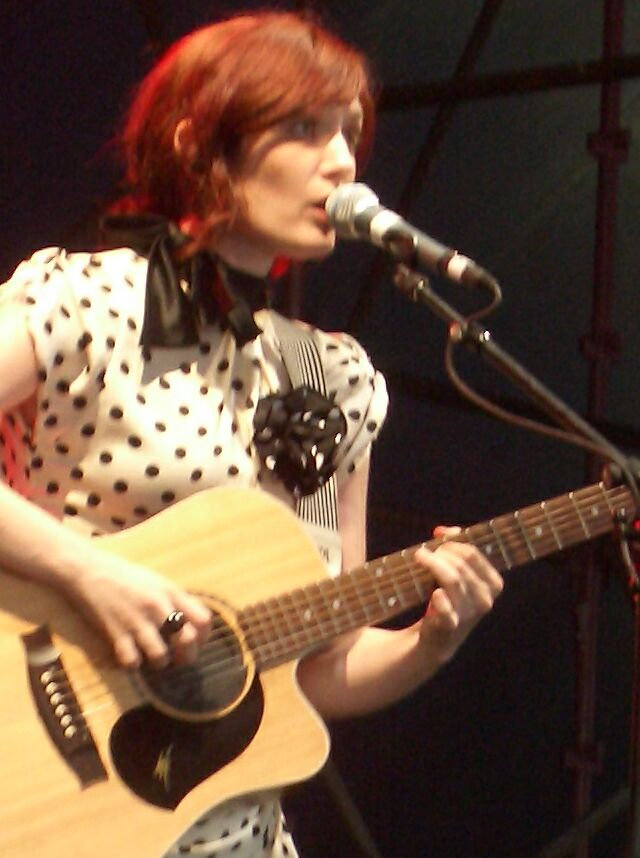
Sarah Blasko is the first solo artist to win. She received the award in 2016 for her album Eternal Return.

| Year | Artist | Album title | Ref. |
|---|---|---|---|
| 1994 (8th) | You Am I‡ | Sound as Ever | |
| 1994 (8th) | The Clouds | Thunderhead | |
| 1994 (8th) | Crow | My Kind of Pain | |
| 1994 (8th) | The Cruel Sea | The Honeymoon Is Over | |
| 1994 (8th) | Dave Graney & the Coral Snakes | Night of the Wolverine | |
| 1995 (9th) | You Am I‡ | Hi Fi Way | |
| 1995 (9th) | Custard | Wahooti Fandango | |
| 1995 (9th) | Magic Dirt | Life Was Better | |
| 1995 (9th) | Regurgitator | Regurgitator | |
| 1995 (9th) | Silverchair | Frogstomp | |
| 1996 (10th) | Regurgitator‡ | Tu-Plang | |
| 1996 (10th) | Nick Cave and the Bad Seeds | Murder Ballads | |
| 1996 (10th) | Pollyanna | Long Player | |
| 1996 (10th) | Spiderbait | The Unfinished Spanish Galleon of Finley Lake | |
| 1996 (10th) | You Am I | Hourly, Daily | |
| 1997 (11th) | Spiderbait‡ | Ivy and the Big Apples | |
| 1997 (11th) | Dirty Three | Horse Stories | |
| 1997 (11th) | Nick Cave and the Bad Seeds | The Boatman's Call | |
| 1997 (11th) | The Fauves | Future Spa | |
| 1997 (11th) | Powderfinger | Double Allergic | |
| 1998 (12th) | Regurgitator‡ | Unit | |
| 1998 (12th) | Dirty Three | Ocean Songs | |
| 1998 (12th) | The Living End | "Second Solution / Prisoner of Society" | |
| 1998 (12th) | The Paradise Motel | Flight Paths | |
| 1998 (12th) | You Am I | #4 Record | |
| 1999 (13th) | Not from There‡ | Sand on Seven | |
| 1999 (13th) | Gerling | Children of Telepathic Experiences | |
| 1999 (13th) | Tim Rogers | What Rhymes with Cars and Girls | |
| 1999 (13th) | Something for Kate | Beautiful Sharks | |
| 1999 (13th) | Spiderbait | Grand Slam | |
| 1999 (13th) | Tendrils | Soaking Red | |
| 2000 (14th) | Dirty Three‡ | Whatever You Love, You Are | |
| 2000 (14th) | 28 Days | "Rip It Up" | |
| 2000 (14th) | David Bridie | Act of Free Choice | |
| 2000 (14th) | Nokturnl | "Neva Mend" | |
| 2000 (14th) | Tumbleweed | Mumbo Jumbo | |
| 2001 (15th) | Art of Fighting‡ | Wires | |
| 2001 (15th) | Big Heavy Stuff | Size of the Ocean | |
| 2001 (15th) | Magic Dirt | What Are Rockstars Doing Today | |
| 2001 (15th) | Something for Kate | Echolalia | |
| 2001 (15th) | You Am I | Dress Me Slowly | |
| 2002 - 2009 | No award given. | | |
| 2010 (24th) | Angus & Julia Stone‡ | Down the Way | |
| 2010 (24th) | Basement Birds | Basement Birds | |
| 2010 (24th) | Clare Bowditch | Modern Day Addiction | |
| 2010 (24th) | The Cat Empire | Cinema | |
| 2010 (24th) | Washington | I Believe You Liar | |
| 2010 (24th) | Whitley | Go Forth, Find Mammoth | |
| 2011 (25th) | Boy & Bear‡ | Moonfire | |
| 2011 (25th) | Grinderman | Grinderman 2 | |
| 2011 (25th) | Little Red | Midnight Remember | |
| 2011 (25th) | Seeker Lover Keeper | Seeker Lover Keeper | |
| 2011 (25th) | The Panics | Rain on the Humming Wire | |
| 2012 - 2015 | No award given. | | |
| 2016 (30th) | Sarah Blasko‡ | Eternal Return | |
| 2016 (30th) | Jarryd James | Thirty One | |
| 2016 (30th) | Matt Corby | Telluric | |
| 2016 (30th) | Peter Garrett | A Version of Now | |
| 2016 (30th) | The Temper Trap | Thick as Thieves | |
| 2017 - 2025 | No award given. | | |
| 2026 (40th) | Ecca Vandal‡ | Looking for People to Unfollow | |
| 2026 (40th) | Gang of Youths | "Things Take Time" | |
| 2026 (40th) | Genesis Owusu | Redstar Wu & the Worldwide Scourge | |
| 2026 (40th) | Meg Mac | It's My Party | |
| 2026 (40th) | Tame Impala | Deadbeat | |

== Artists with multiple wins ==
2 wins

- Regurgitator
- You Am I

== Artists with multiple nominations ==
6 nominations

- Tim Rogers (Note: Including five as a member of You Am I.)

5 nominations

- You Am I
- Warren Ellis (Note: Three as a member of Dirty Three and one each as a member of Nick Cave and the Bad Seeds in 1997 and Grinderman.)

3 nominations

- Martyn P. Casey (Note: Two as a member of Nick Cave and the Bad Seeds and one as a member of Grinderman.)
- Nick Cave
- Dirty Three
- Regurgitator
- Jim Sclavunos
- Spiderbait

2 nominations

- Sarah Blasko (Note: Including one as a member of Seeker Lover Keeper.)
- Magic Dirt
- Nick Cave and the Bad Seeds
- Something for Kate
