= Love Changes Everything (Dirty Three album) =

Studio album by Dirty Three
- Released: 14 June 2024
- Genre: Post-rock
- Length: 41:20
- Labels: Bella Union, Drag City
- Producer: Dirty Three

Dirty Three chronology
Toward the Low Sun (2012)	Love Changes Everything (2024)

Professional ratings
Aggregate scores
Source	Rating
Metacritic	81/100
Review scores
Source	Rating
PopMatters	9/10 stars
The Guardian	4/5 stars
Pitchfork	8.0/10

Love Changes Everything is the ninth major album by Australian trio, Dirty Three. It was released 14 June 2024 in Australia and New Zealand, and 28 June 2024 in the US. It was released on vinyl, CD, cassette, and digitally.

The cover art is by guitarist Mick Turner.

== Track listing ==
Love Changes Everything track listing
No.	Title	Length
1.	"Love Changes Everything I"	4:38
2.	"Love Changes Everything II"	6:20
3.	"Love Changes Everything III"	7:48
4.	"Love Changes Everything IV"	5:55
5.	"Love Changes Everything V"	6:24
6.	"Love Changes Everything VI"	10:15
Total length:		41:20

== Personnel ==
Dirty Three

- Warren Ellis – violin, keyboards
- Mick Turner – organ, bass, guitar, artwork
- Jim White – drums

Technical

- Nick Huggins - mixing, engineering
