= Dirty Three (album) =

Studio album by Dirty Three
- Released: July 25, 1995
- Recorded: 1993–1994
- Genre: Post-rock
- Length: 49:23
- Label: Touch and Go
- Producer: Phil McKellar

Dirty Three chronology
Sad & Dangerous (1995)	Dirty Three (1995)	Horse Stories (1996)

Professional ratings
Review scores
Source	Rating
AllMusic	4/5 stars
NME	7/10
Spin	8/10
Uncut	3/5 stars

Dirty Three is the self-titled second major recording by Australian trio, the Dirty Three. The album was recorded between 1993 and 1994 at Studio 325, Melbourne, Australia. ‘Kim’s Dirt’ is a longer version to the trio's other recording of the track, which is on their previous release Sad & Dangerous.

Cover art by guitarist Mick Turner.

== Track listing ==
1. "Indian Love Song" – 10:11
2. "Better Go Home Now" – 3:43
3. "Odd Couple" – 5:09
4. "Kim's Dirt" (Kim Salmon) – 11:48
5. "Everything's Fucked" – 5:32
6. "The Last Night" – 6:55
7. "Dirty Equation" – 6:02

== Personnel ==
Dirty Three

- Warren Ellis - violin, space belt, piano, accordion, kalimba
- Jim White - drums, percussion
- Mick Turner - guitar, cover artwork

with:

- Tony Wyzenbeek - harmonica
- Annie Hormer - rear sleeve photography
- Karen H. - Dirty Three photography
- Phil McKellar - producer, engineer
