= Anderson Henderson White =

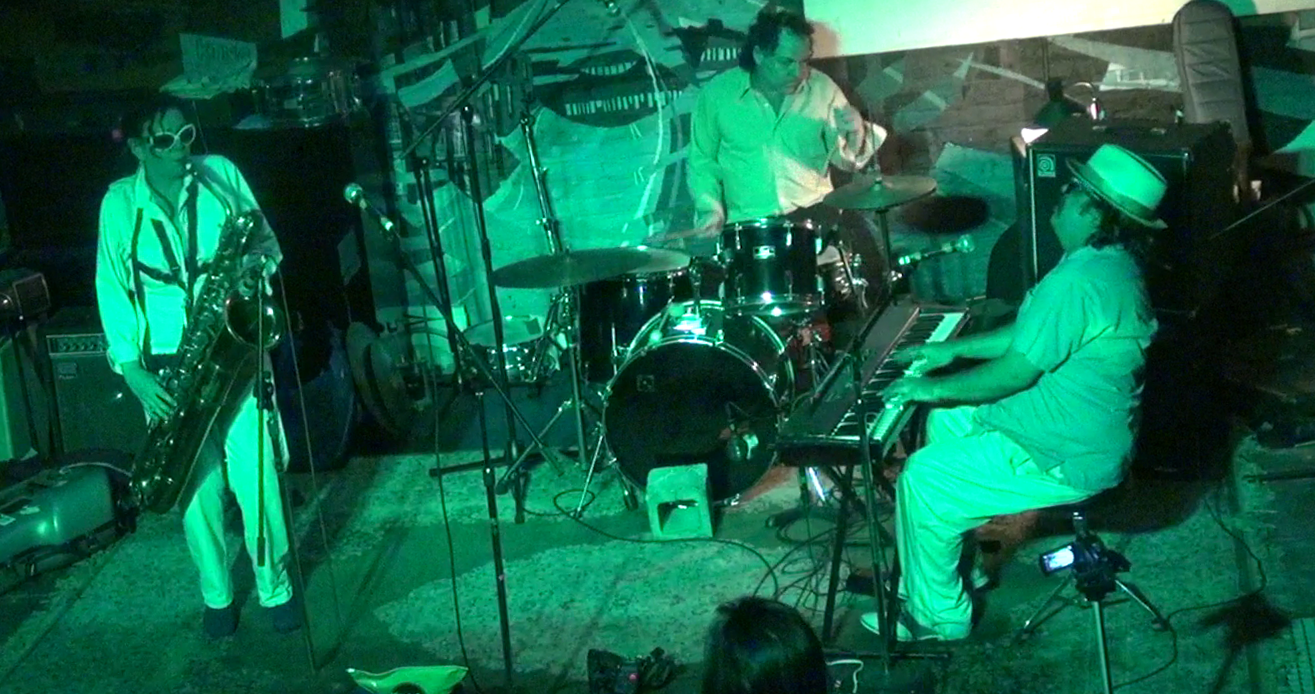
- Anderson Henderson White at BPM Studios in Brooklyn

Background information
- Origin: New York City, New York, United States
- Genres: Country
- Years active: 2013–present
- Member of: Burnt Sugar

Anderson Henderson White is a New York City-based trio featuring Reverend Vince Anderson, Paula Henderson of Burnt Sugar and Melvin Van Peebles wid Laxative, and Jim White of the Dirty Three. Formed in June 2013, their debut performance was described as "an electrifying, psychedelic debut". They described their music as 'free country'. They have performed at shows with Burnt Sugar.
