= All Became Golden =

Studio album / Video album by Essie Jain
- Released: 28 June 2013
- Label: Vimeo On Demand

All Became Golden is British singer-songwriter Essie Jain's first audio visual album. It was released worldwide on June 28, 2013. This is a collaboration by Jain and filmmaker Natalie Johns (La Blogoteque), featuring compositions and arrangements from Nico Muhly Two Boys, Björk. The film documents the artists' progress, as they convene to simultaneously rehearse, perform and record the album.

The audio visual release trailer premiered on Huffington Post, while lifestyle magazine BlackBook premiered two more songs from the project, along with an interview with Jain.

The film and the score were recorded in 2 days at the DiMenna Center for Classical Music in New York City in February 2012. Performers taking part include Nadia Sirota, Caleb Burhans and Rob Moose, along with a guest appearance by guitarist Larry Campbell of The Levon Helm band. The album yielded a single, "Raise You".

Previous releases by Jain were We Made This Ourselves, and Jain's album of music for children, Until The Light Of Morning.

The album's nine tracks were authored by Jain and arranged by Muhly, with the exception of a cover of Dire Straits' "Why Worry".

Film director Johns has described this project like so: "No one has ever made a record like this, and in this way, it was a collaboration between Essie, Nico and myself, and the result is innovative, modern and honest." Muhly has been quoted to the effect: "I really liked the idea of doing it live in front of cameras, because you can see there's no trick to making music like this happen".

Recording credits are given to Justin Guip of Levon Helms Studio. The album was mixed by Bob Clearmountain (Bruce Springsteen, The Rolling Stones) and mastered by Bernie Grundman (Michael Jackson, Carole King).
