= Don't Look Back (concert series) =

Annual Australian series of concerts

Don't Look Back was a yearly series of concerts in which London-based promoters All Tomorrow's Parties would ask artists and bands to play one of their seminal albums live in its entirety. The season started in London in 2005, and has since spread its wings further each year, appearing from 2006 onwards in America and Europe (ATP has hosted stages of Don't Look Back performances at Barcelona's Primavera Sound festival and the Pitchfork Music Festival in Union Park, Chicago), and in 2008 onwards in Australia.

== Previous Don't Look Back Seasons ==
Below is a listing of the years in which each album was first performed as part of the Don't Look Back concept. Some albums have seen repeat performances at later dates, while others, such as Sonic Youth, Slint, and The GZA, went on to tour with the concept. Melvins, inspired by their performance of the album Houdini recorded a CD performing it live entitled A Live History of Gluttony and Lust.

(Info sourced from,)

=== 2005 ===
- Belle and Sebastian – If You're Feeling Sinister
- Cat Power – The Covers Record
- Dinosaur Jr. – You're Living All Over Me
- Dirty Three – Ocean Songs
- Gang of Four – Entertainment!
- Jon Spencer Blues Explosion – Orange
- The Lemonheads – It's a Shame About Ray
- Melvins – Houdini
- Mudhoney – Superfuzz Bigmuff Plus Early Singles
- múm – Yesterday Was Dramatic – Today Is OK
- Sophia – The Infinite Circle
- The Stooges – Fun House

=== 2006 ===
- Girls Against Boys – Venus Luxure No.1 Baby
- Green on Red – Gas Food Lodging
- Isis – Oceanic
- Low – Things We Lost in the Fire
- John Martyn – Solid Air
- Ennio Morricone – Classic Film Soundtracks
- Teenage Fanclub – Bandwagonesque
- Tindersticks – Tindersticks II
- Tortoise – Millions Now Living Will Never Die

=== 2007 ===
- Comets on Fire – Blue Cathedral
- Cowboy Junkies – The Trinity Session
- GZA/Genius – Liquid Swords
- The House of Love – The House of Love (1st Creation LP)
- Redd Kross – Born Innocent
- Slint – Spiderland Amsterdam, Bruxelles, Paris, Bologna, Rome, Barcelona, Glasgow
- Sonic Youth – Daydream Nation (Time Out London's Number One Best Gig of 2007)

=== 2008 ===
- Died Pretty – Doughboy Hollow
- Ed Kuepper – Honey Steel's Gold
- The Scientists – Blood Red River
- Sebadoh – Bubble & Scrape London, Barcelona, Chicago
- Raekwon (with special guest Ghostface Killah) – Only Built 4 Cuban Linx London
- Public Enemy – It Takes a Nation of Millions to Hold Us Back London, Manchester, Glasgow, Barcelona, Chicago, Nottingham
- Mission of Burma – Vs. Chicago
- Meat Puppets – Meat Puppets II New York, London
- Thurston Moore – Psychic Hearts New York
- Bardo Pond – Lapsed New York
- Built to Spill – Perfect from Now On New York, London
- Fantômas – The Director's Cut Minehead, London

A repeat performance for 2008 was Tortoise – Millions Now Living Will Never Die in New York.

=== 2009 ===
- Dirty Three – Ocean Songs Mount Buller
- The Saints – (I'm) Stranded Melbourne & Sydney
- X – At Home with You Melbourne
- Devo – Q: Are We Not Men? A: We Are Devo! London
- Sleep – Holy Mountain Minehead – May
- Young Marble Giants – Colossal Youth Minehead – May
- Sunn O))) – The Grimmrobe Demos Primavera Sound Festival – May
- Suicide – Suicide New York – September
- The Feelies – Crazy Rhythms New York – September
- The Drones – Wait Long by the River and the Bodies of Your Enemies Will Float By New York – September
- Sufjan Stevens – Seven Swans New York – September
- Boris – Feedbacker New York – September
- Spiritualized – Ladies and Gentlemen We Are Floating in Space London – October
- Spiritualized – Ladies and Gentlemen We Are Floating in Space London – December
- Harmony Rockets – Paralyzed Mind Of The Archangel Void Nightmare Before Christmas Festival, England – December
- Sunn O))) – The Grimmrobe Demos Ten Years Of ATP Festival, England – December
- Yeah Yeah Yeahs – Fever To Tell Ten Years Of ATP Festival, England – December
- Papa M – Live from a Shark Cage Ten Years Of ATP Festival, England – December

Repeat performances for 2009 include Dirty Three – Ocean Songs at ATP Australia: Mount Buller, Australia in January and at ATP New York in September.

=== 2010 ===
- Dirty Three – Ocean Songs – Melbourne, Sydney, Brisbane, Perth – January
- Laughing Clowns – History of Rock n' Roll Part 1 – Melbourne, Sydney, Brisbane – January
- Ennio Morricone – performing Classic Film Soundtracks – London – April
- The Stooges – Raw Power London – May and New York – September
- Suicide – Suicide London – May (supporting The Stooges)
- Spiritualized – Ladies and Gentlemen We Are Floating in Space – Minehead, England – May
- The Raincoats – The Raincoats London – May
- The Scientists – Blood Red River New York – September
- Mudhoney – Superfuzz Bigmuff Plus Early Singles New York – September

A repeat performance for 2010 was Sleep performing Holy Mountain in New York in September.

=== 2011 ===
- Mercury Rev – Deserter's Songs – London, England – May
- Meat Puppets – Up On The Sun – Butlins, Minehead – May
- The Frogs – It's Only Right And Natural – Butlins, Minehead – May
- The Flaming Lips – The Soft Bulletin – London, England – July
- Dinosaur Jr – Bug – London, England – July
- Deerhoof – Milk Man – London, England – July
- Public Enemy – Fear of a Black Planet – I'll Be Your Mirror USA, Asbury Park

A repeat performance for 2011 was Thurston Moore performing Psychic Hearts in London in December.

=== 2012 ===
- Robyn Hitchcock – I Often Dream of Trains – Minehead, England – March
- Slayer – Reign In Blood – London, England – May

Repeat performances for 2012 include The Raincoats performing their debut LP at the request of Jeff Mangum at Minehead in March.
