= Toward the Low Sun =

Studio album by Dirty Three
- Released: 24 February 2012
- Studio: Head Gap (Melbourne); Sing Sing (Melbourne)
- Genre: Post-rock
- Length: 41:55
- Label: Bella Union, Drag City
- Producer: Dirty Three

Dirty Three chronology
Cinder (2005)	Toward the Low Sun (2012)	Love Changes Everything (2024)

Professional ratings
Aggregate scores
Source	Rating
Metacritic	78/100
Review scores
Source	Rating
PopMatters	8/10 stars
The Guardian	4/5 stars
Pitchfork	6.8/10
Consequence of Sound	C+
Spin	7/10

Toward the Low Sun is the eighth major album by Australian trio, Dirty Three. It was released the 24 February 2012, in the US.

The cover art is by guitarist Mick Turner.

== Track listing ==
Toward the Low Sun track listing
No.	Title	Length
1.	"Furnace Skies"	4:44
2.	"Sometimes I Forget You've Gone"	3:46
3.	"Moon On The Land"	4:51
4.	"Rising Below"	5:47
5.	"The Pier"	4:53
6.	"Rain Song"	3:50
7.	"That Was Was"	4:01
8.	"Ashen Snow"	5:13
9.	"You Greet Her Ghost"	4:50
Total length:		41:55

== Personnel ==
Dirty Three

- Warren Ellis – violin, keyboards
- Mick Turner – organ, bass, guitar, artwork
- Jim White – drums

Technical

- Casey Rice – recording, mixing
- Adam Rhodes - recording
