= Venom P. Stinger =

Australian noise rock band

- Origin: Melbourne, Victoria, Australia
- Genres: Noise rock; post-punk; experimental rock
- Years active: 1985–1988, 1990–1996, 2010
- Labels: Aberrant; Au Go Go; Siltbreeze
- Spinoffs: Dirty Three
- Past members: Dugald Mackenzie; Alan Secher-Jensen; Mick Turner; Jim White; Nick Palmer

Venom P. Stinger were an Australian noise rock band, formed in 1985. The original line-up was Dugald Mackenzie on lead vocals, Alan Secher-Jensen on bass guitar, Mick Turner on guitar, and Jim White on drums. They disbanded in 1988 and reformed two years later, they disbanded again in 1996. The group issued three albums, Meet My Friend Venom (January 1987), What's Yours Is Mine (October 1990) and Tear Bucketer (1996).

Turner and White joined violinist Warren Ellis to form a post-rock band, Dirty Three in 1992. Dugald Mackenzie died of cancer in October 2004 and Alan Secher-Jensen died in May 2019.

== History ==
Venom P. Stinger were formed in Melbourne in 1985 by Dugald Mackenzie on lead vocals (ex-Sick Things, Brainshack), Alan Secher-Jensen on bass guitar (ex-Brainshack, Beachnuts), Mick Turner on guitar (ex-Sick Things, Fungus Brains, The Moodists), and Jim White on drums (ex-People with Chairs Up Their Noses, Feral Dinosaurs). Turner later cited the Birthday Party, Flipper, Dead Kennedys and the Saints, as early influences on the band.

Venom P. Stinger's debut album, Meet My Friend Venom, appeared in January 1987 via No Master's Voice. Australian musicologist, Ian McFarlane, felt, "tracks like 'P.C.P. Crazy' and 'Venom P. Stinger' were clattering slices of avant-rock with absolutely no concession to commercial gains." AllMusic's Brendan Swift declared, "[the album is] completely uncompromising and uncommercial." They followed it with a single, "Walking About", in June 1988 before disbanding.

Secher-Jensen, Turner and White reassembled Venom P. Stinger in 1990 with Nick Palmer as lead vocalist. Soon after the release of the band's second album, What's Yours Is Mine (October 1990), via Aberrant Records, they embarked on an American tour. After leaving the group, Dugald Mackenzie, moved to Adelaide, South Australia, and died of cancer in October 2004. Patrick Emery of The Sydney Morning Herald, described Mackenzie, "[his] lyrics were laced with angst, catharsis and invective... [his] life followed the arc of punk-rock tragedy; his incandescent personality burnt out forever in 2004. Songs such as 'PCP Crazy', 'Going Nowhere' and 'Walking About' captured the nihilistic punk existence."

The group issued a live album, Live (in Davis) (1992) and followed with a third album, Tear Bucketer (1996), before disbanding in 1996. McFarlane summarised their career, "[they] took the experimental avant-garde route to its logical conclusion with an unnerving sound that thrived on raw energy, a complex rhythmic base and unconventional song structures." Writing for Spin, music critic Byron Coley described their sound, "magnificent, speedy scuzz-rock that blurs the distinctions between punk and noise like 40 stiff beers." Their influence has been detected in a wide range of bands, from the likes of Halo of Flies and other American stalwarts of Amphetamine Reptile Records, to more recent Australian groups such as Melbourne's Eddy Current Suppression Ring.

Between commitments to Venom P. Stinger, Turner and White had joined violinist, Warren Ellis, to form a post-rock band, Dirty Three in late 1992. In 2013 American independent label Drag City reissued the original line-up's catalogue on a compilation album, Venom P. Stinger 1986–1991. Alan Secher-Jensen died in May 2019.

== Members ==
- Dugald Mackenzie – lead vocals (1985–89, died 2004)
- Alan Secher-Jensen – bass guitar (1985–89,1991–92,1993–96, died 2019)
- Mick Turner – lead guitar (1985–89, 1991–92, 1993–96)
- Jim White – drums (1985–89, 1991–92, 1993–96)
- Nick Palmer – lead vocals (1991–92, 1993–96)

== Discography ==
=== Studio albums ===
- Meet My Friend Venom (January 1987) – No Masters Voice
- What's Yours Is Mine (October 1990) – Aberrant Records
- Tearbucketer (1996, US import-only) – Siltbreeze

=== Live albums ===
- Live (in Davis) (1992) – Anopheles
