= Lonely People of the World, Unite! =

Studio album by Devin Davis
- Released: March 15, 2005
- Genre: Indie
- Label: Mousse Records

Professional ratings
Review scores
Source	Rating
Allmusic	4.5/5 stars

Lonely People of the World, Unite! is the first album by Devin Davis, released March 15, 2005. All songs were written by Devin Davis.

The album's title is sung at the end of the song "Giant Spiders".

== Track listing ==
1. "Iron Woman" – 2:16
2. "When I Turn Ninety-Nine" – 3:06
3. "Turtle and the Flightless Bird" – 3:42
4. "Moon over Shark City" – 2:19
5. "Cannons at the Courthouse" – 4:10
6. "Transcendental Sports Anthem" – 3:48
7. "Sandie" – 3:11
8. "Paratrooper with Amnesia" – 2:15
9. "Giant Spiders" – 3:44
10. "The Choir Invisible" – 3:49
11. "Deserted Eyeland" – 3:30

== Personnel ==
- Devin Davis - Lead Vocals, Guitar, Piano, Drums, Art Direction
