= Cinder (album) =

Studio album by Dirty Three
- Released: 11 October 2005
- Recorded: February 2005
- Genre: Post-rock, folk rock
- Length: 70:00
- Label: Touch and Go Records
- Producer: Dirty Three

Dirty Three chronology
She Has No Strings Apollo (2003)	Cinder (2005)	Toward the Low Sun (2012)

Professional ratings
Aggregate scores
Source	Rating
Metacritic	79/100
Review scores
Source	Rating
AllMusic	4/5 stars
Pitchfork	6.7/10

Cinder is the seventh major album by Australian trio, Dirty Three. Conceived in the summer of 2005 on Phillip Island, in South Eastern Australia, the songs are shorter, more trimmed down and classic in composition than usual Dirty Three output.

Recorded in just 10 days, Cinder's 19 tracks includes violin, drums, mandolin, bouzouki, organ, piano, acoustic guitar, bagpipes, and, rarely for a Dirty Three album, vocals.

Chan Marshall also lends her talents to the album with some vocals, as well as co-writing one of the songs.

Cover art by guitarist Mick Turner.

== Track listing ==
All tracks by Dirty Three except where noted.

1. "Ever Since" – 4:48
2. "She Passed Through" – 3:26
3. "Amy" – 2:48
4. "Sad Jexy" – 3:23
5. "Cinders" – 3:02
6. "Doris" – 3:26
7. "Flutter" – 6:36
8. "The Zither Player" (Félix Lajkó)– 5:01
9. "It Happened" – 2:14
10. "Great Waves" – 3:28 (vocals by Chan Marshall)
11. "Dream Evie" – 2:43
12. "Too Soon, Too Late" – 3:29
13. "This Night" – 3:56
14. "Rain On" – 3:39
15. "Ember" – 2:38
16. "Michèle" – 3:23
17. "Feral" – 4:10 (vocals by Sally Timms of The Mekons)
18. "Last Dance" – 4:16
19. "In Fall" – 3:54

Japanese bonus tracks

20. "June's A Calling" – 1:50
21. "Lisa's Mountain" – 2:57

== Personnel ==
- Warren Ellis – mandolin, piano, violin, viola, bouzouki
- Chan Marshall – vocals
- Casey Rice – engineer, mixing
- Mark Saul – bagpipes
- Sally Timms – vocals
- Mick Turner – organ, bass, guitar, cover art
- Jim White – drums
