= The Tren Brothers =

Australian musical duo

Tren Brothers
- Origin: Melbourne, Australia
- Genres: Instrumental rock
- Years active: 1998 - present
- Label: Drag City (US)
- Members: Mick Turner; Jim White
- Website: http://www.anchorandhope.com/trenbrothers.htm

The Tren Brothers are an Australian instrumental rock duo, consisting of guitarist Mick Turner and drummer . Turner and White are two-thirds of the critically acclaimed instrumental rock trio Dirty Three; additionally, Turner also is a solo recording artist working under his own name.

In addition to their own recordings, the duo served as Cat Power's band on her breakthrough album Moon Pix, as well as Will Oldham's band on the Western Music EP.

== Discography ==
Singles and EPs

- Tren Brothers EP (Drag City, 1998)
- Kit's Choice/Gone Away 7" (Secretly Canadian, 1998)
- Swing Pts. 1&2 7" (as Tren Brothers & Sister, with Jessica Billey on violin) (Chapter Records, CH34, 2000)
- The Swimmer (Western Vinyl, 2005)
- Tren Brothers/Bridezilla (band) Split 7' Sometimes/Forth & Fine (Inertia (independent record company), 2009)

Compilations

- Blue Trees, an album compiling out of print, and rare tracks of both Tren Brothers and Mick Turner. (Drag City, 2007)
