= Devin Davis (musician) =

American singer-songwriter

- Origin: Clinton, Iowa, United States
- Genre: Indie
- Occupation: Musician
- Instruments: Piano, saxophone, guitar, drums
- Years active: 2005-present
- Website: www.devindaviswebsite.com

Devin Davis is a Chicago-based American indie musician. Growing up in Clinton, Iowa, he started playing music when he was five years old; from the piano to the saxophone and guitar, Devin tried his hand at numerous musical styles, soon graduating to first a drumming role in a Marching Band, and later a band called Irving Philharmonic, in Jacksonville.

== Career ==
A chance job engineering at ACME Recording in Chicago gave Devin the opportunity to work on his debut solo record, Lonely People of the World, Unite!. Inspired by the long hours he spent working on the record, mostly alone at night, the album combines pop energy with classic '60s pop song craft, calling to mind Sloan and The New Pornographers.

== Discography ==
=== Albums ===
- Lonely People of the World, Unite! (2005)

=== Compilation appearances ===
- "When the Angels Lift Our Eyelids in the Morning" on The Sound the Hare Heard, Kill Rock Stars, 2006
