= Ocean Songs =

Studio album by Dirty Three
- Released: March 1998
- Recorded: August–September 1997
- Studios: Electrical Audio, Chicago, Illinois
- Genre: Post-rock
- Length: 66:32
- Label: Touch and Go
- Producers: Steve Albini, Dirty Three

Dirty Three chronology
Horse Stories (1996)	Ocean Songs (1998)	Whatever You Love, You Are (2000)

Ocean Songs is the fourth major album by Australian rock band Dirty Three, released in March 1998 by Touch and Go Records. It was recorded at Electrical Audio in Chicago during August and September 1997. Its cover was designed by guitarist Mick Turner. David Grubbs plays piano and harmonium on some tracks.

A special version was issued by their UK record label Bella Union in 2005, containing the original album and a live DVD.

In 2005, the entire album was performed live in London as part of the All Tomorrow's Parties-curated Don't Look Back series. It was later performed in Barcelona, and in Mt. Buller, Australia and as part of the 2009 ATP New York Festival (curated by The Flaming Lips).

== Reception ==
Professional ratings
Review scores
Source	Rating
AllMusic	4.5/5 stars
Entertainment Weekly	A−
Mojo	4/5 stars
NME	8/10
Pitchfork	7.8/10
Rolling Stone	3.5/5 stars
Uncut	4/5 stars

Rolling Stone Australia said, "Eschewing the now patented violin-led raveups, the Dirty Three turned the atmosphere up to 11. With Warren Ellis playing sans distortion for the first time, Ocean Songs ebbs and flows with its own inevitable momentum: quiet, reflective and painstakingly slow."

AllMusic considered the album "easily their most controversial, and a decided change in direction. The music here keeps all tempos reigned in and all instrumental flurries to a minimum, creating the feeling of waves lapping and pouring into and out of one another. It's as if the D3 were on a vessel, playing to the ocean itself."

CMJ New Music Monthly said, "The wildly varying dynamics and experimental asides of S&D are absent here, but in their place is a more consistent, quietly intense song cycle. [But] on some tracks, the Three's arrival at fever pitch is so gradual, so hypnotic, that it's easy to coast right past the fact that they're beating the living tar out of their instruments."

In October 2010, Ocean Songs was listed in the book 100 Best Australian Albums.

== Track listing ==
All compositions by Mick Turner, Warren Ellis, Jim White

1. "Sirena" – 4:06
2. "The Restless Waves" – 5:09
3. "Distant Shore" – 5:50
4. "Authentic Celestial Music" – 10:04
5. "Backwards Voyager" – 4:34
6. "Last Horse on the Sand" – 4:52
7. "Sea Above, Sky Below" – 6:04
8. "Black Tide" – 4:35
9. "Deep Waters" – 16:27
10. "Ends of the Earth" – 5:11

Special Edition DVD

1. "Last Horse on the Sand"
2. "Distant Shore"
3. "Authentic Celestial Music"
4. "Sue's Last Ride"
5. "Deep Waters"

=== 2021 Deluxe edition ===
Disc one

2021 Remaster of original album

Disc two – Recorded live at ATP

1. "Sirena" – 5:16
2. "The Restless Waves" – 7:26
3. "Distant Shore" – 4:46
4. "Authentic Celestial Music" – 9:39
5. "Backwards Voyager" – 3:17
6. "Sea Above, Sky Below" – 8:50
7. "Last Horse on the Sand" – 4:30
8. "Black Tide" – 3:45
9. "Deep Waters" – 16:27

Note: Recorded live September 11, 2009 at Kutsher's Hotel and Country Club, Monticello, NY, USA

== Personnel ==
Dirty Three

- Warren Ellis – violin, viola, piano (10)
- Mick Turner – guitars, melodica, loops
- Jim White – drums, percussion

Additional personnel

- David Grubbs – piano (4, 5), harmonium (4, 5, 7)
- Nick Cave – piano (Deluxe edition disc two)
- Steve Albini – producer, engineer
