= Art of Fighting (band) =

Indie rock band from Melbourne, Australia

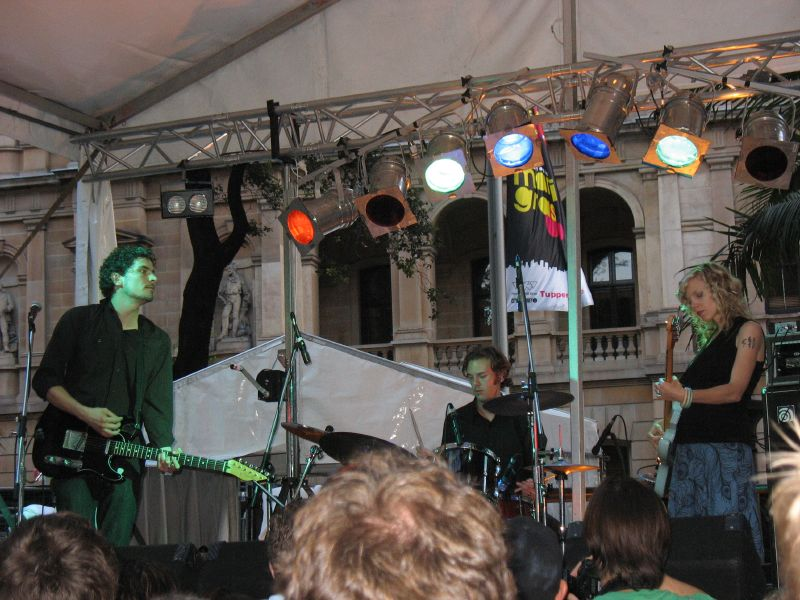
- Art of Fighting performing at St Jeromes Laneway Festival

Background information
- Origin: Melbourne, Victoria, Australia
- Genre: Indie rock
- Years active: 1995–present
- Labels: Trifekta (Current); Bella Union (UK and Europe); Half A Cow; Au Go Go Records
- Members: Ollie Browne; Peggy Frew; Miles Browne; Marty Brown
- Past members: Cameron Grant
- Website: www.artoffighting.com

Art of Fighting are an Australian indie rock band from Melbourne. They won the ARIA Award for Best Adult Alternative Album in 2001 for their album Wires.

== History ==
=== 1995-2000: Early years and EPs ===
The band formed in 1995 as a duo, with Ollie Browne playing guitar and Peggy Frew on bass, with both taking turns on vocals. The couple were also in a romantic relationship at this time, though they were to split amicably later.

They were joined six months later by drummer Cameron Grant, and over the following two years released two demo tapes, the first self-titled and the second named The Angry Man. Two of the tracks from the latter, "The Chorus is Suffering" and "You and Me on Mars" were included on the Wonder from a Quarter Acre compilation put out by Au Go Go Records in 1998.

In 1997, the trio began recording The Very Strange Year. During touring for this EP but before its release, Ollie Browne's brother, Miles Browne, joined the group playing guitar and trumpet. The Very Strange Year was released on Half a Cow Records at the end of 1998.

In the middle of 1999 the foursome began recording another EP for Half a Cow, Empty Nights, which was released in November of that year. Cameron Grant left the band in late 2000, being replaced on drums by Marty Brown (also of Sodastream).

=== 2001-2005: Trifekta years ===
Following a move to Trifekta Records, in March 2001 the band released their debut full-length album, Wires. The album did not chart, but at the ARIA Music Awards of 2001, the album won ARIA Award for Best Adult Alternative Album, beating the more high-profile You Am I, Something for Kate and Magic Dirt. Its release also gave rise to numerous international touring opportunities for the group. In 2021, it was named the 159th greatest Australian album of all time by Rolling Stone Australia.

Their second album, Second Storey, was released in 2004, once again engendering a burst of touring both local and international. In a coup for the band, Bella Union released the album in the UK and Europe.

=== 2006-present: Remote Control Records years ===
At the end of 2006, the release of first single "Eastbound" preceded a forthcoming album titled Runaways released on 10 March in Australia, on Remote Control Records. In April 2007 the band played at All Tomorrow's Parties (curated by Dirty Three) in Minehead UK, which was followed by two live shows in Tokyo.

In 2008 the band scored an original soundtrack for the Australian film Ten Empty and in 2010 saw Ollie create a new group called Parallel Lions.

In 2019 the band released the single "Your Love", announced a new album and played concerts in Sydney and Melbourne. Their fourth album, Luna Low, was released in June 2019.

== Discography ==
=== Albums ===
List of albums, with selected chart positions
Title	Album details	Peak chart positions
Title	Album details	AUS
Wires	Released: March 2001; Label: Trifekta (HORSE008-2); Formats: CD	-
Second Storey	Released: August 2004; Label: Trifekta (HORSE044-2); Formats: CD, Digital download	58
Runaways	Released: March 2007; Label: Remote Control Records (RCON005CD); Formats: CD, Digital download	69
Luna Low	Released: 7 June 2019; Label: Remote Control Records (RCON112CD); Formats: CD, LP, Streaming Digital download	-

=== EP ===
List of EPs, with selected details
Title	details
Art of Fighting	Released: 1995; Label: Art of Fighting; Formats: Cassette
The Angry Man	Released: 1997; Label: Art of Fighting; Formats: Cassette
The Very Strange Year	Released: November 1998; Label: Half a Cow Records (hac74); Formats: CD
Empty Nights	Released: November 1999; Label: Half a Cow Records (hac87); Formats: CD

== Awards and nominations ==
=== ARIA Music Awards ===
The ARIA Music Awards is an annual awards ceremony that recognises excellence, innovation, and achievement across all genres of Australian music. They commenced in 1987.

Year	Nominee / work	Award	Result	Ref.
2001	Wires	ARIA Award for Best Alternative Album	Won	

=== Australian Music Prize ===
The Australian Music Prize (the AMP) is an annual award of $30,000 given to an Australian band or solo artist in recognition of the merit of an album released during the year of award. The commenced in 2005.

Year	Nominee / work	Award	Result
2019	Luna Low	Album of the Year	Longlisted
