= Whitley (singer) =

- Born: Lawrence Greenwood
- Genre: alt-folk

Whitley, the professional name of Lawrence Greenwood, is an Australian Singer and songwriter.

Whitley's album, Go Forth, Find Mammoth, was nominated for the ARIA Award for Best Adult Alternative Album.

In 2017, P.S. I'm Haunted was released under the name Lawrence Greenwood.

== Discography ==
=== Studio albums ===
List of studio albums, with selected details and chart positions
Title	Album details	Peak chart positions
Title	Album details	AUS
The Submarine	Released: September 2007; Label: Dew Process (DEW90001); Formats: CD, digital download, LP	—
Go Forth, Find Mammoth	Released: October 2009; Label: Dew Process (DEW9000220); Formats: CD, digital download	27
Even the Stars Are a Mess	Released: July 2013; Label: Dew Process (DEW9000560); Formats: CD, digital download	44
P.S. I'm Haunted	Released: 2017; Label: Little Lake; Formats: LP, digital download	—

== Awards and nominations ==
=== ARIA Music Awards ===
The ARIA Music Awards is an annual awards ceremony that recognises excellence, innovation, and achievement across all genres of Australian music. They commenced in 1987.

Year	Nominee / work	Award	Result	Ref.
2010	Go Forth, Find Mammoth	ARIA Award for Best Adult Alternative Album	Nominated	
