= Wires (album) =

Studio album by Art of Fighting
- Released: March 2001
- Recorded: November – December 2000
- Length: 55:36
- Label: Trifekta

Art of Fighting chronology
| Empty Nights (1999) | Wires (2001) | Second Storey (2004) |

Professional ratings
Review scores
| Source | Rating |
|---|---|
| AllMusic | 4/5 stars |
| Pitchfork | 6.5/10 |

Wires is the debut of album of Australian indie band Art of Fighting. The album was released in March 2001. At the ARIA Music Awards of 2001, the album won Best Alternative Release.

In 2021, it was named the 159th greatest Australian album of all time by Rolling Stone Australia.

In 2022, Art of Fighting celebrated the 21st anniversary of its release with the Wires 21st Anniversary Tour, taking place across Australia in September and October 2022. The album is scheduled to be released on vinyl for the first time.

== Reception ==
Stephen Cramer from AllMusic called it "a startlingly brilliant debut full-length album" saying "Often compared to Coldplay and Radiohead, Art of Fighting clearly stand on their own, embracing music as a religious-like experience, forgoing conventions for hushed vocals and restrained instrumental artistry. It's also important to note that, despite the sameness of tempo throughout, each song has its own formula, which, although predictable, delivers consistently powerful musical drama throughout the 11-song disc."

== Track listing ==
All tracks are written by Art of Fighting

Wires
| No. | Title | Length |
|---|---|---|
| 1. | "Skeletons" | 4:04 |
| 2. | "Give Me Tonight" | 4:37 |
| 3. | "Akula" | 5:18 |
| 4. | "Moonlight" | 4:45 |
| 5. | "I Don't Keep a Record" | 5:49 |
| 6. | "In No Good Way" | 4:35 |
| 7. | "Find You Lost" | 7:17 |
| 8. | "Reasons Are All I Have Left" | 4:30 |
| 9. | "Just Say I'm Right" | 6:09 |
| 10. | "Wires" | 1:27 |
| 11. | "Something New" | 7:04 |
| Total length: | | 55:36 |
