= Oliver Mann =

Australian opera singer and songwriter

Oliver Mann is an Australian opera singer and songwriter. He has released three albums, Oliver Mann Sings (2005), The Possum Wakes at Night (2008, Preservation Records) and Slow Bark (2013).

He has also collaborated with among others Mick Turner, Joanna Newsom (US), Bowerbirds (US), Deolinda (Portugal) and Nicola Ratti (Italy), to Sarah Blasko, Holly Throsby, Darren Hanlon, and Grand Salvo.
