= The Sound the Hare Heard =

Compilation album by Various artists
- Released: May 9, 2006
- Recorded: 2002–2005
- Genre: Indie rock
- Length: 75:07
- Label: Kill Rock Stars

Professional ratings
Review scores
Source	Rating
AllMusic	link
Pitchfork	6.0/10 link

The Sound the Hare Heard is a 2006 compilation of mostly acoustic arrangements by a number of singer-songwriters, both well-known and relatively obscure. Kill Rock Stars founder Slim Moon was the driving force behind the album, but not all of the artists on the album are signed by Kill Rock Stars; rather, the uniting factor of the compilation is the singer-songwriter status of each artist and various connecting themes between the songs.

== Track listing ==
1. "When the Angels Lift Our Eyelids in the Morning" by Devin Davis – 3:22
2. "Cast a Hook in Me" by Laura Veirs – 3:28
3. "Adlai Stevenson" by Sufjan Stevens – 1:53
4. "Feet Asleep" by Thao Nguyen – 4:24
5. "Bones for Doctor Swah" by Wooden Wand – 2:05
6. "Dancers All" by Death Vessel – 3:25
7. "Why" by Essie Jain – 5:01
8. "Daylight" by Jeff Hanson – 4:15
9. "Other Voices" by Imaad Wasif – 3:59
10. "Where in the World Are You" by Great Lake Swimmers – 3:30
11. "Stargazers Are Blind" by Owen McCarthy – 4:59
12. "The American War" by Simone White – 3:38
13. "Poor Little City Boy" by Nedelle – 3:21
14. "Dumbing Down" by Southerly – 3:18
15. "Lazy Little Ada" by Colin Meloy – 3:50
16. "The Sound You Warn" by Corrina Repp – 3:44
17. "Waves of Wonder" by The Moore Brothers – 3:07
18. "Best Friends Forever" by Aliccia BB – 2:56
19. "Kill My Love for You" by Danielle Howle – 4:03
20. "Another Song About the Darkness" by Lauren Hoffman – 3:59
21. "Honea" by Lovers – 2:50
