= Sad & Dangerous =

Studio album by Dirty Three
- Released: 1995
- Recorded: 1992–1993
- Genre: Post-rock
- Length: 63:05
- Label: Poon Village
- Producer: Mick Turner

Dirty Three chronology
Dirty Three (cassette) (1992)	Sad & Dangerous (1995)	Dirty Three (1996)

Professional ratings
Review scores
Source	Rating
Allmusic	link

Sad & Dangerous is the first major release by the Australian trio, Dirty Three. The album, recorded live at Scuzz Studio, includes ten songs from their gig-give-away demo cassette release.

== Reception ==
Rolling Stone Australia said the album was, "Gently percussive, harshly percussive, tightly coiled and free-wheeling. The Dirty Three's second disc was steeped in the same exhilarating contradictions as their riveting live performances, invariably an emotional roller-coaster." The genre was described as, "As close to jazz as rock and roll, and a fair way from both."

== Track listing ==
1. "Kim's Dirt" (Kim Salmon) – 10:37
2. "Killy Kundane" – 7:10
3. "Jaguar" – 5:03
4. "Devil In The Hole" – 4:20
5. "Jim's Dog" – 6:30
6. "Short Break" – 3:21
7. "Turk Reprise" – 3:44
8. "You Were A Bum Dream" - 5:06
9. "Warren's Waltz" - 7:04
10. "Turk" - 10:09

== Personnel ==
Dirty Three

- Warren Ellis - violin, bass on "Jim's Dog"
- Jim White - percussion
- Mick Turner - guitar, bass, engineer

Technical

- Julian Wu - producer, engineer on "Turk Reprise"
