= Jeff Hanson =

American singer-songwriter

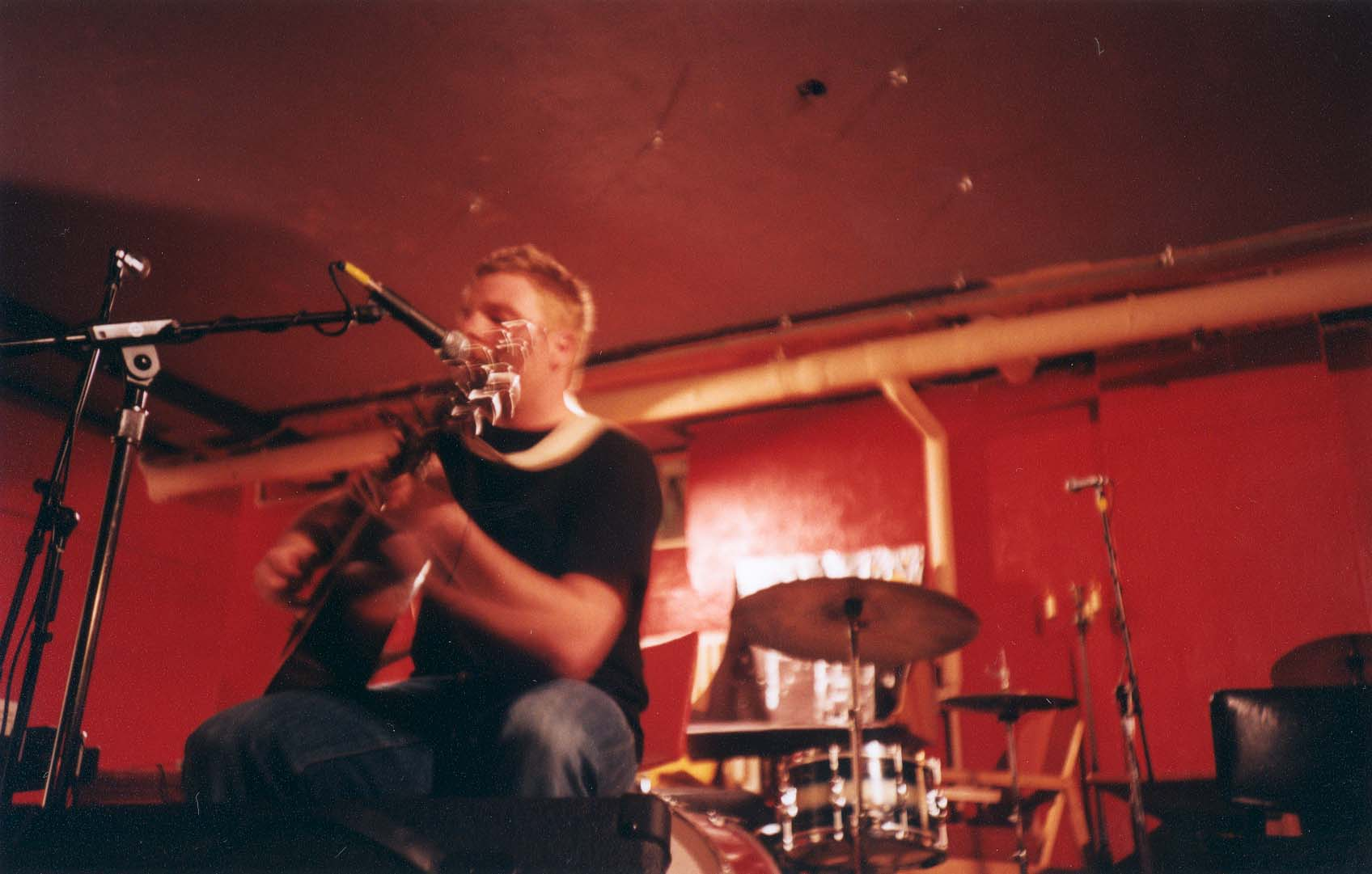

Background information
- Born: March 3, 1978; Milwaukee, Wisconsin, U.S.
- Died: June 5, 2009 (aged 31) Saint Paul, Minnesota, U.S.
- Genres: Alternative rock, indie rock, indie pop, acoustic
- Occupations: Singer-songwriter, guitarist and multi-instrumentalist
- Instruments: Guitar, vocals, piano
- Years active: 2000–2009
- Label: Kill Rock Stars
- Website: www.jeffhanson.net

Jeff Hanson (March 3, 1978 – June 5, 2009) was an American singer-songwriter, guitarist and multi-instrumentalist, whose voice was described in a 2005 Paste review as an "angelic falsetto, a cross between Alison Krauss and Art Garfunkel that is often (understandably) mistaken for a female contralto".

Hanson's vocal style is sometimes compared to Elliott Smith's, who also was signed to Kill Rock Stars.

== Early life ==
Hanson was born in Milwaukee, Wisconsin and raised in Waukesha, Wisconsin. In a lengthy interview for the now defunct daily online magazine Splendid, he said:

"I grew up in a musical house. My parents were big music fans. And luckily for me, they were fans of really good 1960s bands like the Beatles and the Stones and the Kinks and the Who and all those bands that had such an influence, that just hit me hard at a really young age. All this really good music. You know, 26 years later, I'm still listening to it all and still liking it very much. Saturday night at my house, when I was a kid, would be record night. It would be my dad picking out all these records, and we would play them until... well, until bedtime. And that was, like, every Saturday night. So music was just such a big part of me growing up."

He started learning guitar at the age of four years and was involved in musical theatre at 10, then shortly afterwards joined a boy's choir for 3 years. By the age of 13 formed the emo/indie rock band M.I.J. with bandmates Ryan Scheife (bass) and Mike Kennedy (drums). The band released a 7" on One Percent Records, an EP and a full album on Caulfield Records and remained active for seven years.

== Career ==
He began a solo career in 2003 and was the first artist to be signed to Kill Rock Stars Records after sending in an unsolicited demo tape. He released three albums for the label, Son in 2003 and Jeff Hanson in 2005 recorded at Presto! Recording Studios with AJ Mogis and Mike Mogis. His third album titled Madam Owl was released on August 19, 2008.

The song "Hiding Behind the Moon" was used in the episode 6 of the first season of the TV series Nip/Tuck.

A previously unpublished song "Daylight" appeared on the compilation The Sound the Hare Heard in 2006.

== Personal life and death ==
In 2005 Hanson married Megan Anzelc, credited on his album Son with piano and electric piano, as well as on his album Jeff Hanson with accordion, keyboards and piano. They divorced in 2008.

Hanson was found dead by his parents on June 5, 2009, in his St. Paul apartment, into which he had recently moved. The cause of death was mixed drug toxicity. The medical examiner's office was unable to determine whether the death was accidental or intentional. His brother Ryan explained in 2015 that “The medical examiner found nothing illegal in his system at all. All they found was his anti-depressants, his anti-anxiety medication, and he had been drinking . . . for whatever reason, the sun, the moon, and the stars all aligned in a particular way where it ended up becoming toxic. We went back and looked at the prescriptions that had been written, and you want to place some kind of blame—but you can’t.”

== Discography ==
- 1995 Chewed Smooth Center (as part of the band M.I.J.)
- 1996 300 Miles (7") (as part of the band M.I.J.)
- 1999 M.I.J. (EP) (as part of the band M.I.J.)
- 2000 Radio Goodnight (as part of the band M.I.J.)
- 2003 Devil in the Woods (EP) (Limited edition of 777 copies. Exclusive to Devil in the Woods Magazine issue 5.3.)
- 2003 Son
- 2005 Jeff Hanson
- 2008 Madam Owl
