= She Has No Strings Apollo =

Studio album by Dirty Three
- Released: February 2003
- Recorded: 2002
- Genre: Post-rock
- Length: 47:00
- Label: Touch and Go Records
- Producer: Dirty Three

Dirty Three chronology
In the Fishtank 7 (2001)	She Has No Strings Apollo (2003)	Cinder (2005)

Professional ratings
Aggregate scores
Source	Rating
Metacritic	79/100 link
Review scores
Source	Rating
Allmusic	link

She Has No Strings Apollo is the sixth major album by Australian trio, Dirty Three. It reached No. 4 on the ARIA Hitseekers Albums chart. Cover art by guitarist Mick Turner.

== Track listing ==
1. "Alice Wading" – 8:23
2. "She Has No Strings" – 8:40
3. "Long Way To Go With No Punch" – 4:56
4. "No Stranger Than That" – 7:11
5. "Sister Let Them Try and Follow" – 5:17
6. "She Lifted The Net" – 4:16
7. "Rude (And Then Some Slight Return)" – 8:31

== Bonus tracks ==
1. "She Apollo" – 4:11
2. "All Downhill From Here" – 6:28
