= Horse Stories =

Studio album by Dirty Three
- Released: 10 September 1996
- Recorded: 1996
- Studios: Maison Rouge Studios, London
- Genres: Post-rock, folk rock
- Length: 56:00
- Label: Touch and Go
- Producer: Dirty Three

Dirty Three chronology
Dirty Three (1995)	Horse Stories (1996)	Ocean Songs (1998)

Professional ratings
Review scores
Source	Rating
AllMusic	4.5/5 stars
Alternative Press	5/5
Entertainment Weekly	A
Los Angeles Times	3/4 stars
NME	7/10
Q	4/5 stars
Rolling Stone	4/5 stars
Uncut	4/5 stars

Horse Stories is the third studio album by Australian rock band Dirty Three, released on 10 September 1996 by Touch and Go Records. The album was recorded at Maison Rouge Studios, London. The cover art was designed by guitarist Mick Turner.

The track "I Remember a Time When Once You Used to Love Me" is a cover of the Greek song Mia phora thymamai, written by Giannis Spanos and originally sung by the singer-songwriter Arleta.

== Reception ==
Andrew McMillen of The Australian said, "This Melbourne instrumental trio was never more ferocious than on its third album, which captures the violin/drums/guitar combo alternately smouldering and at full conflagration, sometimes within the space of a single wordless song."

== Track listing ==
All tracks are written by Dirty Three, except where noted.

No.	Title	Writer(s)	Length
1.	"1000 Miles"		4:40
2.	"Sue's Last Ride"		7;22
3.	"Hope"		4:53
4.	"I Remember a Time When Once You Used to Love Me"	Giannis Spanos	6:11
5.	"At the Bar"		6:39
6.	"Red"		3:54
7.	"Warren's Lament"		8:44
8.	"Horse"		5:38
9.	"I Knew It Would Come to This"		8:38
Total length:			56:39
