= Essie Jain =

English singer-songwriter

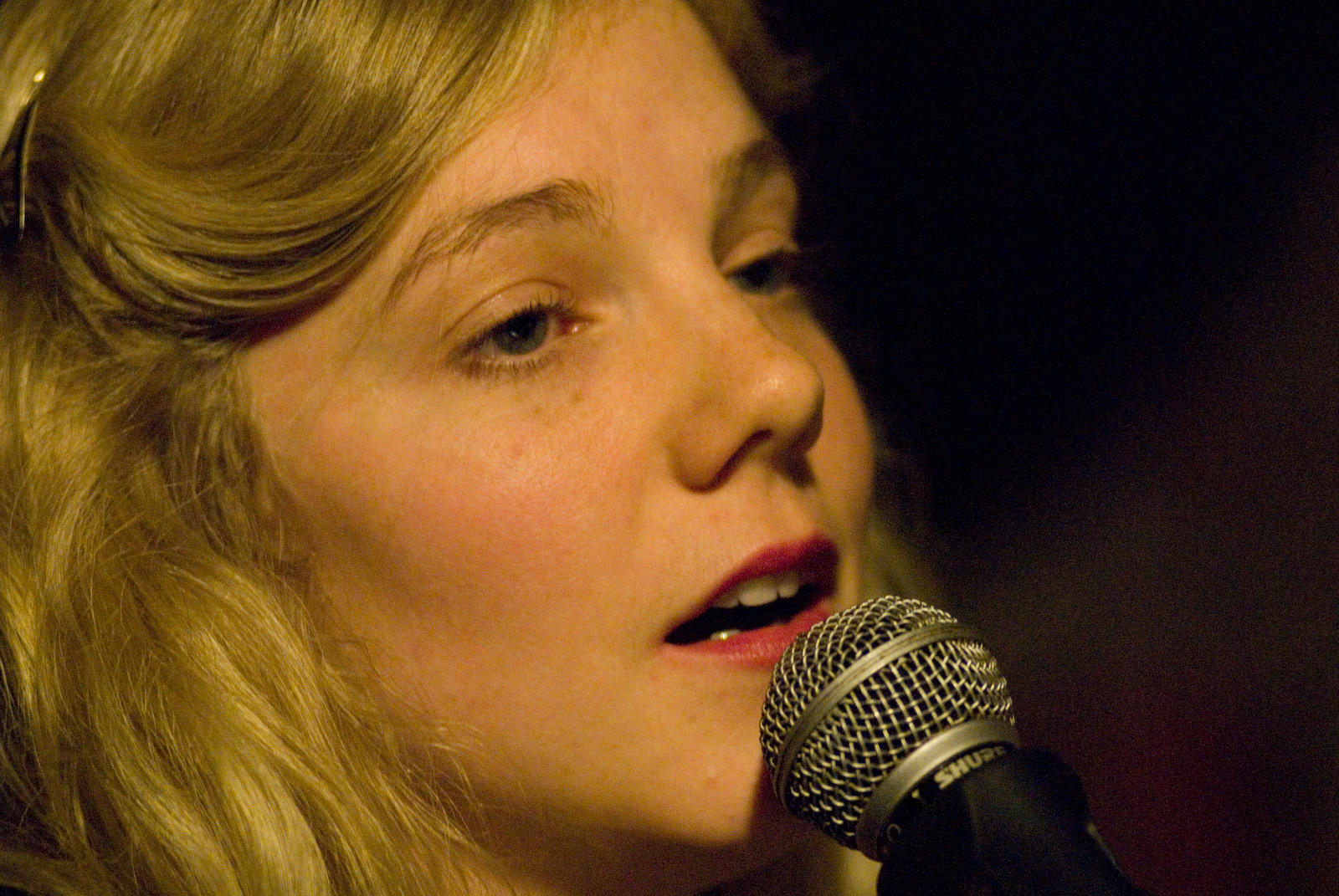
- Born: London, England
- Occupation: Singer-songwriter
- Website: www.essiejain.com

Essie Jain is an English singer and songwriter born and raised in London, who is now based in Los Angeles.

== Biography ==
Her first published work was a single track, "Why", on the album The Sound the Hare Heard, which contains a single track each from a large number of artists including Sufjan Stevens and Colin Meloy. This record was curated by Slim Moon and released by Kill Rock Stars.

Her first album, We Made This Ourselves, drew comparisons to the British folk singers Sandy Denny and Vashti Bunyan. This record was originally released in the United States on Ba Da Bing records and was later released in the rest of the world on The Leaf Label.

The New York Times wrote that "Ms. Jain builds stark miniatures out of a few light strums of guitar and her haunting alto. On her captivating new album, We Made This Ourselves, her voice is multitracked in precise harmonies that can be warm or ghostly."

Jain recorded a Daytrotter session that was released 7 April 2010.

In 2011, she started her own record label and released Until The Light Of Morning, an album of original lullabies for parent and child, written and recorded by Jain.

In 2013, Huffington Post announced the release of All Became Golden, her first audiovisual release, the result of a collaboration with filmmaker Natalie Johns and critically acclaimed composer/arranger Nico Muhly. Inspired by Frank Sinatra's recording process, a small audience was invited to witness these live orchestral recordings in the DiMenna Center for Classical Music in New York City, capturing a collaboration of Muhly and Jain, the recording process and Jain's deep connection to the music.

Jain practices meditation and channeling, which began to reveal itself as an influence on her work in 2015, when Jain released To Love, an album of modern chants and movements. In 2016, she began writing and recording the Musical Meditation Series with her husband and longterm collaborator Patrick Glynn, which was inspired by the improvisations of their live performances.

In 2018, Jain released the album As I Return, which explored songs created for the expression of voice, and were designed to be used as companions to therapeutic healing practices.

In 2020, she released two singles, “Hold Us” and a children's song “For Everyone” to mark the 10 year anniversary of her original lullaby album.

In 2022 she released the EP, “Let Us Be Seen” followed by a single “Moving Through”

In 2023 she released two songs for the death doula and hospice movements, made to support end of life care, “As we gathered together” and “We only felt love”

In June 2023 she announced she had begun writing and recording an album of folk songs with her husband Patrick Glynn. This album entitled “The Rose In Bloom” was released in March 2025.

== Discography ==
=== Multiple artist albums ===
- The Sound the Hare Heard (Kill Rock Stars, 9 April 2006) (one song from Jain, titled "Why")

=== Albums ===
- We Made This Ourselves (US release Ba Da Bing, 13 February 2007)
- We Made This Ourselves (worldwide release The Leaf Label, 31 March 2008)
- The Inbetween (worldwide release 2008)
- Until The Light of Morning (worldwide release 2011)
- All Became Golden (worldwide release 2013)
- To Love (worldwide release 2015)
- Musical Meditation Series (worldwide release 2016)
- As I Return (worldwide release 2018)
- The Rose In Bloom (worldwide release 2025)

=== Singles ===
- Hold Us (worldwide release 2020)
- For Everyone (worldwide release 2021)
- Moving Through (worldwide release 2022)

=== EP ===
- Let Us Be Seen (worldwide release 2022)
