= Whatever You Love, You Are =

Studio album by Dirty Three
- Released: March 2000
- Recorded: July 1999
- Genre: Post-rock
- Length: 48:17
- Label: Anchor & Hope; Glitterhouse; Bella Union; Touch and Go
- Producer: Dirty Three

Dirty Three chronology
Ocean Songs (1998)	Whatever You Love, You Are (2000)	In the Fishtank 7 (2001)

Whatever You Love, You Are is the fifth studio album by Australian trio Dirty Three, released in March 2000. It won the 2000 ARIA Music Award for Best Alternative Release. The cover art was by the band's guitarist, Mick Turner. Australian musicologist Ian McFarlane wrote that the album showed "deep, rich, emotional musical vistas" and likened the band's music to that of John Coltrane.

== Reception ==
Professional ratings
Review scores
Source	Rating
Allmusic	link
Pitchfork	8.9/10 link

== Track listing ==
1. "Some Summers They Drop Like Flys" – 6:20
2. "I Really Should've Gone Out Last Night" – 6:55
3. "I Offered It Up to the Stars & the Night Sky" – 13:41
4. "Some Things I Just Don't Want to Know" – 6:07
5. "Stellar" – 7:29
6. "Lullabye for Christie" – 7:45
