= We Made This Ourselves =

Studio album by Essie Jain
- Released: 20 December 2007
- Label: Ba Da Bing
- Producer: Essie Jain, Patrick Glynn

We Made This Ourselves is the first album by Essie Jain. The album was released by Ba Da Bing in 2007.

The New York Times wrote that "Ms. Jain builds stark miniatures out of a few light strums of guitar and her haunting alto. On her captivating new album, We Made This Ourselves, her voice is multitracked in precise harmonies that can be warm or ghostly."

== Track listing ==
All tracks composed by Essie Jain

1. "Glory"
2. "Haze"
3. "Sailor"
4. "Talking"
5. "Indefinable"
6. "Grace"
7. "Give"
8. "Understand"
9. "Loaded"
10. "No Mistake"
