= Dirty Three =

Australian instrumental rock band

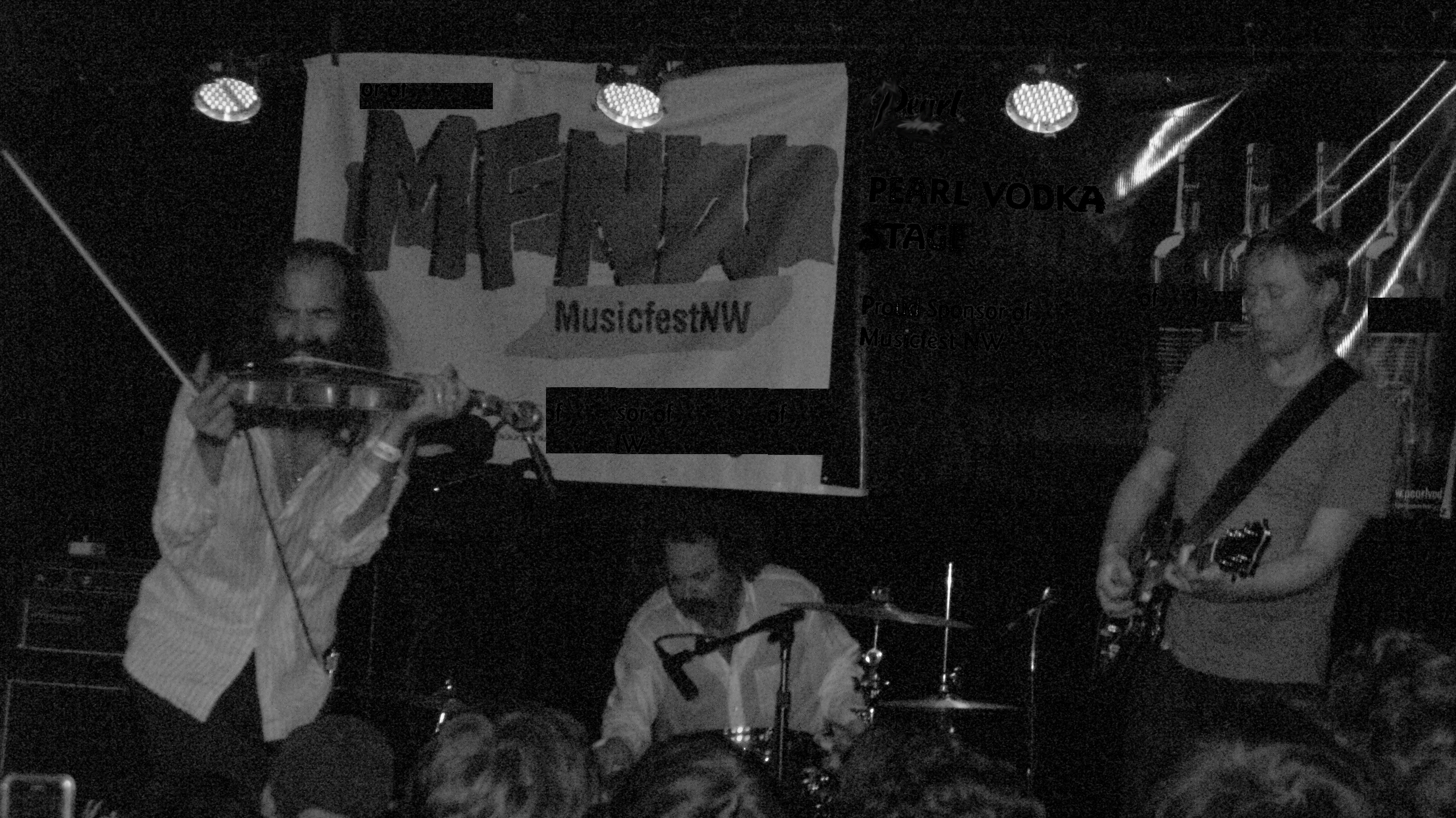
- Dirty Three performing at MusicfestNW in Portland, Oregon, September 2009

Background information
- Origin: Melbourne, Victoria, Australia
- Genres: Instrumental rock, post-rock
- Years active: 1992–present
- Labels: Torn & Frayed, Shock, Poon Village, Rough Trade, Drag City, Touch and Go, Bella Union, Anchor & Hope
- Members: Warren Ellis; Jim White; Mick Turner
- Website: dirtythree.com

Dirty Three are an Australian instrumental rock band, consisting of Warren Ellis (violin, keyboards), Mick Turner (electric guitar, organ and bass) and Jim White (drums), which formed in 1992. Their 1996 album Horse Stories was voted by Rolling Stone as one of the top three albums of the year. Two of their albums have peaked into the top 50 on the ARIA Albums Chart, Ocean Songs (1998) and Toward the Low Sun (2012). During their career they have spent much of their time overseas when not performing together. Turner is based in Melbourne, White lives in New York, and Ellis in Paris. Australian rock music historian Ian McFarlane described them as providing a "rumbling, dynamic sound incorporated open-ended, improvisational, electric rock ... minus the jazz-rock histrionics". In October 2010, Ocean Songs was listed in the book 100 Best Australian Albums.

== History ==
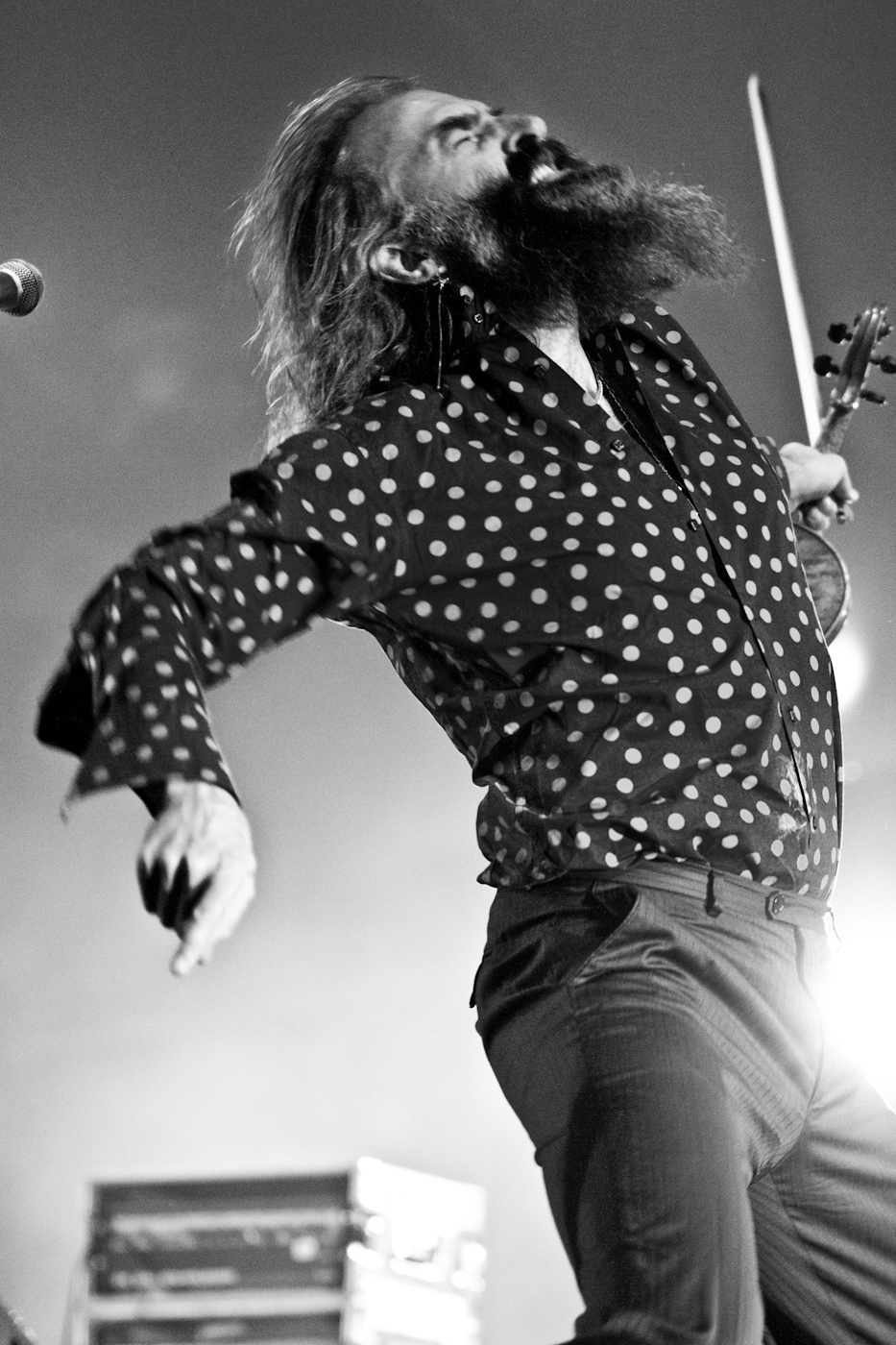
Warren Ellis of the Dirty Three at WOMADELAIDE 2012

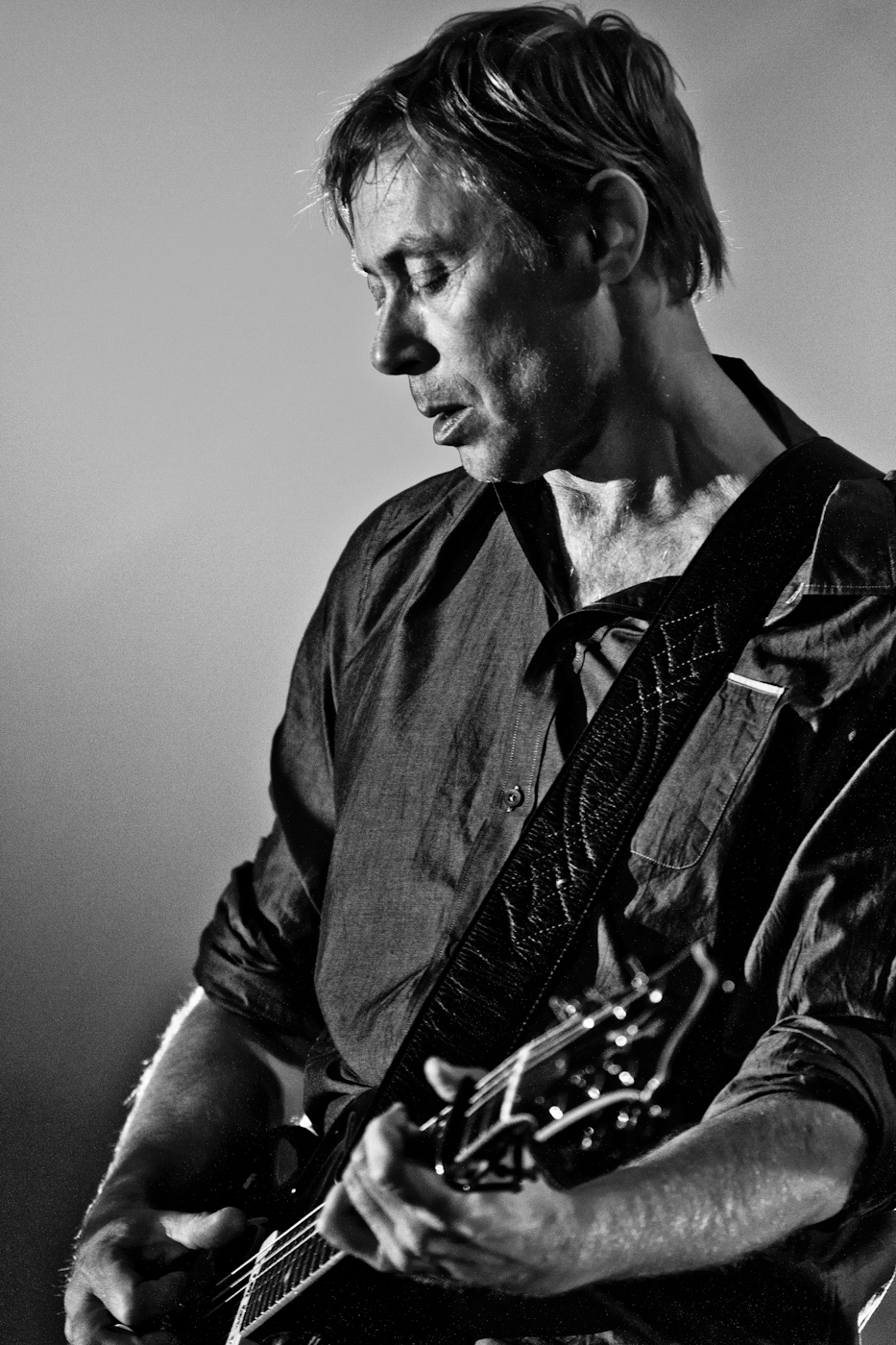
Mick Turner of the Dirty Three

Dirty Three formed as an instrumental rock trio in Melbourne in 1992 with Warren Ellis on violin and bass guitar (ex-These Future Kings in 1986), Mick Turner on lead and bass guitars (Sick Things, The Moodists, Venom P. Stinger, Fungus Brains), and Jim White on drums (People with Chairs Up Their Noses, Feral Dinosaurs, Venom P. Stinger). Prior to the formation of Dirty Three, Ellis studied classical violin, worked briefly as a school teacher in regional Victoria, then travelled as a busker in Europe. Ellis wrote music for theatre groups and plays before performing with Melbourne bands. Ellis was also a member of The Blackeyed Susans, Busload of Faith, Kim Salmon and the Surrealists and has been a member of Nick Cave and the Bad Seeds since 1994. Turner and White have a shared musical history via numerous common bands during the 1980s and early 1990s. Outside Dirty Three's activities, both have since contributed to other artists and groups. White's previous group Feral Dinosaurs also featured Conway Savage, also a member of Nick Cave and the Bad Seeds and The Blackeyed Susans. White also played on records by Hunters and Collectors and Tex, Don and Charlie.

On ANZAC Day (25 April) 1992, Dirty Three played their first gig—at the Baker's Arms Hotel, Richmond. At the trio's first live show, Ellis attached a guitar pick-up to his violin with a rubber band, providing the instrument with a distorted, feedback-drenched tone unlike the violin's more traditional sound. In 1992, they recorded a self-titled cassette of 12-tracks in Turner's bedroom (aka Scuzz Studio). Dirty Three played all over Melbourne's inner city in Abbotsford, then Fitzroy, Richmond and St. Kilda. In 1993 copies of the Dirty Three cassette were given away at their early gigs. During 1994 they were the support act for international groups Pavement, Beastie Boys and John Spencer Blues Explosion. In July that year, Torn & Frayed Records issued the band's eponymous album. According to Australian rock music historian Ian McFarlane, it was "[b]rimming with Ellis's alternately subtle and dramatic violin flourishes, Turner's tensile guitar lines and White's sympathetic drumming, [and] was a strong introduction to the band's atmospheric musical palate".

Dirty Three are my favourite live band. No contest ... I think it's because they don't have a singer ... There are three musicians working together, one no less important than the other and well, you can get lost in all that. Their music washes over you and you're away ... When I watch them, they ignite something, I start having grand plans and hundreds of lyrics leap into my head.

— Nick Cave quoted in 100 Best Australian Albums (2010).

In November 1994 their next album, Sad & Dangerous, was issued on the Poon Village label and included tracks from the trio's earlier cassette. The album, along with subsequent tours with Sonic Youth, John Cale, and Pavement, led to a record deal with Chicago's Touch and Go Records. In March 1995 the group started a United States tour with a gig in San Francisco. In May they performed at the Music West Festival in Vancouver, British Columbia, Canada. Subsequently, that year they toured the US four times, then toured Europe with gigs in Greece, Germany and the United Kingdom. They toured Israel with Nick Cave and the Bad Seeds, then back in London in August they performed with Cave – who was also a participant on the Palace project – providing a live soundtrack for the Carl Dreyer silent film The Passion of Joan of Arc, at the National Film Theatre.

They performed at the Big Day Out series of concerts in January 1996 – for the Melbourne show they were joined on stage by Cave. Later in 1996 they toured the US again; one of the shows was at Maxwell's, New Jersey. In September that year they issued their next album, Horse Stories, which was voted by Rolling Stone magazine as one of the top three albums of the year. In March 1998 the band issued Ocean Songs, which Billboard's Chris Morris felt was "an unexpected new direction" where "the sound is still brazenly live, the atmosphere is generally rapturous and lyrical, instead of explosive and febrile". The album peaked in the top 50 on the ARIA Albums Chart. In October 2010 Ocean Songs was listed in the book 100 Best Australian Albums. It was described as displaying "an Australian sound that had never been heard before, one that was aware of our vast landscape but was reared in the urban landscapes of our various inner-city underground scenes". In May 1998 they started a two-month US tour. The group provided five new tracks for the soundtrack of John Curran's debut feature film Praise (1998).

In March 2000 Dirty Three released another studio album, Whatever You Love, You Are which McFarlane found showed "deep, rich, emotional musical vistas, and furthered the band's connection to the music and approach of jazz great John Coltrane". In 2002, Dirty Three toured Taiwan together with US indie rocker Chan Marshall (aka Cat Power) and both artists returned in 2004. Also in 2004, they gigged at the Meredith Music Festival where a rain storm threatened their set, Ellis later remembered "we just went out and played like our lives depended on it ... and you all went for it; otherwise it just fell to pieces". In late 2005, Dirty Three released their seventh major album, Cinder. Although following in the spirit of Ocean Songs, it diverges from their previous works: it was their first album to feature vocals (from Marshall and from Sally Timms of The Mekons), albeit on two of nineteen tracks. Its tracks are generally shorter and more concise; and instead of their usual live-in-the-studio technique they recorded each member's work individually.

In 2006 they toured Malaysia, Hong Kong, China and Taiwan. In May 2007 the band curated a weekend of the All Tomorrow's Parties festival, booking bands they admired in addition to performing twice themselves. In November they issued a two-disc DVD set, The Dirty Three; the first disc shows a live concert from Tokyo, Japan, shot in HD by Taiyo Films, and the second disc contains various live performances from 1994 to 2006, a documentary and interviews. Film director Darcy Maine completed the documentary on the band's history. In February 2012 the group released Toward the Low Sun, and in March, they performed at the Sydney Opera House. The album peaked in the top 40 on the ARIA Albums Chart and appeared in the top 50 on Billboard's Top Heatseekers Chart.

In 2024, the group released their ninth studio album, Love Changes Everything, and undertook a tour of Australia, their first live performances since 2019 and first major tour since 2012.

In 2025, the group announced both a European tour for November and December of that year, and North America in March and April 2026.

== Collaborations ==
Since 1996 Dirty Three's violinist Warren Ellis has been a member of Nick Cave and the Bad Seeds. Ellis and Mick Turner have each released solo albums. In addition, Turner and Jim White have released several extended plays as The Tren Brothers, and appear as backing musicians on albums by Cat Power, Bonnie 'Prince' Billy and PJ Harvey (White drums). Turner is also an internationally exhibited painter with his own work gracing the covers of their major albums except Sad & Dangerous. He also runs the band's own record label, Anchor & Hope Records. In 1999, Dirty Three with Low, recorded an In the Fishtank session for Konkurrent Records.

Dirty Three have released albums on Touch & Go Records and have toured with Nick Cave, Sonic Youth, Low, Pavement, Throwing Muses, Cat Power, PJ Harvey, Bonnie 'Prince' Billy, Devendra Banhart, Josh T. Pearson, Shannon Wright and The Pogues. During their career the group have spent much of their time overseas, when not performing together Turner is based in Melbourne, White lives in New York, and Ellis in Paris.

== Musical style ==
Australian rock music historian Ian McFarlane compared the band to 1970s jazz rockers MacKenzie Theory, writing that the group's "rumbling, dynamic sound incorporated open-ended, improvisational, electric rock ... minus the jazz-rock histrionics". In describing the group's sound, music journalists have mentioned ballads, folk, rock, classical, chamber music, free jazz and blues, Celtic music, other European folk styles and Indian raga.

== Discography ==
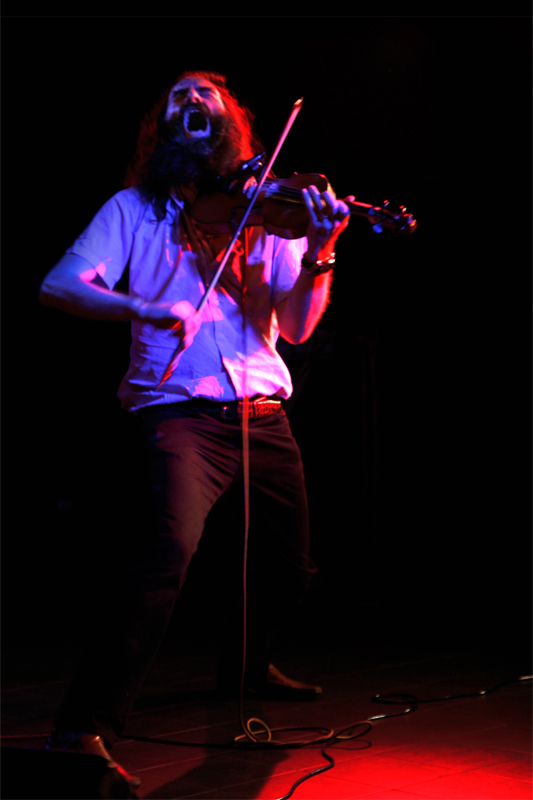
Warren Ellis performing with Dirty Three, Milan, May 2007

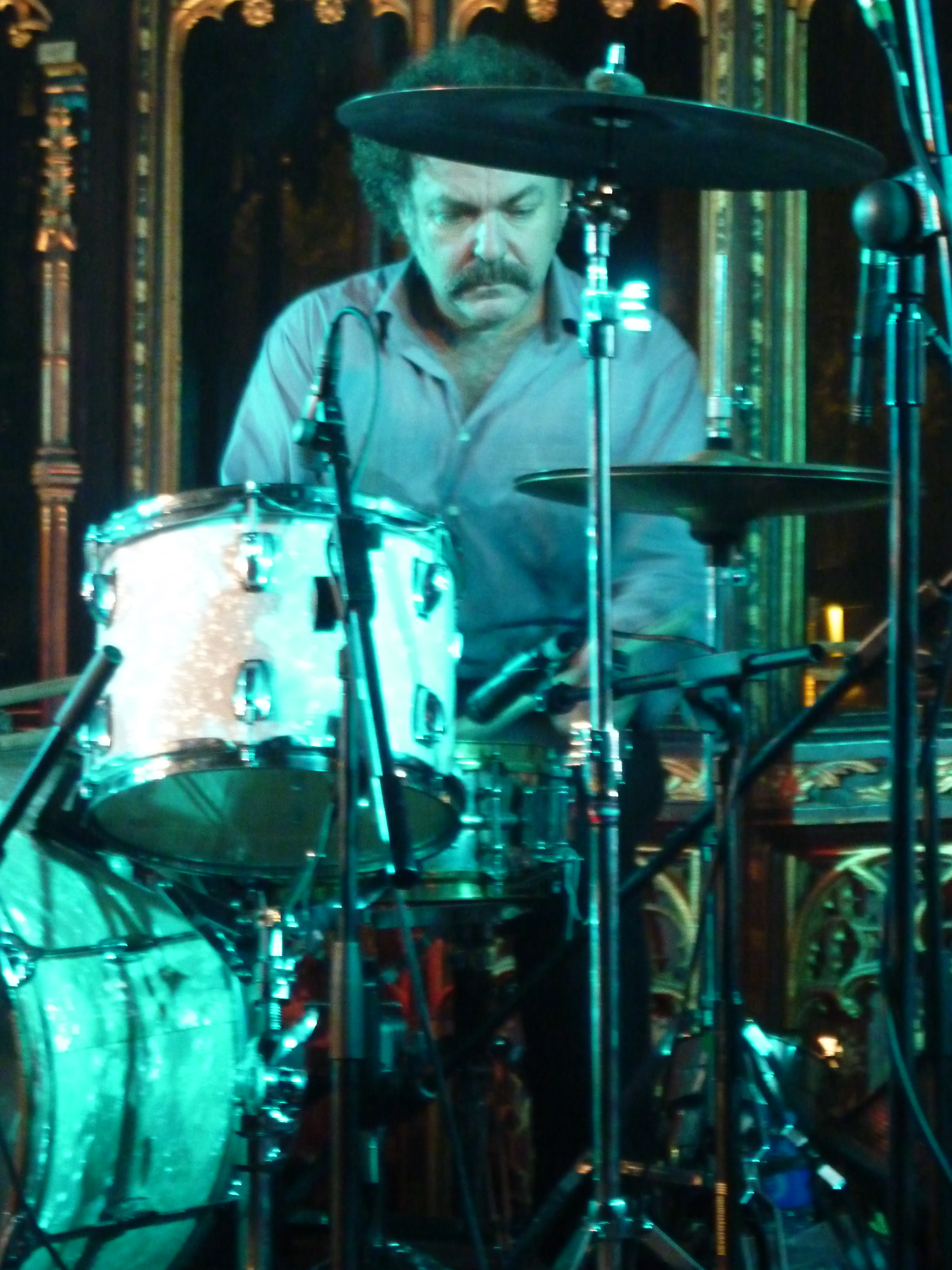
Jim White performing with Dirty Three, Manchester Cathedral, November 2012

According to various sources:

=== Studio albums ===
List of albums, with selected chart positions
Title	Album details	Peak chart positions
Title	Album details	AUS
Dirty Three	Released: 1993; Label: Scuzz Productions (Scuzz 001); Format: Cassette	—
Dirty Three	Released: June 1994; Label: Torn & Frayed (TORNCD6); Format: CD	—
Sad & Dangerous	Released: 1995; Label: Torn & Frayed (TORNCD10); Format: CD	—
Horse Stories	Released: 1996; Label: Anchor & Hope (AH001CD); Format: CD, 2×LP	—
Ocean Songs	Released: April 1998; Label: Anchor & Hope (AH003CD); Format: CD, 2×LP	44
Lowlands	Released: 2000; Label: Anchor & Hope; Format: CD	—
Whatever You Love, You Are	Released: March 2000; Label: Anchor & Hope (AH006CD); Format: CD, LP	73
She Has No Strings Apollo	Released: 2003; Label: Anchor & Hope (AH008CD); Format: CD, LP	—
Cinder	Released: 2005; Label: Anchor & Hope (AH009CD); Format: CD, LP	—
Toward the Low Sun	Released: 2012; Label: Anchor & Hope (AH0010CD); Format: CD, LP, digital	31
Love Changes Everything	Released: June 2024; Label: Anchor & Hope; Format: CD, LP, digital	12

=== Live albums ===
List of live albums, with selected chart positions
Title	Album details
Live! At Meredith	Released: 2005; Label: Anchor & Hope; Format: CD; Recorded live at Meredith Music Festival in Victoria, 11 December 2004
Dirty Three Live at Sydney Festival	Released: April 2016; Label: Anchor & Hope; Format: Digital; Recorded live in Sydney 2016

=== Video albums ===
List of video albums
Title	Album details
The Dirty Three	Released: 2007; Label: Madman (MMA2660); Format: 2× DVD

== Extended plays ==
List of Extended Plays
Title	Details
Sharks	Released: 1998; Label: Anchor & Hope (AHX01S); Format: CD
Ufkuko	Released: 1998 (UK); Label: Bella Union (BELLACD6); Format: CD
In the Fishtank 7 (with Low)	Released: 2001; Label: Anchor & Hope – AH007CD; Format: CD

== Awards and nominations ==
=== ARIA Awards ===
The ARIA Music Awards are presented annually from 1987 by the Australian Recording Industry Association (ARIA). Dirty Three have won one award from four nominations.

Year	Nominee / work	Award	Result	Ref.
1997	Horse Stories	Best Independent Release	Nominated	
1997	Horse Stories	Best Adult Alternative Album	Nominated	
1998	Ocean Songs	Best Adult Alternative Album	Nominated	
2000	Whatever You Love, You Are	Best Adult Alternative Album	Won	
2024	Dirty Three - Love Changes Everything Tour	ARIA Award for Best Australian Live Act	Pending	

=== Australian Music Prize ===
The Australian Music Prize (the AMP) is an annual award of $50,000 given to an Australian band or solo artist in recognition of the merit of an album released during the year of award. They commenced in 2005.

Year	Nominee / work	Award	Result	Ref.
2024	Love Changes Everything	Australian Music Prize	Nominated	

=== EG Awards ===
The EG Awards are an annual awards night celebrating Victorian music. They commenced in 2006.

Year	Nominee / work	Award	Result
2012	Toward the Low Sun	Best Album	Nominated
2012	themselves	Best Band	Nominated
