= Mick Turner =

Australian musician

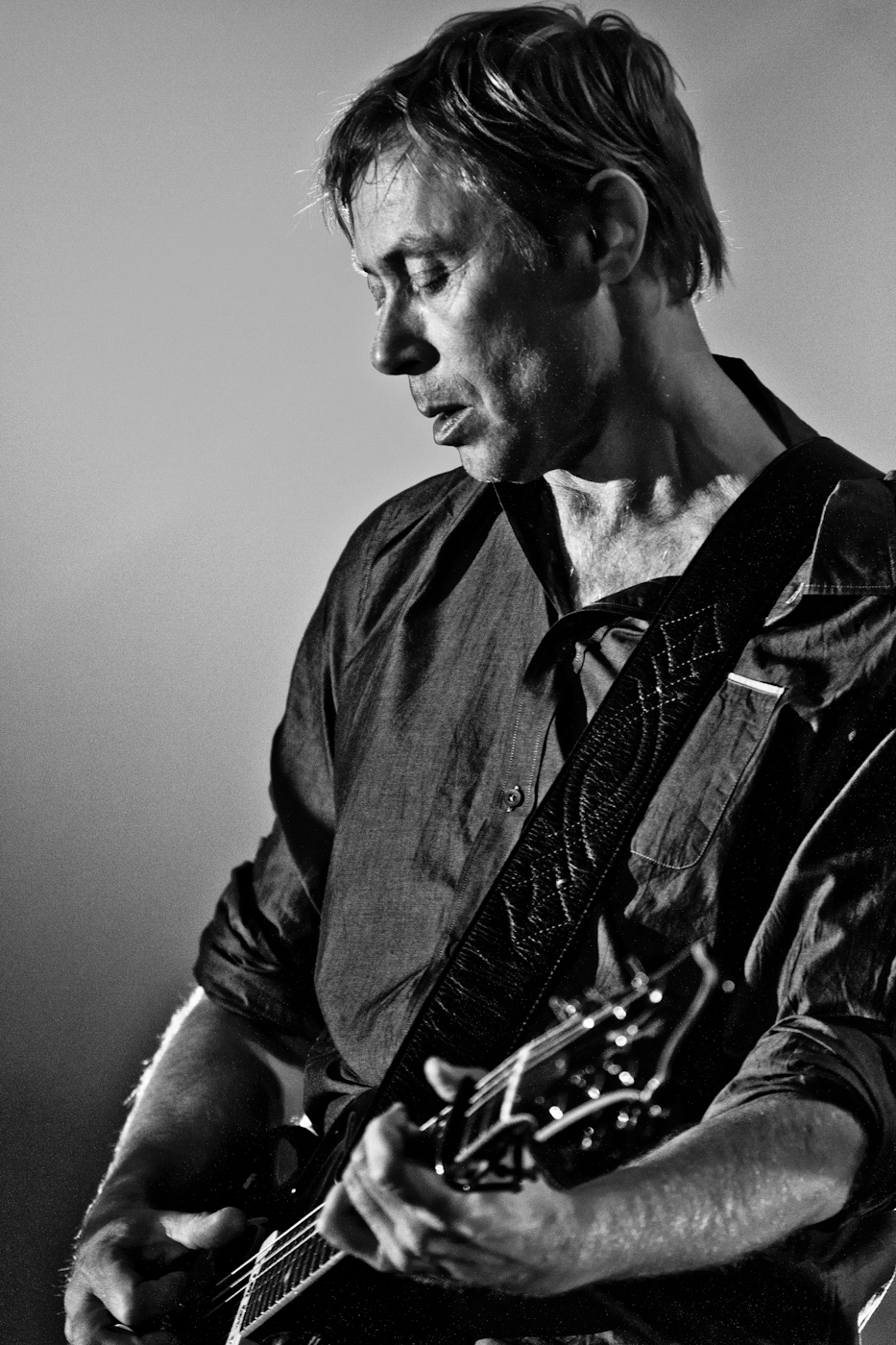

Background information
- Born: 1960 (age 65–66); Melbourne, Victoria, Australia
- Genres: Instrumental rock
- Occupations: Musician, artist, record producer
- Instruments: Guitar, bass
- Years active: 1979–present
- Labels: Drag City, Spunk, Fiido, Festival, Anchor and Hope, King Crab
- Website: mickturner.com

Mick Turner (born 1960) is an Australian musician and artist. He is the founding mainstay guitarist for Dirty Three and has had art exhibitions around Australia and internationally. Previously he was a member of the Sick Things, the Moodists (1983–84) and Venom P. Stinger. He has released four solo studio albums, Tren Phantasma (1997), Marlan Rosa (1999), Moth (2003) and Don't tell the Driver (2013).

== Biography ==
Turner, grew up in Black Rock, Victoria. In 1979, Turner (as Mick Sick), on guitar, formed Sick Things in Melbourne alongside Gary Hirst (as Gary Sick) on drums, Dugald Mackenzie (as Dugald Bluuuugh) on vocals and Geoff Martyr (as Geoff Sick) on bass guitar.

Tim Peacock of Record Collector magazine opined that the group were "Arguably the city's [i.e. Melbourne's] rawest hardcore outfit". They recorded a single, "Committed to Suicide" (1985) before Turner and Mackenzie left in 1982. It also appeared on their posthumous album, The Sounds of Silence on Shock Records (1989). Australian musicologist, Ian McFarlane, has written that "the records featured ferocious guitar riffs and distorted vocals, displaying the band's penchant for flat-out, Black Flag-style hardcore punk."

In 1982 Turner formed Fungus Brains as a proto-grunge and punk rock group with Simon Adams on bass guitar, Peter Maddick on trumpet, Geoff Marks on vocals and saxophone, Simon Sleigh on guitar and drums, and Andrew Walpole on drums and guitar. Their debut album, Ron Pistos Real World, was released in 1983. McFarlane described it as "a stylistic collision of punk, Birthday Party trappings, avant no-wave jazzy noise and a dozen other reference points." That group went into hiatus when Turner joined the Moodists, in April 1983.

The Moodists were a rock group which had formed in 1980, with Turner aboard the line-up was Dave Graney on lead vocals, Steve Miller on guitar, Clare Moore on drums and Chris Walsh on bass guitar. McFarlane writes that Turner was "adding his squalling guitar work to the band's unnerving, avant-garage rock noise." In October 1983, as a member of the Moodists, Turner relocated to London. They issued their debut studio album, Thirsty's Calling, in April 1984. The Moodists toured Europe and the United States before returning to Australia in November that year. They supported the Australian leg of a tour by UK group, Public Image Ltd, after which Turner left to reconvene Fungus Brains.

Fungus Brains released a self-titled album in 1986. Turner was also playing with Venom P. Stinger in 1985 alongside former Sick Things bandmate Mackenzie on lead vocals, Alan Secher-Jensen (who had played in Brainshack with Mackenzie, as well as Beachnuts) on bass guitar and Jim White on drums (ex-People with Chairs Up Their Noses, Feral Dinosaurs). McFarlane explained that the group "took the experimental avant-garde route to its logical conclusion with an unnerving sound that thrived on raw energy, a complex rhythmic base and unconventional song structures."

Their debut album, Meet My Friend Venom, was issued in January 1987, which contained "clattering slices of avant-rock with absolutely no concession to commercial gains." Marc Masters of Pitchfork felt it is "a marvel of primal thrust, tearing through the air so forcefully you often feel like you're just catching its smoke trails." The album was followed by a single, "Walking About", in July 1988.

By 1989 Fungus Brains were reactivated with Turner and Walpole joined by Paula Henderson on saxophone (ex-White Cross), Ricky Howell on lead vocals and Peter Villiger on bass guitar. This line-up issued another album, I'm So Glad, in 1990 before Turner returned to Venom P. Stinger. That group released their second album, What's Yours is Mine, in October 1990. They followed with a four-track extended play, Waiting Room in November 1991. Venom P. Stinger toured the US and recorded a live album, Live (in Davis) (1982) in Davis, California.

Early in 1992, back in Melbourne, Turner, on lead and bass guitar, and White, on drums, formed an instrumental trio, Dirty Three, with Warren Ellis on violin and bass guitar (ex-These Future Kings in 1986). Their first performance was at the Baker's Arms hotel in Abbotsford in April 1992. During late 1992 to early the following year Turner's living room was used as a recording studio, Scuzz Studio, for the group's first cassette album. Eight of its twelve tracks were produced and engineered by Turner, with the other four tracks by Julian Wu. Turner runs Dirty Three's record label, Anchor & Hope Records and has provided the cover art for all of their major albums after the first. Since 2003 Turner has had his artwork displayed in galleries in Australia, UK, US, Italy and Ireland.

Outside of his work for Dirty Three, Turner issued his debut solo album, Tren Phantasma, on US label, Drag City, in September 1997. Prior to that Venom P. Stinger had issued their final album, Tear Bucket, in 1996. Turner with White formed an instrumental rock duo, the Tren Brothers, in 1998, which released singles and extended plays. The Tren Brothers were also the backing band for Cat Power, Boxhead Ensemble and Bonnie 'Prince' Billy.

Turner's second solo studio album, Marlan Rosa, was issued in 1999. Jessica Billey supplied violins. McFarlane declared that it was " a rough-hewn album of 15 instrumentals with scratchy guitar and mysterious atmospherics." Alex Nosek of Oz Music Project described its "fifteen semi-improvised bundles of gentle aural bliss. Aside from the guitar, countless other noise making devices have been used. In fact, it is Turners' knack for looping and/or arranging the most delicious of fragile and sometimes unorthodox sound that gives this recording such an amazing feel."

Ed Nimmervoll, an Australian rock music journalist, compared his solo effort with his work for the trio "In Dirty Three, alongside the lashings of storm, there's also moody calm. That's Mick Turner's part in the equation. If music is a sea, Dirty Three is the waves crashing against the rocks in a strong wind. Mick Turner's solo music is the water breaking against the rocks, swirling around restlessly trying to find calm, before being thrown back into turbulance by another onslaught."

Turner has also released two albums with Billey under the moniker, Bonnevill, Travels in Constants, Vol. 2 (1999) and Pelican (2001). As well as a single, "Swing Pts. 1&2" (2000), credited to Tren Brothers & Sister which comprises Turner, White and Billey. When Turner performs his solo work, he is accompanied by one of several Melbourne drummers including Ian Wadley (of Bird Blobs), or Marty Brown (from Art of Fighting).

Turner's third solo album, Moth (2002), was described by Pitchfork's William Bowers as Turner "strikes chords with a kind of rolling, prophetic brush. He plucks strings as if he's confidently repairing or cleaning them with nervous tools. Yet there's something 'organic' about his leapfrogging tranquilly up the fretboard's stream. His arpeggios sound like they're stumbling home from ex-lovers' porches. Middle Eastern influences are detectable, but clouded with purposeful imprecisions. Here and there the songs seem composed, but Turner's apparently reading from Polaroids instead of sheet music. The pieces' only flaw is that they're often abbreviated, as if Turner fliply stopped the tape."

In November 2013 Turner played at the All Tomorrow's Parties festival in Camber Sands, England. His fourth solo album Don't tell the Driver (2013), has guest performances from Caroline Kennedy-McCracken and Oliver Mann. Thom Jurek of AllMusic compared it to his previous work, "retains his singular guitar style – an elliptical meld of implied melody gradually coaxed from fingerpicked chords and restrained strummed strings – all told, it's unlike anything he's done before."

In 2020 Turner formed Mess Esque with Helen Franzmann on vocals. Mess Esque have released three albums. In 2021 they released "Dream #12" on Bedroom Suck Records' Private Eyes series and self titled "Mess Esque" on Milk! records in Australia and Drag City Records for rest of the world. In 2025 they released Jay Marie, Comfort Me on Forgotten Song and Drag City.

In 2025 Turner formed Bleak Squad with Adalita, Mick Harvey and Marty Brown. Their debut album, Strange Love, was released in August 2025.

Turner is a member of Melbourne-based band, Fancy Weapon, with Claire Birchall, Joel Silbersher and Guy Maddison. Their debut single, Squid, was released in March 2026.

== Discography ==
=== Albums ===
The Sick Things

- The Sounds of Silence (recorded 1980–81, Shock Records, 1989)
- My Life Is a Mess (recorded 1980–81, May 1999)

The Fungus Brains

- Ron Pisto's Real World (Dr. Jim's Records, 1983)
- The Fungus Brains (Crash Records, 1986)
- I'm So Glad (Magnetic Records, 1989)

The Moodists

- Thirsty's Calling (Red Flame Records, April 1984)
- Double Life (Red Flame Records, 1985) (UK only)

Venom P. Stinger

- Meet My Friend Venom (No Masters Voice, January 1987)
- Whats Yours Is Mine (Aberrant/Normal Records, October 1990)
- Live (in Davis), (live album, Anopheles Records, 1992)
- Tearbucketer (Siltbreeze/Matador Records, 1996) (US release, import to Australia)

Solo

- Tren Phantasma, (Drag City, September 1997)
- Marlan Rosa, (Drag City, 1999)
- Moth (Drag City, 2002)
- Don't Tell the Driver (Drag City, 2013)

Bonnevill

- Travels in Constants, Vol. 2 (Temporary Residence Records, 1999)
- Pelican (Bella Union, 2001)

The Marquis de Tren and Bonny Billy

- Get the Fuck on Jolly Live (live album, Palace Records, 2001)
- Get on jolly (Palace Records, 1999)
- Solemns (Drag City, 2013)

Mess Esque

- Dream#12 Bedroom Suck Records Private Eye Series
- Mess Esque (Drag City, 2021)
- Jay Marie, Comfort Me (Drag City, 2025)

Bleak Squad

- Strange Love (Poison City Records, 2025)

=== Compilation albums ===
solo/The Tren Brothers

- Blue Trees (Drag City, 2007)

Venom P. Stinger

- Venom P. Stinger, 1986-1991 (2×CD, Drag City, 2013)

=== Extended plays ===
The Moodists

- Double Life (November 1984)

Venom P. Stinger

- Waiting Room (Au Go Go Records, November 1991)

Solo

- Seven Angels (Purposeful Availment) (Three Lobed Recordings, 2002)

The Marquis de Tren and Bonny Billy

- Get on Jolly (Palace Records, 2000, Palace records PR24)
- Solemns (Drag City, 2013, Drag City/Palace Records DC549 /PR55)

=== Singles ===
The Sick Things

- "Committed to Suicide" (1985)

The Moodists

- "Runaway" (April 1984)
- "Enough Legs to Live On" (October 1984)

Venom P. Stinger

- "Walking About" / "26 mgs" (Aberrant Records, July 1988)
- "Thickskin" / "Tearbucketer" (Death Valley Records, August 1994)

=== Ensemble and supporting musician ===
- Will Oldham – Western Music, (album), (Drag City, 1997)
- Palace Music – Lost Blues and Other Songs, (album), (Drag City, 1997)
- Bonnie 'Prince' Billie – Black Dissimulation/No Such As What I Want 7", (single) (All City Nomad, 1998)
- Cat Power – Moon Pix, (album) (Matador Records, 1998)
- Boxhead Ensemble – The Last Place to Go, (soundtrack album), (Atavistic/Secretly Canadian, 1998)
- Will Oldham – Guarapero/Lost Blues 2, (compilation), (Drag City, 2000)
- Boxhead Ensemble – Two Brothers, (album), (Atavistic, 2001)
- The Proposition (Original Soundtrack) (2006)
- Courtney Barnett & Kurt Vile - Lotta Sea Lice, (album) (Matador Records, 2017)
- Eleanor Jawurlngali - Eleanor Jawurlngali (2024)
