= Cropped Out =

Annual music festival

- Genre: Music festival
- Frequency: Annual
- Location: Louisville, Kentucky
- Years active: 2010–2014, 2016–2018
- Inaugurated: October 1–3, 2010
- Website: croppedoutmusic.com

Cropped Out is an annual multi-venue music festival held in Louisville, Kentucky, co-founded in 2010 by Ryan Davis and James Ardery. According to the festival's website, "Cropped Out aims to celebrate a select fistful of contemporary musicians, artists, and artisans whom we feel reflect a greater undercurrent of sonic, visual, and conceptual exploration. It is our intention to turn heads toward the talents of those often omitted, overlooked, or cropped out of 'the big picture'. These are the minds most interesting to us, the minds most capable of emerging from and quickly returning to their lightlessness, if only to be briefly met by a niche appreciation...The fest is designed to highlight the creative efforts of Louisville natives, friends, family, and fellow thinkers from Nashville to Chicago to Brooklyn and beyond." The festival stays true to this ethos, presenting independent bands and a general DIY scene in an intimate, affordable setting. The primary genres featured in the festival are Indie rock and post-punk, but expands into other genres such as folk, avant-garde, free jazz, hardcore punk, noise rock and even hip-hop and alternative country. Cropped Out has close ties with Drag City Records, Thrill Jockey Records, Sophomore Lounge among other independent labels.

The inaugural festival was held in October 2010 both at Kingfish and American Turners Louisville, both located on the banks of the Ohio River just east of downtown Louisville. During the first year, the festival was staffed primarily by the two organizers and their parents, along with a group of close friends. The second year of the festival was held at a warehouse space in the NuLu which was nicknamed "The Crummy Den" by festival organizers. Due to noise complaints on the final night of the festival, the Louisville Police Department interrupted and cut Scratch Acid's set short.

Since 2012, the main part of the festival has taken place at American Turners Louisville, often with Thursday opening and Sunday closing parties held at different local bars and venues. Since 2013, on-site camping has been available to ticket holders for a camping fee. Since 2016, Cropped Out has partnered with Against the Grain Brewery in Louisville to produce Hopped Out, the official beer of Cropped Out. Notably, on the emphasis of local artists, Cropped Out has hosted rare performances by Louisville bands and musicians such as Papa M, The Endtables, Bonnie 'Prince' Billy (performing Superwolf with Matt Sweeney), The Belgian Waffles! and more.

== Cropped Out lineups by year ==
=== Cropped Out VIII ===
The 2018 edition of Cropped Out took place October 5 and 6 at American Turners Louisville.

Friday, October 5

- Bill Direen
- Bill Mackay / Nathan Bowles
- Charalambides
- Circuit Des Yeux
- Drunks With Guns
- Exek
- Exit III
- Honey
- Iron Bars
- Leggy
- Major Stars
- Michael Hurley
- Night Vapor
- Simon Joyner
- Spider Bags
- Taiwan Housing Project
- The Sal Show
- Träd, Gräs & Stenar

Saturday, October 6

- Anthony Braxton / Jacqueline Kerrod
- Catherine Irwin
- Cherry Death
- Endless Boogie
- Equipment Pointed Ankh
- Footings
- Graham Lambkin / Bill Nace
- Half Japanese
- Jana Rush
- Kal Marks
- Lié
- Protruders
- Quin Kirchner Group
- Sadie
- Sex Tide
- Shabazz Palaces
- Thee Open Sex
- The Possum
- The Web
- The World
- Tommy Wright III
- Winger Brothers

=== Cropped Out VII ===
The 2017 edition of Cropped Out took place September 22 & 23, 2017 at American Turners Louisville. A kick-off party is scheduled to take place September 21, 2017 at Nachbar, and a closing party is scheduled to take place September 24, 2017 at Kaiju.

Thursday, September 21 @ Nachbar

- Fever Hands
- King Cheetah
- Shawnthany Calypso

Friday, September 22 @ American Turners

- 75 Dollar Bill
- Axis: Sova
- Bathroom Laws
- Circle X
- Crazy Doberman
- Dan Melchior
- Exacta Cube
- Heavy Dreams
- John Bender
- Limes
- Lung
- Neil Hamburger
- Pile
- Royal Trux
- The Cowboys
- The Stranger
- Tommy Jay's Latest Freak Show
- Wombo

Saturday, September 23 @ American Turners

- Attic Talent
- Billington / Shippy / Wyche
- David Nance
- Deep State
- Feedtime
- Frank Hurricane
- Fried Egg
- Le Fruit Vert
- Magik Markers
- Matt Jencik
- Peter Brötzmann
- Rays
- Sadat X
- Sarah Squirm
- Shit and Shine
- Shutaro Noguchi
- Tara Jane O'Neil
- Tashi Dorji & Tyler Damon
- The Other Years
- Tyvek

Sunday, September 24 @ American Turners

- Axel Cooper
- Jaye Jayle
- Justin Frye of PC Worship
- Mike Donovan of Peacers / Sic Alps
- Natural Man

=== Cropped Out VI ===
The 2016 edition of Cropped Out took place on September 23 & 24, 2016 at American Turners after a year-long hiatus, due largely to both Tropical Trash and State Champion (two bands that are composed mainly of the festival's organizers and staff) going on tours around the same time that year. The kick-off party took place at Nachbar in Louisville on September 22, and the closing party took place at Kaiju on September 25.

Thursday, September 22 @ Nachbar (Kickoff Party)

- Quailbones
- Smut
- Wombo

Friday, September 23 @ American Turners

- Bitchin' Bajas and Bonnie "Prince" Billy
- John Bellows
- Dead C
- Fred and Toody Cole (Dead Moon)
- Cherry Blossoms
- Joe McPhee and Susan Alcorn
- Quilt Boy
- Shawn D. McMillen Band
- Joan Shelley
- Giving Up
- Beat Awfuls
- Aaron Rosenblum
- Cereal Glyphs
- Paper Claw
- Pleasure Boys
- Dry Summers
- Long Thanh Nguyen

Saturday, September 24 @ American Turner's

- Spray Paint
- Thomas Jefferson Slave Apartments (Reunion)
- Pissed Jeans
- Lumpy and The Dumpers
- Home Blitz
- Kool Keith
- Black Panties
- Brett Naucke
- Bill Callahan
- Louie Louie
- Power
- Bugg
- Hidden Ritual
- Matchess
- Laffing Gas
- Ancient Filth
- Creeping Pink
- Insect Policy
- The Felchers
- Opposite Sex
- Vern

Sunday, September 25 @ Kaiju

- Thee Open Sex
- Hearts and Minds
- Tropical Trash
- Spray Paint

=== Cropped Out V ===
The 2014 edition took place from September 26 to September 28, 2014, at Dreamland Film Center, American Turners Louisville, and Fresh Start.

Thursday, September 25 @ Dreamland Film Center (Kickoff Party)

- Life Stinks
- Dream Eye Color Wheel
- The Sal Show

Friday, September 26 @ American Turners

- Apache Dropout
- Ausmuteants
- Axis: Sova
- Belgian Waffles! (Reunion set)
- Counter Intuits
- Elsinores
- Flanger Magazine
- Marriage
- Ma Turner
- Obnox
- Spray Paint
- The Rebel
- The Urinals
- Three Legged Race
- Total Abuse
- Vaderbomb

Saturday, September 27 @ American Turners

- Animal City (last minute addition)
- Anwar Sadat
- Bodycocktail
- Dan'l Boone (Featuring members of Royal Trux, Wolf Eyes The Howling Hex, etc.)
- JP5
- Little Gold
- Mail The Horse
- Michael Chapman
- Nathan Salsburg
- Pile
- Public Housing
- Sapat
- Shit and Shine
- Shutaro Noguchi
- Spider Bags
- Sun Ra Arkestra
- Tiger Hatchery
- Yonatan Gat

Sunday, September 28 @ Fresh Start Grower Supply

- Protomartyr
- White Reaper
- Tropical Trash
- Wishgift

=== Cropped Out IV ===
The 2013 edition of Cropped Out took place entirely at American Turners from Friday, September 27 to Sunday, September 29, 2013.

Friday, September 27 @ American Turners

- Endless Boogie
- The Endtables (Reunion; First show in Louisville, KY in over 30 years.)
- Bill Orcutt & Chris Corsano
- Hair Police
- Steve Gunn
- Blues Control
- Shit & Shine
- Watery Love
- Juanita
- Spray Paint
- Spelling Bee
- Promised Land
- Tweens
- Salad Influence
- White Reaper

Saturday, September 28 @ American Turners

- Bonnie 'Prince' Billy & Matt Sweeney (Performing Superwolf in its entirety.)
- Mayo Thompson (Performing Corky's Debt to His Father in its entirety.)
- Wolf Eyes
- Borbetomagus
- Cave
- Human Eye
- Connections
- Thee Open Sex
- Montag
- Running
- Jaye Jayle
- Kal Marks
- SKIMASK
- New England Patriots
- Today's Hits
- Tom Blacklung
- Quailbones
- Asm A Tik
- Rinehart
- Neighbor
- Mote

Sunday, September 29 @ American Turners

- Freakwater
- Lambchop

The Sunday show was originally intended to be held at the Workhouse Ballroom but was moved to the Phreedom Hall stage at American Turners. Tony Clifton was also scheduled to perform as the host for the main part of the festival at American Turners but ultimately cancelled for personal reasons.

=== Cropped Out III ===
The 2012 edition took place at American Turners and the Workhouse Ballroom, a small cave near the Highlands area of Louisville, from Friday, September 28 to Sunday, September 30, 2012.

Friday, September 28 @ American Turners

- Buck Gooter
- Chain and The Gang
- Disco Doom
- Eugene Chadbourne
- Gangly Youth
- Jandek
- Lantern
- Microwaves
- Ritchie White Orchestra
- Sediment Club
- She Might Bite
- Slug Guts
- Street Gnar
- TV Ghost
- Twin Sister Radio

Dahm Cipolla of The Phantom Family Halo was intended to play but cancelled due to illness. He was replaced by Virginia grindcore band Suppression.

Saturday, September 29 @ American Turners

- Ashcan Orchestra
- Binary Marketing Show
- Black Kaspar
- Cave Bears
- Cool Memories
- Crys
- Suppression
- Fat History Month (Last minute addition.)
- David Liebe Hart
- Globsters
- Guerrilla Toss
- Kark
- Lil B
- Merchandise
- Michael Zerang & Darin Gray
- Neil Hamburger
- PC Worship
- R. Stevie Moore
- Raw Thug
- Shaved Women
- Wet
- White Walls

Sunday, September 30 @ The Workhouse Ballroom

- Papa M
- Wooden Wand
- Josef Van Wissem

=== Cropped Out II ===
The 2011 edition took place entirely at The Crummy Den, a warehouse space that was turned into a DIY venue for the weekend, and took place from Friday, September 27 to Sunday, September 29, 2011.

Friday, November 11

- MV & EE
- Dope Body
- Sun Araw
- Savages
- Mount Carmel
- Natives
- Christmas Bride
- Anwar Sadat
- Cough Cool
- Shit & Shine
- Alcohol Party
- Shedding
- Axel Cooper
- Learner Dancer

Saturday, November 12

- Bill Orcutt
- Guardian Alien
- Pygmy Shrews
- The Dreebs
- Angel Olsen
- Chat Logs
- John Wesley Coleman III
- Natural Child
- Last Year's Men
- Sapat
- Tropical Trash
- Black God
- Mayor Daley
- The Men
- Fat History Month
- Circuit Des Yeux
- Jovontaes
- Angels In America
- Cross
- Arcane Rifles
- Video Daughters

Sunday, November 1

- Coliseum
- Young Widows
- Scratch Acid

=== Cropped Out I ===
The 2010 Edition took place at KingFish and American Turners Louisville from October 1 to October 3, 2010.

Friday, October 1 @ KingFish

- Fielded
- Sapat
- Julianna Barwick
- The Phantom Family Halo
- Moon Duo

Saturday, October 2 @ American Turners

- The Highlife
- Rabble Rabble
- LUSHES
- Slow Horse
- Prideswallower
- Wishgift
- Straight A's
- Parlour
- CAVE
- Young Widows
- Pissed Jeans
- Alex Barnett
- Learner Dancer
- Nzambi
- SKIMASK
- DAD
- Geffika
- Life Partner
- Natural Geographic
- MEAH!
- PC Worship
- CACAW
- Ga'an

Sunday, October 3 @ American Turners

- SOVA
- Heavy Cream
- Sean Walsh & The National Reserve
- Animal City
- Idiot Glee
- Warmer Milks
- Rude Weirdo
- FLIGHT
- Golden Boys
- JEFF the Brotherhood
- Magik Markers
- Softcheque
- Reading Group
- Gangly Youth
- Spectre Folk
- Tinsel Teeth
- PUJOL
- Giving Up
- State Champion
- Catherine Irwin
- Spider Bags
- King Kong
- Sic Alps

== See also ==
- List of attractions and events in the Louisville metropolitan area
