= Live From the Barrage =

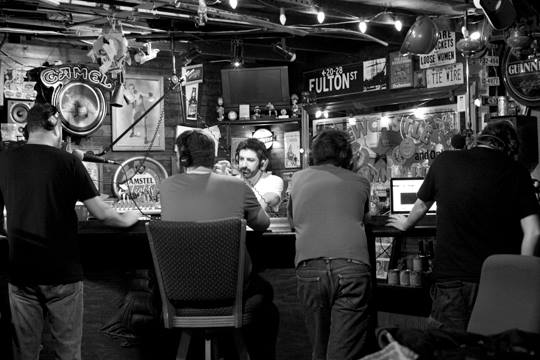
- Live From the Barrage
- Genre: Talk, Comedy, Music, Entertainment
- Running time: 3 1/2 hours
- Country of origin: United States
- Language(s): English
- Home station: Radio NOPE
- Hosted by: John Houlihan
- Starring: See List of Live From the Barrage staff
- Original release: January 1, 2012
- No. of episodes: 300
- Website: http://livefromthebarrage.nyc
- Podcast: LFTB - Podcasts

Live From the Barrage is a combination music, call-in, and comedy Internet radio show/podcast hosted independently by John Houlihan since 2012, in a bar in a garage in Queens, New York. The show's slogan is: "it's Friday night and we're in fuggin' Queens". The show began on livestream (now: Vimeo Livestream) 2012-2015 (episodes 1-118) and then Radio NOPE from 2015–Present (119-Present). The format is largely talk based, ranging from music, sports, national events & more with both call-in and in-person guests.

Founded in 2012, Live From The Barrage broadcasts live at 8PM Eastern each week drawing regular listeners from around the world. Since launching the show has aired over 300 episodes and has hosted celebrity guests such as Marc Maron, DMC (of Run DMC), Billy Bragg, Steve Albini, Mike Watt, Tom Scharpling, Jon Wurster, C. J. Ramone, Pussy Riot, Eric Bachmann, & many more.

The show is noted for its irreverent tone and occasional forays into Insult comedy and a roast like atmosphere. The interplay and frequent frustration between the host and the other on-air personalities being a key part of the show. The shows feature a live weekly game hosted by producer Ryan Collison, which often involve the guests and the listeners. It also features a live news read by newsman and producer Tommy Rockstar, that is frequently interrupted by wisecracks and (frequently inebriated) commentary.

The show has been featured favorably in the New York Times and on FOX5 News in New York.

Barrage has listeners and callers around the world, from the United States and Canada, to as far afield as the U.K., Germany and Australia. Regular callers and in-studio guests of note have included Steve Albini, Matt Sweeney, Justin Foley of the Austerity Program and many others.

== Background ==
Host Houlihan and sometime cohost Patrick Walsh both play in the New York band Risk/Reward. The show also features calls from various fans and personalities featuring parody characters such as Bill Clintron (a Bill Clinton parody), Tilda Swintron (a caricature of Tilda Swinton with a thick, clearly male, heavy New York accent) and actual NY personalities with difficult to believe nicknames. It is sometimes difficult to discern a character from a real person that also participates in the frequent poker games that occur after the show. The show's jargon includes pluralizing words that are not meant to be pluralized, referring to any manner of recording as "tapes" (CD Tapes, MP3 Tapes, Record Tapes) and appending "tron" at the end of anything that ends in the phonetic "ton".

=== Guests ===
Comedians

- Marc Maron
- Jim Norton
- Jena Friedman
- Des Bishop
- Tom Scharpling
- Bryan Bruner

Zoophiles

- Malcolm Brenner

Musicians

- Billy Bragg
- DMC of (Run DMC)
- Professor Griff ( Public Enemy)
- Kenny Aronoff
- Daxx Nielson (Cheap Trick)
- Matt Sweeney (Chavez)
- Erich Bachman of Archers of Loaf
- Lucky Lehrer (Circle Jerks, Redd Kross, Bad Religion)
- Steve Albini (Shellac, Big Black)
- Bob Bert (Sonic Youth)
- Kevin Kinney (Drivin N Cryin)
- Guy Picciotto (Fugazi)
- Jon Wurster (Superchunk, Bob Mould Band, The Mountain Goats)
- Buzz Osborne (Melvins)
- Richie Ramone (Ramones)
- David Pajo (Slint, Zwan)
- Vern Rumsey (Unwound)
- Jason Loewenstein and Bob D'Amico (Sebadoh)
- Phil Manley (Trans Am)
- Syd Butler (Les Savy Fav)
- Andrew Falkous (Future of the Left, mclusky)
- Pussy Riot
- Champagne Jerry
- C. J. Ramone (Ramones)
- Andy Shernoff (The Dictators)
- Jason Narducy (Bob Mould Band, Superchunk)
- Stan Demeski (The Feelies)
- Clay Tarver (Chavez)
- Dave Hill (Slade)
- Mike Watt
- Juliana Hatfield
- Question Mark (? and the Mysterians)
- Eugene Robinson (Oxbow)
- Gregg Turner (Angry Samoans)
- Doug Gillard (Guided by Voices)
- Bill Janovitz (Buffalo Tom)
- Steve Wynn (The Dream Syndicate)
- Chip Z'Nuff (Enuff Z'Nuff)
- Matt Kadane (Bedhead)
- Justin Foley (The Austerity Program)
- Will Johnson (Centro-Matic)
- Bob Nanna (Braid, Hey Mercedes)
- Tripp Lamkins (the Grifters)
- Conan Neutron and the Secret Friends
- Jawbox (J. Robbins, Kim Coletta, Bill Barbot, Zach Barocas)
- Matt Gentling (Archers of Loaf)
- The Independents
- Rick Valentin (Poster Children)
- Steve Myers (The Afghan Whigs)
- Joe Gorelick (Garden Variety, Bluetip)
- Brett White (Gren)
- Lyle Hysen (Das Damen)
- Jim Atkins (Jimmy Eat World)
- Larry Damore (Pegboy)
- Eytan Mirsky
- Doug E. Beans (Murphy's Law)

Politicians

- John Liu
- Napoleon Harris
- Randy Bryce
- Paul Graziano

Actors

- Richard Kline (Three's Company)
- Martin Starr (Silicon Valley, Freaks and Geeks)
- Jorge Pallo

Journalists

- Maggie Serota
- Addy Baird
- Connor Kilpatrick

Authors

- Howie Hubberman (The Godfather of the Sunset Strip)
- Michael Finkel (The Stranger in the Woods)
- Jesse Cannon

Scientists

- Alex Filippenko

Documentarians

- Steve Tozzi (City Gardens documentary)
- Wes Orshoski (Lemmy: Motörhead documentary)
- Seth Keal

Media Producers

- Stuart S. Shapiro (Night Flight)
- Chris Prynoski (Metalocalypse)

Music Management

- Monte A. Melnick (Ramones tour manager)
- Vickie Hamilton (Guns N' Roses Manager)
- Noel Monk (Van Halen Road Manager)

== Show staff ==
Current

- John Houlihan – Host
- Tommy Rockstar – producer, Newsman
- Ryan Collison – writer, producer, Cohost, Game show host
- Adam Kurzawa – producer
- "Travelin' Pete" Pavicevic – writer/Producer
- Patrick Walsh – Cohost
- Mario Asaro – Cohost

Former

- Dave Harrison – Cohost (2012-2014)
- Brian Musikoff – producer, Cohost (2015-2016)
- Mike "Hair Du" Howells – producer, Cohost (2012-2015)
