= Replicator (band) =

American noise rock band

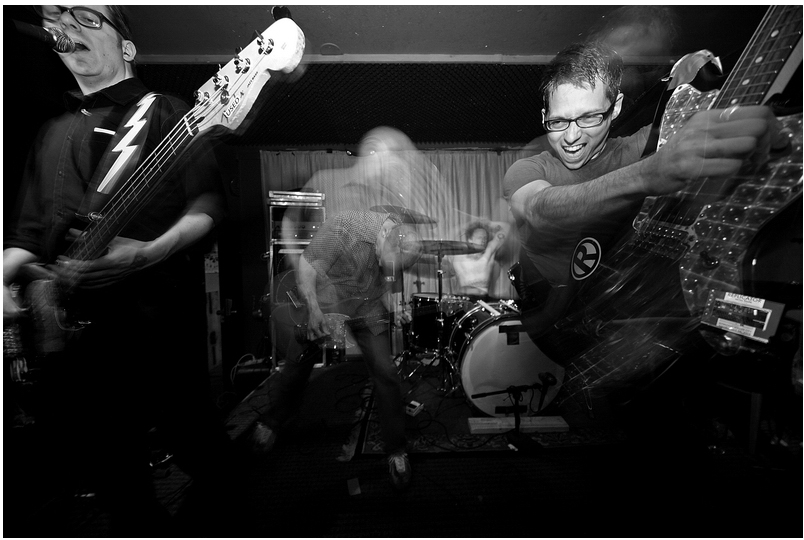
- Replicator performing in 2008

Background information
- Origin: Oakland, California, U.S.
- Genres: Noise rock, post-hardcore, post-punk, math rock, indie rock
- Years active: Late 1999 – April 2008
- Labels: Radio Is Down; Substandard; Feedback Loop
- Members: Conan Neutron; Ben Adrian; Chris Bolig; Todd Grant
- Website: Official website

Replicator was an American noise rock band from Oakland, California. The band consisted of Conan Neutron (electric guitar/vocals/tape deck operation), Ben Adrian (bass guitar/vocals/keyboard), and Chris Bolig (drums). The band was joined by Todd Grant on rhythm guitar for live performances in later years.

The band members were advocates of the DIY punk ethic, as popularized by bands such as Fugazi and The Minutemen. Replicator started as a bay area Indie rock band of little distinction before finding their signature sound, often compared to bands such as Shellac, The Jesus Lizard, Steel Pole Bathtub, and the Melvins. The band had multiple songs influenced by literary works, including those of Kurt Vonnegut, Stephen King, Philip K. Dick and Neal Stephenson. Largely ignored by both the mainstream and underground music world, their irreverent attitude, and "cleverness" won them over a very small but dedicated fanbase, including a handful of famous fans, including comedian Patton Oswalt and comic book author Warren Ellis.

== Music ==
Replicator had a sound based on unusual and urgent time signatures, dissonance, repetitive heavy rhythms, an often angular guitar sound, and Neutron and Adrian's urgent, sometimes dueling vocals. The songs did not have traditional verse/chorus/verse structure and the arrangements were, at times sparse and at other times chaotic. Replicator's sound was often associated with science fiction, paranoia, and somewhat obscure pop culture references, the band frequently cited the fact that they did not have any love songs in their press materials.

Straddling the fine line between "social commentary and smart ass revelry" as well as "technical precision and reckless abandon," Replicator used analog tape deck to play samples live until switching to a laptop computer with the Bludgeonsoft software Back to Basics for sampling. Song titles such as: Bawkbakwak Bawkbagone, Warrior Needs Food, Badly, Frank Lloyd Wrong and Login with my fist, rarely conformed to standard structure, however according to band members in multiple interviews, the song titles almost always are inspired by or inspire the lyrical content of the songs, unlike other bands with lengthy song titling such as Don Caballero (who do not have vocals) and Minus the Bear.

The band recorded their first record Winterval with Bob Weston of the band Shellac, triggering understandable comparisons to that band. Shortly afterwards, bass player Dan Kennedy left the band. The lineup solidified in 2001 when Indiana expatriate Ben Adrian joined the band on bass guitar. Adrian often joked that he was still "filling in" on bass 6 years later. 2002 and 2003 saw the band tinker with sound effects, taking the sampling (or "grand theft audio" as Neutron put it) practices of Steel Pole Bathtub and adding this to their developing aggressive and chaotic sound, as well as keyboard. "While Replicator admittedly wears its influences — harsh-but-concise rockers Shellac, progressive punk trio Unwound, and noise pioneers Sonic Youth — on its sleeve, the band's music is more than just a cheap knockoff."

This sound was represented in the album You Are Under Surveillance. Frequently cited as chaotic, dense and paranoid, Surveillance was apparently a loose concept album based upon the ideas of "paranoia, lost freedom of choice, airborne revenge, the end of the world, the problems and consequences of an overgrown consumerist, bottom line-oriented culture; and the merits of applied righteous indignation".

In September 2004, on one of their "ReplicaTours", Replicator's van was broken into and their guitars and keyboards were stolen. Luckily they were able to borrow the equipment of their tourmates Greenlight the Bombers and continue. This theft occurred during the 2004 rash of equipment thefts that plagued many working musicians.

The end of the Arctic Monkeys 2006 song "Perhaps Vampires Is A Bit Strong But", bears a resemblance to Replicator's 2001 song "Ka-Tet". A song of little distinction or notoriety, but was released 5 years earlier. Some fans of the band have questioned if it is a case of simultaneous inspiration, or a case of (likely) musical plagiarism.

2007's Machines Will Always Let You Down, seems to also be a loosely based concept album, this time around the conflict between man and machine. The press materials state that it is: 10 songs about Nanotechnological assassination, time travel, building sex robots, the eternal battle of man vs. machine and other things.

This record was recorded by Vern Rumsey of the band Unwound, and was released on Olympia's Radio Is Down record label.

2008 also saw several more US Tours, including a full us tour documented in a tour journal on the music website superstarcastic.com. These shows were largely well received, with the band's energy and "gleefully chaotic" sound often cited in reviews

On January 2, 2008, an announcement was made on the Replicator website that "After 8 years, 3 albums, 2 eps, 4 vans, almost 200 shows, a handful of compilation appearances, and countless floors" the band had agreed to an amicable mutual break up with plenty of warning. After recording a final ep, (Including a cover of Babyland's Arthur Jermyn), released again on Radio Is Down, Replicator played their last show at The Hemlock Tavern in San Francisco on April 5.

In 2013, the French webzine gave an exhausting and detailed review to the Replicator discography "Replicator is not content to be maniacs of an impeccable and indestructible rhythm, to ping the air like neurasthenic robots. They also offer a more natural mess, a propensity to confuse the tracks, a complexity of which one wonders where they will end up landing, while offering unsuspected melodies.""Replicator keeps the optics of an aggressive sound in songs where fun is not absent "

The band convened for a "one off reunion" in May 2015 for the PRF BBQ West Coast, with no plans for future reunions. In an interview with Shiny Grey Monotone, Neutron said: "I loved that band and loved my time in it. We did everything exactly the way we wanted to do it and did a bunch of weird stuff that some people seemed to enjoy. It was completely on our terms and ended when it should have, cool. It meant something to some people, and I'm pretty sure we left the world a wee but better than how it was when that band came into being, or at least more confused."

== Post-Replicator activities ==
After the break-up former members of Replicator started two new bands with Ben Adrian forming a post-punk/shoegazing group called Guitar vs. Gravity while Conan Neutron and Chris Bolig formed the short lived classic rock meets noise rock band Mount Vicious. After the break-up of Mount Vicious, Chris Bolig began playing drums for Adrian's "small format rock band" Cartographer and Neutron started the band Victory and Associates (2009-2014).

In 2015 Neutron began Conan Neutron & the Secret Friends with Melvins drummer Dale Crover, Tony Ash and producer Toshi Kasai. In 2020, it was revealed he was also part of the band Household Gods with David Pajo of Slint and Vern Rumsey of Unwound.

Neutron runs the podcast Conan Neutron's Protonic Reversal, which is considered one of the definitive information sources for artists in the noise-rock, post-punk and "weird music" genres.

Adrian works at Line 6 and is a key player behind their Helix unit amongst other offerings and is considered a leading voice in the field of sound design.

== Discography ==
=== Albums ===
- Winterval (2001)
- You Are Under Surveillance (2004)
- Machines Will Always Let You Down (2007)

=== Singles and EPs ===
- "EP" (2002)
- "DDBBLLVVZZNN" split EP with Lower Forty-Eight (2003)
- "Whangbar Province EP" Whangbar Province EP (2008)

=== Compilations ===
- "Tired of Standing Still" (Journey to the End of the Night, Pt. 2) Highpoint Lowlife, 2001
- "bEASTfest 2001" (Ka-Tet) Whole Enchilada, 2001
- "bEASTfest 2002" (ft. Jesus <live on KXLU>) Whole Enchilada, 2002
- "Wäntage USA's 21st Release Hits Omnibus" 2XCD (Alert Status: 0), Wantage USA, 2004
