= John D. Sweeney =

John D. Sweeney may refer to:

- John David Sweeney, first person to receive a United States Social Security number
- John D. Sweeney, professor of Medieval English at Seton Hall University and father of musician Matt Sweeney
- John D. Sweeney, Democratic candidate for West Virginia's 4th congressional district in the 1926 United States House of Representatives elections
