= Bennati =

Bennati is an Italian surname. Notable people with the surname include:

- Adam Bennati, American musician
- Daniele Bennati (born 1980), Italian cyclist
- Giuseppe Bennati (1921–2006), Italian film director and writer
