= Piscitelli =

Piscitelli is an Italian surname. Notable people with the surname include:

- Mike Piscitelli, American music video director
- Riccardo Piscitelli (born 1993), Italian footballer
- Sabby Piscitelli (born 1983), American professional wrestler and football player
