= Chavez (band) =

American band

- Chavez playing at I'll Be Your Mirror, Alexandra Palace, London, May 2012

Background information
- Origin: New York, New York, United States
- Genres: Indie rock; math rock; post-hardcore; noise rock
- Years active: 1993–present
- Label: Matador
- Spinoff of: Wider
- Members: Matt Sweeney; James Lo; Clay Tarver; Scott Marshall

Chavez is an American band from New York City, formed in 1993. After a period of inactivity, the band re-formed in 2006. They released two independent non-charting albums in the mid-1990s.

Influenced by a wide variety of rock bands, including the Jesus Lizard, Blue Öyster Cult, and Cheap Trick, Chavez utilizes angular, asymmetrical riffs and dramatic dynamic shifts. The band is fronted by guitarist Matt Sweeney, who was previously a member of Skunk and Wider, and played with Guided by Voices. Other members include drummer James Lo (also of Wider), guitarist Clay Tarver (Bullet Lavolta) and bassist Scott Marshall (son of director Garry Marshall).

The band quickly gained a following in the New York underground scene following the release of their first single "Repeat the Ending". Their debut album Gone Glimmering was released in 1995 and was followed by the EP Pentagram Ring. The music video for the song "Break Up Your Band" aired in an episode of MTV's Beavis and Butt-Head, and the band toured with Guided by Voices and Bardo Pond. Chavez's second full-length album Ride the Fader was released in 1996, and was praised by Entertainment Weekly as "a fine specimen of spare, brainy post-metal hard rock".

While Chavez never officially disbanded, they released no new material and played few shows between 1999 and 2006. In 2006, Matador Records released Better Days Will Haunt You, a compilation of virtually all of Chavez's studio material up to that point, with the addition of new vocals for the song "White Jeans". The band played a few shows in support of the compilation, and later played with other bands such as Pavement and Sonic Youth.

In 2001, during Chavez's period of inactivity, guitarist Matt Sweeney went on to join Smashing Pumpkins frontman/guitarist Billy Corgan and Slint guitarist David Pajo to form Zwan. Sweeney recorded an album with Will Oldham (under the moniker Bonnie 'Prince' Billy) in 2005 titled Superwolf, as well producing and playing on Early Man's debut record for Matador, Closing In. Sweeney is also involved in the NYC anti-band Soldiers of Fortune who have put out two records with Mexican Summer. Clay Tarver later directed television commercials, wrote the script for the film Joy Ride, and was the co-showrunner and an executive producer of Silicon Valley. Matt Sweeney played guitar on Johnny Cash's American VI released posthumously in 2010 and played in Iggy Pop's band for the Post Pop Depression record and tour. The band was chosen to perform at the ATP I'll Be Your Mirror festival organized by ATP & Portishead in September 2011 in Asbury Park, New Jersey.

== Discography ==
=== Albums ===
- Gone Glimmering (1995)
- Ride the Fader (1996)
- Better Days Will Haunt You (compilation released in 2006)

=== Other ===
- Pentagram Ring (EP) (1995)
- Their cover of the song "Little Twelvetoes" was included at track 10 on Schoolhouse Rock! Rocks (1996)
- Cockfighters (EP) (2017)
