= I Gave You =

EP by Bonny / Sweeney
- Released: 26 July 2005
- Label: Drag City / Domino; DC298

Professional ratings
Review scores
Source	Rating
Allmusic	3/5 stars

I Gave You by Bonny / Sweeney is a CD EP released, July 26, 2005 on Drag City in the US, and Domino in Europe. The title track is taken from the album Superwolf (2005), a collaboration between Will Oldham and Matt Sweeney. The disc is an Enhanced CD, and contains the music video of "I Gave You" directed by Mike Piscitelli.

== Track listing ==
1. "I Gave You" (2:39)
2. "My Circle" (3:00)
3. "Four Screams" (3:24)
4. "Birch Ballad" (3:41)
