= The Hard Quartet =

American indie rock supergroup

- Genres: Indie rock
- Years active: 2023–present
- Labels: Matador
- Members: Stephen Malkmus; Matt Sweeney; Jim White; Emmett Kelly

The Hard Quartet is an indie rock supergroup formed in May 2023. Its members are Stephen Malkmus, Matt Sweeney, Jim White, and Emmett Kelly. Malkmus, Sweeney, and Kelly all share vocal, guitar, and bass duties in the Hard Quartet, while White is the group's drummer.

Malkmus is primarily known for being the frontman and primary singer-songwriter of Pavement during the 1990s, while Sweeney was the frontman and guitarist of the band Chavez during the same decade. White is one of the founding members of the Australian instrumental rock band Dirty Three. Kelly, in addition to being the leader of the Cairo Gang, previously collaborated with White on numerous projects, beginning with Will Oldham's 2006 album The Letting Go. Malkmus and Sweeney knew each other for many years before Sweeney first proposed the idea for the Hard Quartet, which he did while he and Malkmus were collaborating on the latter's 2019 solo album Traditional Techniques.

The Hard Quartet was first announced in July 2024, and they released their first single, "Earth Hater", that same month. The following month, they released their second single, "Rio's Song", accompanied by a music video based on the video for the Rolling Stones' 1981 song "Waiting on a Friend". The Hard Quartet's debut studio album, also called The Hard Quartet, was released on Matador Records on October 4, 2024. According to Metacritic, it has received generally favorable reviews from music critics.

== Discography ==
- The Hard Quartet (2024)
