= Ashley Altadonna =

American filmmaker, musician, author, activist

Ashley Altadonna (born in 1979) is an American transgender filmmaker, musician, author and activist. Altadonna first started her career path as the lead singer and guitarist in her band, New Blind Nationals. Altadonna shifted her career focus towards filmmaking and went on to produce three feature films.

== Early life and education ==
Ashley Altadonna was born and raised in Houston, Texas, in 1979. In 2000 she moved to Milwaukee, Wisconsin, where she currently lives. She studied at University of Wisconsin-Milwaukee and graduated with Bachelor of Fine Arts in 2004. Altadonna has been a proactive activist for the transgender community.

== Career ==
Prior to Altadonna's film making career she was a singer and guitarist for a band called New Blind Nationals. During this period, Altadonna had not started her transition. In 2004, the band split up and Altadonna switched her focus towards film making. In 2014, after Altadonna's transition a new band had been formed, The Glacial Speed. She spent most of her time on her musicianship and work as a filmmaker. Much of her music covers her transition as well as personal growth.

One of Ashley Altadonna's goals in film making relates to trans activism. Specifically, she would like to educate individuals on the various challenges trans people face around the world. Altadonna had her own film production company formed in 2008 called Tall Lady Pictures, LLC. Altadonna has produced the following three short films: Making the Cut (2012), Whatever Suits You (2006), and Playing with Gender (2007). Many of Altadonna's films have been screened at festivals in New York City, Seattle, and San Francisco, as well as in London, Berlin, and Melbourne.

Altadonna began working on her first film, the documentary Making the Cut, in 2008. The film synopsis surrounds Altadonna's goal to raise enough money for her gender reassignment surgery. The film explores and compares Altadonna's early life to her current life. Throughout the film she highlights the financial and social issues transgender individuals face and challenges social norms and ideologies on transgender people. In the film, Altadonna displays the many interviews she undergoes, and the many different fundraising activities she has been involved in during her activism for transgender rights. The reasons for these efforts, is for Altadonna to successfully raise $20,000 for her gender reassignment surgery as well as to fund this film, Making the Cut. The main crowdfunding site that Ashley Altadonna used for her first film was Kickstarter, through which she had raised $6000 for her project by November 2012. With this choice of crowdfunding, much of the participation comes from the demands of the audience rather than Altadonna, since the money is coming from fundraising. This film's campaign is what created some of Altadonna's acknowledgement to the public. This led to Altadonna becoming such an activist for transgender individuals.

Altadonna has been a contributor to many online magazines, and has been featured in Trans/Love: Radical Sex, Love & Relationships Beyond the Gender Binary. Most of her contributions cover her transgender identity experience.

== Filmography ==
- Whatever Suits You (2006)
- Playing with Gender (2007)
- Making the Cut (2012)

== See also ==
- Conan Neutron & the Secret Friends
