= A Broke Moon Rises =

Studio album by Papa M
- Released: August 17, 2018
- Studios: Gargot Audio, Los Angeles, California
- Length: 36:03
- Label: Drag City

Papa M chronology
Highway Songs (2016)	A Broke Moon Rises (2018)

Professional ratings
Aggregate scores
Source	Rating
AnyDecentMusic?	6.9/10
Metacritic	74/100
Review scores
Source	Rating
AllMusic	3.5/5 stars
Drowned in Sound	8/10
Exclaim!	8/10
Paste	7.5/10

A Broke Moon Rises is a studio album by American musician David Pajo, under his pseudonym Papa M. It was released August 17, 2018 under Drag City.

== Critical reception ==
A Broke Moon Rises was met with "generally favorable" reviews from critics. At Metacritic, which assigns a weighted average rating out of 100 to reviews from mainstream publications, this release received an average score of 74, based on 7 reviews.

== Track listing ==
A Broke Moon Rises track listing
No.	Title	Length
1.	"The Upright Path"	4:37
2.	"Walt's"	4:10
3.	"A Lighthouse Reverie"	7:51
4.	"Shimmers"	6:22
5.	"Spiegel im Spiegel"	13:03
