= Gone Glimmering =

Studio album by Chavez
- Released: May 23, 1995
- Recorded: December 1994–January 1995
- Genres: Indie rock, noise rock
- Length: 30:00
- Label: Matador
- Producers: Bob Weston; Bryce Goggin; John Agnello; Chavez

Chavez chronology
| Gone Glimmering (1995) | Ride the Fader (1996) |

Gone Glimmering is the debut studio album of American indie rock band Chavez. It was released via Matador Records on May 23, 1995. The album was recorded over weekends in December 1994 and January 1995 at various locations with various producers/engineers (Bob Weston, Bryce Goggin and John Agnello).

A music video was released for the track "Break Up Your Band".

== Critical reception ==
Professional ratings
Review scores
| Source | Rating |
|---|---|
| AllMusic | 4/5 stars |
| The Encyclopedia of Popular Music | 3/5 stars |
| Entertainment Weekly | B+ |
| The Great Indie Discography | 7/10 |
| Kerrang! | 4/5 stars |
| MusicHound Rock | 4/5 stars |
| Pitchfork | 8.6/10 |
| Tiny Mix Tapes | 4.5/5 marks |

Billboard wrote that "no debut of late combines guts and gray matter quite as fluently as this New York quartet's killer blast of postnoise rock." The Albuquerque Tribune called it "a big load of rock, pounded with a New York Noise mallet."

== Track listing ==
1. "Nailed to the Blank Spot" - 2:07
2. "Break Up Your Band" - 2:56
3. "Laugh Track" - 3:58
4. "The Ghost by the Sea" - 4:01
5. "Pentagram Ring" - 2:26
6. "Peeled Out Too Late" - 3:36
7. "The Flaming Gong" - 1:53
8. "Wakeman's Air" - 4:23
9. "Relaxed Fit" - 4:39

== Personnel ==
- James Lo – drums
- Scott Anthony Masciarelli – bass
- Matt Sweeney – vocals, guitar
- Clay Tarver – guitar
