= Household Gods (band) =

American rock band

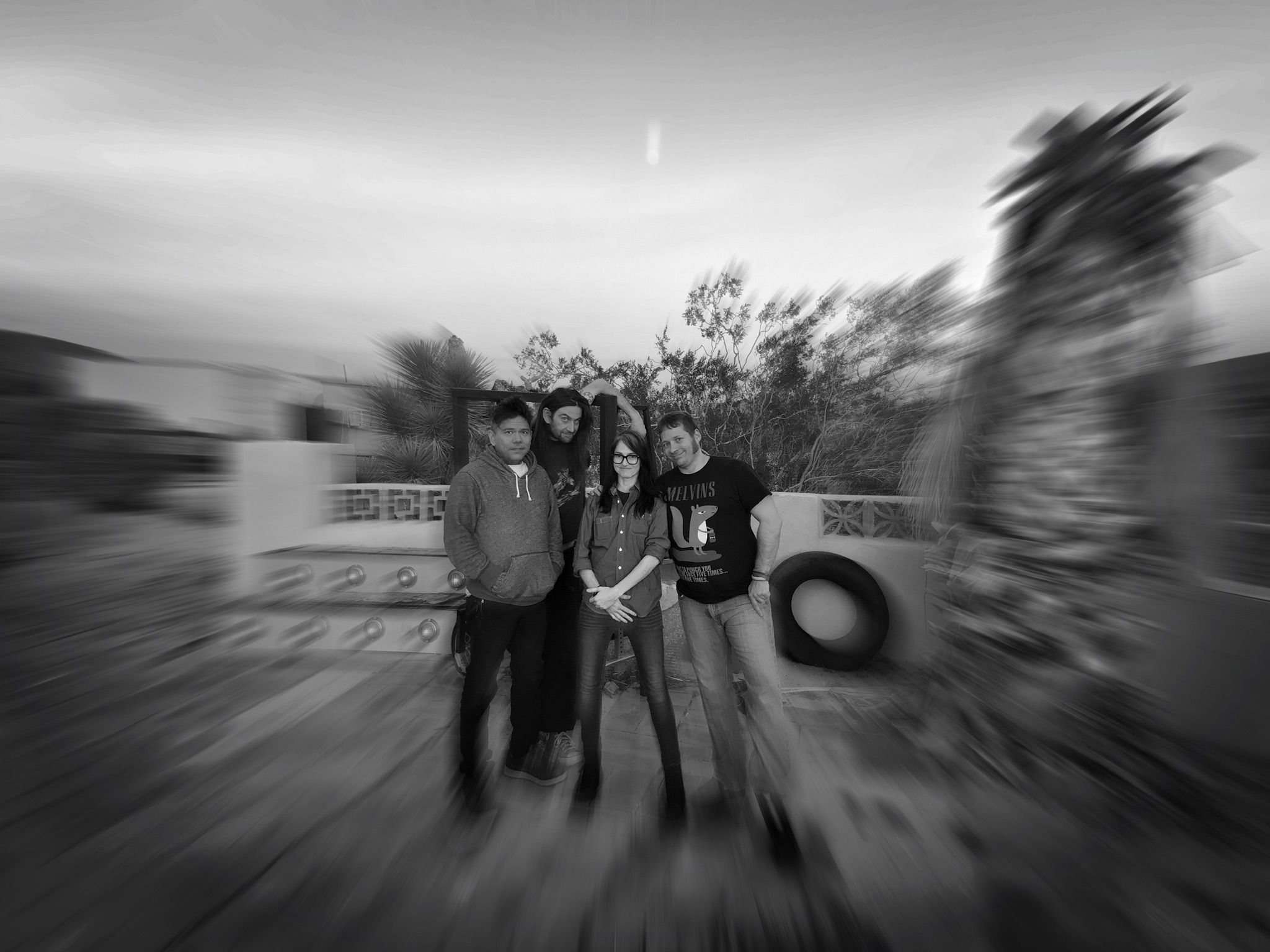

Background information
- Origin: Joshua Tree, California United States
- Genres: Experimental rock; indie rock; noise rock; math rock
- Years active: 2019-2020
- Past members: David Pajo; Vern Rumsey; Conan Neutron; Lauren K. Newman
- Website: www.householdgods.com

Household Gods was an American rock supergroup, featuring: David Pajo (Slint, Zwan, Papa M), Vern Rumsey (Unwound), Conan Neutron (Conan Neutron & the Secret Friends and Replicator), and Lauren K Newman. (LKN, Palo Verde).

== History ==
Their presence was revealed to the world on May 1, 2020. with the release of the single "Rest in Power"

A second song, "Shine Theory", premiered on May 28, 2020, on the Big Takeover. "What we can say here at Big Takeover is that we’re super-stoked to host the premiere of the desert/post-rock rumination/exaltation “Shine Theory” from the album. Kate Wakefield of Lung guests on airily floating vocals, with Pajo and Neutron on guitars, Rumsey on bass, and Newman on drums."

A third song Hostile Architecture was premiered on the music site I Heart Noise. "Musically its more Slint than Unwound – immensely heavy, but immensely catchy/atmospheric as well, which is exactly how one could describe “Hostile Architecture”. The riffs, the melodies – once you heard it, you would want to hear it again...and again...and again."

The record called Palace Intrigue was released on June 12, 2020. All of the songs were written and recorded on-site at Rancho De La Luna studio in Joshua Tree, California, and produced by David Catching.

The surviving members of the group appeared on the Milwaukee college station WMSE on June 2, 2020. calling the record a "creating for the act of creating". The members talk about there being no material prepared ahead of time 4 or 5 days, being inspired by similar projects such as the Desert Sessions and how the four musicians had never played together before recording. "We got together and tried to make something cool. Low to no pressure, and get back to the idea of playing for the sake of playing and the art of creation itself, rather than creation as a means to an end or to achieve a greater function or purpose. There was lots of trading riffs at the kitchen table."

"It was almost a snapshot or documentary of those days together, with the four of us. Especially with Lauren being gone now." Pajo said. The band members then praised Rancho De La Luna as being a place to unlock creativity from people that is at least partially due to the remote environment. "That was the beauty of it for me, we were just four equals doing our part." Pajo said, calling it a "True collaboration" In this interview is also revealed that: (Before the) Avalanche and (After the) Avalanche were borne out of completely misinterpreting Newman's instructions for the song Avalanche.

=== December 2019: Illness and death of Newman ===
Drummer/guitarist Lauren K. Newman died on December 4, 2019, from complications of Crohn's disease. Neutron is quoted in the Portland Mercury as saying "It kills me to know that she won't be around to reap the rewards of this. I felt like this was going to be huge for her, and that people were finally going to get to hear what a world class talent she was. It always seemed like she was one big tour away from everyone freaking the fuck out about her. She never caught that break."

In a joint interview on WMSE and later on Live From the Barrage, the band members mentioned they were originally unaware of Newman's poor health. "She didn't want to be seen as a musician with a disability" and it "wasn't a Make-A-Wish situation or something like that." "She deserves to be mourned, but she deserves to be better recognized. We hope this album provides a path for that."

=== August 2020: Death of Rumsey ===
Rumsey died in August 2020; he was 47. His death sparked an outpouring of support and testimonials amongst many music communities.

=== Breakup ===
After the death of Vern Rumsey a breakup announcement was made on Pitchfork:

"Household Gods was a band comprised of four musicians with their own musical histories and challenges to overcome. We came together with no expectations or rules and something cool came out of it. There were vague plans for it to be more than that, more records, shows. More. A little light in a world of darkness. It is fair to say that it was going to be difficult to carry on Household Gods without Lauren K. Newman, but there definitely cannot be any Household Gods without Vern and LKN."

== Band members ==
- David Pajo – guitar (2019–2020)
- Vern Rumsey – bass guitar (2019–2020, died 2020)
- Conan Neutron – vocals, guitar, organ (2019–2020)
- Lauren K. Newman – drums, guitar (2019, died 2019)

== Discography ==
=== Studio albums ===
- Palace Intrigue (2020)
