= Closing In =

Studio album by Early Man
- Released: October 11, 2005
- Genres: Heavy metal, speed metal, thrash metal
- Length: 42:05
- Label: Matador
- Producer: Matt Sweeney

Early Man chronology
| Closing In (2005) | Death Potion (2010) |

Closing In is the debut studio album by American heavy metal band Early Man, released on October 11, 2005. There are clear influences from heavy metal bands like Black Sabbath and thrash metal bands like Metallica. Mike Conte's vocal style is very similar to Ozzy Osbourne and Rob Halford, while not exactly imitating them.

The album also features another heavy/speed metal attribute: aggressive, "don't fuck with me" lyrics, as heard on "War Eagle", "Thrill of the Kill", and "Evil Is".

== Track listing ==
1. Four Walls – 2:42
2. War Eagle – 3:14
3. Death Is the Answer – 5:35
4. Feeding Frenzy – 3:23
5. Thrill of the Kill – 4:35
6. Like a Goddamn Rat – 3:10
7. Fist Shaker – 3:43
8. Evil Is – 4:27
9. Brain Sick – 3:32
10. Contra – 3:53
11. Raped and Pillaged – 3:51

== Reception ==
Professional ratings
Review scores
| Source | Rating |
|---|---|
| AllMusic | 3/5 stars |
| Pitchfork | 7.7/10 |

Closing In received mixed to positive reviews.

Pitchfork appreciated the old-school thrash metal style, and the "galloping riffs and booming power chords". The only negative stated was a significant degree of uniformity throughout the album, with only one or two songs varying in style.

AllMusic also appreciated the ferocity of the older style, but similarly criticized the uniformity, saying "Closing In is numbingly derivative" and that there is "nothing even remotely memorable or engaging about it".

== Personnel ==
- Mike Conte – guitar, bass, vocals
- Adam Bennati – drums
- Matt Sweeney – producer, additional guitars
