= Whatever, Mortal =

Studio album by Papa M
- Released: November 5, 2001
- Studio: Velvetone Music Studio, Louisville, Kentucky
- Label: Drag City DC170
- Producer: "Produced by no one in particular"

Papa M chronology
Live from a Shark Cage (1999)	Whatever, Mortal (2001)	Songs of Mac (2002)

Professional ratings
Review scores
Source	Rating
AllMusic	4.5/5 stars
Pitchfork Media	8.6/10.0

Whatever, Mortal is the second album by Papa M, the third such pseudonym used by David Pajo (after 'M' and 'Aerial M'), released in 2001 on the Chicago-based Drag City label (see 2001 in music).

== Track listing ==
1. "Over Jordan" - 4:20
2. "Beloved Woman" – 3:26
3. "Roses in the Snow" – 3:45
4. "Sorrow Reigns" – 1:18
5. "Krusty" – 3:54
6. "The Lass of Roch Royal" – 2:53
7. "Many Splendored Thing" – 3:53
8. "Glad You're Here With Me" – 3:23
9. "Tamu" – 3:18
10. "Sabotage" – 7:16
11. "Purple Eyelid" – 3:06
12. "The Unquiet Grave" - 5:13
13. "The Northwest Passage" - 5:44

== Personnel ==
- David Pajo - electric and acoustic guitar, piano, melodica, bass, drums, keyboards, vocals, backing vocals, banjo, sitar, harmonica, percussion
- Will Oldham - bass, piano, electric guitar, backing vocals
- Tara Jane O'Neil - banjo, acoustic guitar

with:

- Britt Walford - drums on "Beloved Woman"

Technical

- David Pajo - engineer, recording
- Mary Newton - front cover painting
