= Machines Will Always Let You Down =

Studio album by Replicator
- Released: Summer 2007
- Genre: Noise rock
- Label: Radio is Down
- Producer: Replicator

Replicator chronology
You Are Under Surveillance (2004)	Machines Will Always Let You Down (2007)	Whangbar Province EP (2008)

Machines Will Always Let You Down, released in 2007, is the third full-length album from the noise rock band, Replicator.

== Track listing ==
1. "Delicious Fornicake" - 2:17
2. "Payment www.yzzz.RD" - 4:51
3. "Assloads of Unrespect" - 4:11
4. "Fashionably Latent" - 4:57
5. "Enigma Machine" - 2:11
6. "King Shit of Fuck Mountain" - 2:18
7. "Happy Loyalty Day" - 1:53
8. "The Tiny Machines Are (Still) Out for Revenge" - 4:55
9. "Outrage Fatigue" - 3:24
10. "Login with My Fist" - 5:40
