= Home Before Dark =

Studio album by Neil Diamond
- Released: May 6, 2008
- Recorded: October 2007–February 2008
- Genre: Country rock
- Length: 63:01
- Label: American/Columbia
- Producer: Rick Rubin

Neil Diamond chronology
Classic – The Universal Masters Collection (2007)	Home Before Dark (2008)	The Best of Neil Diamond (2008)

Professional ratings
Review scores
Source	Rating
AllMusic	4/5 stars
Now	4/5 stars
OMM	4/5 stars
Rolling Stone	3/5 stars
The Times	2/5 stars

Home Before Dark is the twenty-seventh studio album by American singer-songwriter Neil Diamond. Released on May 5, 2008, it was the artist's second album for American Recordings, and also released on Columbia Records. The album was re-released on December 2, 2014 by UMe.

Home Before Dark received generally positive reviews from critics upon its release and topped the national albums charts in the United States, the United Kingdom, and New Zealand. It has since been accredited with album certifications in several regions.

In May 2008, at the age of 67, Neil Diamond was the oldest performer to have a number one record. This mark was previously held by Bob Dylan in 2006 with his Modern Times album, released when he was 65. However, Bob Dylan's 2009 album, Together Through Life, earned Dylan that position again, because Dylan released his most recent work at 67 years and 11 months compared to Diamond's releasing Home Before Dark at 67 years and 3 months.

The album is Diamond's second to be produced by Rick Rubin, a producer of hip-hop and heavy metal music, who had discovered a talent for re-invigorating the careers of musicians when he produced Aerosmith and a string of albums with Johnny Cash. After Cash's death, Diamond became the next artist to find his career given a shot in the arm via Rubin's production on his 2005 album 12 Songs. The album consists of original works and some remakes and was mixed by Dana Nielsen.The orchestral parts were arranged and conducted by David Campbell.

In May 2026 a second album from the Home Before Dark sessions, Wild at Heart, was released.

== Track listing ==
All songs were written by Neil Diamond, except where noted.

1. "If I Don't See You Again" – 7:13
2. "Pretty Amazing Grace" – 4:53
3. "Don't Go There" – 6:04
4. "Another Day (That Time Forgot)" (feat. Natalie Maines) – 6:12
5. "One More Bite of the Apple" – 6:39
6. "Forgotten" – 4:22
7. "Act Like a Man" – 4:04
8. "Whose Hands Are These" – 3:12
9. "No Words" – 4:49
10. "The Power of Two" – 4:35
11. "Slow It Down" – 4:56
12. "Home Before Dark" – 6:00
13. "Without Her" (Harry Nilsson) – 4:22
  - Deluxe Edition Bonus Track
14. "Make You Feel My Love" (Bob Dylan) – 4:38
  - Deluxe Edition Bonus Track

=== Deluxe Edition Bonus DVD ===
1. "Pretty Amazing Grace"
2. "If I Don't See You Again"
3. "Forgotten"
4. "The Boxer" (Paul Simon)

== Personnel ==
- Neil Diamond – lead vocals, guitars
- Benmont Tench – keyboards
- Mike Campbell – guitars, bass guitar
- Smokey Hormel – guitars, bass guitar
- Jonny Polonsky – guitars
- Matt Sweeney – guitars
- Marvin B. Gordy – timpani
- David Campbell – horn, string and woodwind arrangements; orchestra leader
- Charlie Bisharat – concertmaster
- Susie Katayama – orchestra contractor
- Rose Corrigan – bassoon
- Ralph Williams – clarinet
- Earl Dumler – English horn, oboe
- Dan Higgins – flute
- Steve Kujala – flute
- Robert Shulgold – flute
- Larry Klimas – flute (12)
- Don Markese – alto flute (12)
- Nathan Campbell – French horn
- Joe Meyer – French horn
- Steven Holtman – trombone
- Bill Reichenbach, Jr. – trombone
- Chuck Findley – trumpet
- Gary Grant – trumpet
- Doug Tornquist – tuba
- Larry Corbett – cello
- Rudy Stein – cello
- David Stone – double bass
- Andrew Duckles – viola
- Armen Garabedian – violin
- Julian Hallmark – violin
- Linda Press – backing vocals (3)
- Julia Waters – backing vocals (3)
- Maxine Waters – backing vocals (3)
- Natalie Maines – lead vocals (4)

=== Production ===
- Producer – Rick Rubin
- Production Coordination – Lindsay Chase and Sam Cole
- Recorded by Greg Fidelman and Andrew Scheps
- Additional Recording – Bernie Becker, Jason Lader and Dana Nielsen.
- Assistant Engineers – Phillip Broussard, Chris Holmes and Jim "Bud" Monti.
- Recorded at Arch Angel Studios and Akademie Mathematique of Philosophical Sound Research (Los Angeles, CA); Conway Studios (Hollywood, CA); Punkerpad West (Van Nuys, CA);
- Mixed by Dana Nielsen at Little People Studio (Los Angeles, CA).
- Mastered by Vlado Meller and Mark Santangelo at Universal Mastering Studios (New York, NY).
- Art Direction – Mary Maurer
- Design – Mary Maurer and Michael Lau-Robles
- Photography – Jesse Diamond

== Charts ==
=== Weekly charts ===
Chart (2008)	Peak position
Australian Albums (ARIA)	9
Austrian Albums (Ö3 Austria)	11
Belgian Albums (Ultratop Flanders)	5
Belgian Albums (Ultratop Wallonia)	46
Canadian Albums (Billboard)	3
Dutch Albums (Album Top 100)	2
German Albums (Offizielle Top 100)	14
Irish Albums (IRMA)	5
New Zealand Albums (RMNZ)	1
Norwegian Albums (VG-lista)	19
Scottish Albums (Official Charts)	2
Spanish Albums (Promusicae)	41
Swiss Albums (Schweizer Hitparade)	16
UK Albums (Official Charts)	1
US Billboard 200	1
US Indie Store Album Sales (Billboard)	3

=== Year-end charts ===
Chart (2008)	Peak position
Dutch Albums (Album Top 100)	46
New Zealand Albums (RMNZ)	38
UK Albums (OCC)	28
US Billboard 200	108

== Certifications ==
Region	Certification	Certified units/sales
Australia (ARIA)	Gold	35,000^{^}
Ireland (IRMA)	Gold	7,500^{^}
New Zealand (RMNZ)	Gold	7,500^{^}
United Kingdom (BPI)	Platinum	300,000^{^}
United States (RIAA)	Gold	500,000^{^}
^{^} Shipments figures based on certification alone.
