= Ryan Davis & the Roadhouse Band =

American musician

Ryan Davis & the Roadhouse Band is the stage name of American Americana musician Ryan Davis. Davis is from Louisville, Kentucky but is now based in Jeffersonville, Indiana. Davis was formerly a member of the band State Champion. Davis is also the founder of the record label Sophomore Lounge and co-founder of the music festival Cropped Out.

== History ==
After Davis' former band State Champion released their last album in 2018, Davis was unsure what to do next musically. Davis began making solo music and learning new instruments. Davis emerged with his debut solo studio album, Dancing on the Edge, under the moniker "Ryan Davis & The Roadhouse Band". The album received positive reviews. In 2025, Davis released his second album titled New Threats from the Soul on July 25.

== Discography ==
- Dancing on the Edge (2023)
- New Threats from the Soul (2025)
