= Hole of Burning Alms =

Compilation album by Papa M
- Released: 2004
- Genre: Post-rock
- Length: 78:28
- Label: Drag City (US), Domino (UK)

Hole of Burning Alms is a compilation album by Papa M, a moniker of American multi-instrumentalist David Pajo, collecting various singles and unreleased tracks released between 1995 and 2000. It was released in the United States by Drag City, and in the United Kingdom by the Domino Recording Company.

== Reception ==
The album received mostly positive reviews. Amanda Petrusich, writing for Pitchfork, remarked that "All these instrumental singles and B-sides make [Pajo's] sonic trajectory clearer and easier to organize–when taken together, they chug hard like [Pajo's] career, shifting chronologically from Slint-ish guitar surges to acoustic country hymns to traveling beats to scummy rock songs." Dusted Magazine reviewer Nathan Hogan stated that the album "organizes his material effectively while also reflecting the breadth of his solo career."

== Track listing ==
All songs were written by David Pajo, except where noted.

1. "Safeless" - 5:13
2. "Napoleon" - 3:45
3. "Vol de Nuit" - 5:38
4. "Wedding Song No. 3" - 5:45
5. "Mountains Have Ears" - 4:31
6. "Vivea" - 7:55
7. "Last Caress" (Glenn Danzig) - 3:40
8. "Travels in Constants" - 13:43
9. "Up North Kids #2" - 4:42
10. "She Said Yes" - 3:24
11. "Turn! Turn! Turn!" (Pete Seeger) - 16:22
12. "Xmas 1997" - 3:50
