= New Threats from the Soul =

Studio album by Ryan Davis & the Roadhouse Band
- Released: July 25, 2025
- Recorded: Late 2024–early 2025
- Studios: Machines with Magnets (Pawtucket); End of an Ear (Louisville); Suddenly (Philadelphia)
- Genres: Indie rock; alternative rock
- Length: 57:06
- Labels: Sophomore Lounge; Tough Love

Singles from New Threats from the Soul
- 1. "New Threats from the Soul" Released: May 7, 2025; 2. "Monte Carlo / No Limits" Released: June 9, 2025; 3. "Better If You Make Me" Released: July 22, 2025

New Threats from the Soul is the second studio album by the American Americana band Ryan Davis & the Roadhouse Band.

== Reception ==
Professional ratings
Aggregate scores
Source	Rating
AnyDecentMusic?	8.3/10
Metacritic	89/100
Review scores
Source	Rating
Beats Per Minute	84%
The Line of Best Fit	8/10
Paste	9.7/10
Pitchfork	8.7/10
PopMatters	9/10
Uncut	4.5/5 stars

On Metacritic, which assigns a normalized rating out of 100 to reviews from mainstream publications, the album received an average score of 89 based on 10 reviews, indicating "Universal acclaim." When reviewing the album for The Line of Best Fit, Janne Oinonen gave it an 8 out of 10, stating it "provides another compelling flowering of a unique and idiosyncratic songwriting talent." In his review of the album for Pitchfork, Sam Sodomsky writes that it is the "most overwhelming, singular display of Davis’ gifts to date: a record whose novelty is matched by its warmth and consistency," noting that "the lyrics are so good that I could spend this whole review quoting them, but I’d like to avoid that." He goes on to call it a "record that indulges in potentially alienating ideas," concluding that "uniformly, their performances feel inspired, as averse to cliché and open to interpretation as Davis’ writing."

In a review for Uncut magazine, Allan Jones writes, "At times these long, unwinding songs may remind you of the ruminative musings of Lambchop's Kurt Wagner, Okkervil River's Will Sheff, Will Oldham, maybe MJ Lenderman. Lou Reed, even." He notes that "the nine-minute title track that opens the album, for instance, blows in on a warm melodic wind, the kind of tune you might have heard coming through an open window in the Summer Of Love," likening the title track to "Groovin'" by the Rascals and ending by calling the album an "incredible head-spinning trip." Writing for Beats Per Minute, John Amen concludes, "With New Threats, Davis, flanked by the talented Roadhouse Band, makes his mark, perhaps indelibly, joining a select group of artists who are deepening, broadening, and revamping the Americana genre."

The Economist nominated New Threats From the Soul as one of their top ten albums of 2025: "This album travels the highways and byways of American music to tell picaresque stories about lives drifting out of focus. The lyrics are extraordinary."

== Track listing ==
All tracks are written by Ryan Davis.

No.	Title	Length
1.	"New Threats from the Soul"	9:21
2.	"Monte Carlo / No Limits"	5:55
3.	"Mutilation Springs"	11:49
4.	"Better If You Make Me"	6:00
5.	"The Simple Joy"	7:29
6.	"Mutilation Falls"	9:25
7.	"Crass Shadows (at Walden Pawn)"	7:07
Total length:		57:06

== Personnel ==
Credits adapted from Bandcamp.

=== Ryan Davis & the Roadhouse Band ===
- Ryan Davis – vocals, guitars, keyboards, melodica, harmonium, congas, hardware programming, other instrumentation, artwork, layout, photography
- Dan Davis – synthesizers, percussion, harmonica, Clavinet
- Elisabeth Fuchsia – viola, violin
- Will Lawrence – drums, piano, vocals
- Seth Manchester – percussion, sub-bass, software programming, recording, dubbing, mixing
- Jim Marlowe – bass, saxophone, Dood, EBow, additional tracking
- Christopher May – pedal steel, resonator
- Aaron Rosenblum – violin, sampling keyboard, tape loops

=== Additional contributors ===
- Alberto Azzolini – tuba
- Christopher Bush – synthesizers, tapes
- Ned Collette – piano
- Anthony Fossaluzza – electric piano
- Myriam Gendron – vocals
- Catherine Irwin – vocals
- Eric Lanham – synthesizers, saxophone
- Shutaro Noguchi – synthesizers, organ
- Will Oldham – vocals
- Emily Robb – guitar, additional tracking
- Grace Rogers – vocals, banjo
- Jenny Rose – vocals, photography
- Lou Turner – flute, vocals
- Shapeshifters' Local 401 Pub Choir – snaps, flaps, gang vocals, cups, cans
- Heba Kadry – mastering
- Chris Muth – lacquer cut
- Mark Fede – overdubbing assistance
- Robert Edmondson – overdubbing assistance
