= Live from a Shark Cage =

Studio album by Papa M
- Released: October 25, 1999
- Genre: Post-Rock
- Length: 59:00
- Label: Drag City DC170
- Producer: David Pajo; Nat Gleason; Steve Albini; Tim Gane

Papa M chronology
Live from a Shark Cage (1999)	Whatever, Mortal (2001)

Professional ratings
Review scores
Source	Rating
Allmusic	4/5 stars
Pitchfork Media	7.6/10 link

Live from a Shark Cage is the first album by Papa M, the third such pseudonym used by David Pajo (after 'M' and 'Aerial M'), released in 1999 on the Chicago-based Drag City label (see 1999 in music).

The album was released on both CD and 180-gram vinyl. As specified in the brief liner notes, "Roadrunner" was recorded in San Francisco by Nat Gleason, "Drunken Spree" was recorded in Chicago by Steve Albini (who produced Pajo's previous band Slint's first album, Tweez), "I Am Not Lonely With Cricket" was recorded in London by Stereolab's Tim Gane, and all other tracks were recorded at Velvetone Music Studio in Louisville, KY, pre-mastered by Konrad Strauss at Chicago Recording Company, and mastered by Nick Webb at Abbey Road Studios.

The image on the mostly black-background cover is a photograph, taken by Valery Yakushev, of a portion of a wall in the Park Of Culture subway station in Moscow.

== Track listing ==
All tracks composed by David Pajo

1. "Arundel" – 1:04
2. "Roadrunner" – 5:10
3. "Pink Holler" – 5:01
4. "Plastic Energy Man" – 5:36
5. "Drunken Spree" – 9:05
6. "Bups" – 1:12
7. "Crowd of One" – 3:35
8. "I Am Not Lonely with Cricket" – 14:55
9. "Knocking the Casket" – 3:32
10. "Up North Kids" – 5:14
11. "Arundel" – 4:36
