= I'll Sleep When You're Dead =

Studio album by El-P
- Released: March 20, 2007
- Studio: Gotham (New York City)
- Genre: Hip-hop
- Length: 55:07
- Label: Definitive Jux
- Producer: El-P

El-P chronology
Collecting the Kid (2004)	I'll Sleep When You're Dead (2007)	Cancer 4 Cure (2012)

Singles from I'll Sleep When You're Dead
- 1. "Everything Must Go" Released: 2006; 2. "Flyentology" Released: 2007

I'll Sleep When You're Dead is the second solo studio album by American hip-hop artist El-P. It was released through Definitive Jux on March 20, 2007. It peaked at number 78 on the Billboard 200 chart, selling about 11,000 copies in its first week. Music videos were created for "Flyentology" and "Smithereens".

== Production ==
Despite his usual dislike of "records that have a bunch of (featuring so and so) after every song title", El-P has explained the more organic nature of the collaborations on I'll Sleep When You're Dead:

My collaborations for the most part come from friendships I have with people who happen to be in the vicinity while I'm making my shit. Little splashes of other peoples voices, talents, energy used in subtle ways is the way I usually like to freak it. Rob does some back ups, Sweeny plays some guitar, Aes drops a verse, James plays some bass... whatever works at the time. It's the South Park theory: when George Clooney appeared on South Park it was as a gay dog. That's the type of shit that makes my day.

El-P has compared the overall sound of the album's music to "a psychedelic Boogie Down Productions record", and like "Scott LaRock and Ced Gee take acid".

The bird on the album's cover is based on a drawing that Alexander Calder made on a wooden toy airplane for El-P as a child.

== Critical reception ==
Professional ratings
Aggregate scores
Source	Rating
Metacritic	80/100
Review scores
Source	Rating
AllMusic	4.5/5 stars
The A.V. Club	B
Entertainment Weekly	B+
The Guardian	3/5 stars
The Independent	5/5 stars
NME	7/10
Pitchfork	8.0/10
Rolling Stone	3/5 stars
Spin	3.5/5 stars
Uncut	4/5 stars

At Metacritic, which assigns a weighted average score out of 100 to reviews from mainstream critics, I'll Sleep When You're Dead received an average score of 80 based on 32 reviews, indicating "generally favorable reviews".

John Bush of AllMusic gave the album 4.5 stars out of 5, calling it "one of the most powerful hip-hop albums of 2007." Dave Heaton of PopMatters gave the album 8 stars out of 10, saying: "The genius of I'll Sleep When You're Dead -- and the reason it deserves to be considered as a progressive step in El-P's journey as an artist -- is that the tracks are just as dense and complex as on his other albums, but in a new, fresh way." Andy Battaglia of The A.V. Club gave the album a grade of B, saying, "nobody makes hip-hop as textured and atmospheric as El-P, and he manages to temper his disorienting noise with soulful suggestions this time out."

Consequence of Sound placed it at number 42 on the "Top 50 Albums of 2007" list.

== Track listing ==
No.	Title	Length
1.	"Tasmanian Pain Coaster" (with Omar Rodríguez-López and Cedric Bixler-Zavala)	6:56
2.	"Smithereens (Stop Cryin)"	4:34
3.	"Up All Night"	2:38
4.	"EMG"	4:33
5.	"Drive"	4:15
6.	"Dear Sirs"	1:34
7.	"Run the Numbers" (with Aesop Rock)	4:43
8.	"Habeas Corpses (Draconian Love)" (with Cage)	4:36
9.	"The Overly Dramatic Truth"	4:32
10.	"Flyentology" (with Trent Reznor)	4:03
11.	"No Kings"	3:07
12.	"The League of Extraordinary Nobodies"	2:36
13.	"Poisenville Kids No Wins / Reprise (This Must Be Our Time)" (with Chan "Cat Power" Marshall)	7:00

== Personnel ==
Credits adapted from liner notes.

- El-P – vocals, production, executive production
- Omar Rodríguez-López – vocals (1)
- Cedric Bixler-Zavala – vocals (1)
- Matt Sweeney – guitar (1)
- Wilder Zoby – synthesizer (1, 7)
- Mr. Dibbs – turntables (1, 2, 7, 8)
- Hangar 18 – vocals (2)
- Mr. Lif – vocals (3)
- Big Wiz – turntables (4)
- Aesop Rock – vocals (7)
- Cage – vocals (8)
- Daniel Kaufman – lute (8)
- Mr. Len – vocals (8)
- Victoria Allen – vocals (8)
- Daryl Palumbo – vocals (9), keyboards (9)
- Camu Tao – vocals (9)
- Trent Reznor – vocals (10), additional production (10)
- Atticus Ross – programming (10)
- Rob Sonic – vocals (10)
- Tame One – vocals (11)
- Joey Raia – vocals (12), recording, mixing
- Slug – vocals (12)
- Murs – vocals (12)
- Chan "Cat Power" Marshall – vocals (13)
- Kareem Bunton – guitar (13)
- Ikey Owens – keyboards (13)
- Michael Sarsfield – mastering
- Brad Smith – layout, design
- Timothy Saccenti – photography
- Amaechi Uzoigwe – executive production
- Jesse Ferguson – project management

== Charts ==
Chart (2007)	Peak position
UK Albums (OCC)	158
UK R&B Albums (OCC)	10
US Billboard 200	78
US Independent Albums (Billboard)	6
US Top R&B/Hip-Hop Albums (Billboard)	55
