= Mike Piscitelli =

American film director

- Born: Los Angeles, California, United States
- Occupations: Music video director, Film director, Photographer, Actor
- Website: www.mikepiscitelli.com

Mike Piscitelli is a director, photographer and actor.

== Filmography ==
=== Music videos ===
- Banks – Drowning
- Bonnie 'Prince' Billy & Matt Sweeney – I Gave You
- Iggy Pop – Little know it all
- J. Cole – Power Trip (featuring Miguel)
- John Frusciante – The past recedes
- Poliça – Tiff (featuring Justin Vernon)
- Van She – Jamaica
- The Bronx – History's Stranglers
- The Bronx – False Alarm
- The Bronx – They will kill us all
- Something Corporate – Space

=== Short films ===
- Waiting For Tomorrow To Wake Up (2013)
- Tomate, A short film for The Elder Statesman (2014)

=== Film ===
- God Bless Ozzy Osbourne (2011)
