= Ride the Fader =

Studio album by Chavez
- Released: November 5, 1996
- Genres: Indie rock, math rock, post-hardcore
- Length: 38:15
- Label: Matador
- Producers: John Agnello; Bryce Goggin; Chavez

Chavez chronology
| Gone Glimmering (1995) | Ride the Fader (1996) | Cockfighters (2017) |

Ride the Fader is the second and final studio album by American indie rock band Chavez. It was released on Matador Records on November 5, 1996. The album is considered by most fans and critics to be the band's best work.

== Critical reception ==
Professional ratings
Review scores
| Source | Rating |
|---|---|
| AllMusic | 4/5 stars |
| The Encyclopedia of Popular Music | 4/5 stars |
| Entertainment Weekly | A |
| The Great Indie Discography | 8/10 |
| MusicHound Rock | 4/5 stars |
| NME | 5/10 |
| Pitchfork | 8.6/10 |
| Tiny Mix Tapes | 5/5 marks |

Andrew Earles, in Gimme Indie Rock: 500 Essential American Underground Rock Albums 1981-1996 (2014), wrote that "Chavez's second album is a gigantic wall of all-encompassing guitar wizardry (riffs, leads, and everything else) constructed over a massive rhythm section and majestic vocals." Entertainment Weekly praised the album as "a fine specimen of spare, brainy post-metal hard rock."

== Track listing ==
1. "Top Pocket Man" - 2:58
2. "The Guard Attacks" - 2:58
3. "Unreal Is Here" - 2:32
4. "New Room - 3:11
5. "Tight Around the Jaws" - 3:22
6. "Lions" - 2:40
7. "Our Boys Will Shine Tonight" - 3:29
8. "Memorize This Face" - 1:45
9. "Cold Joys" - 2:37
10. "Flight '96" - 5:30
11. "Ever Overpsyched" - 2:29
12. "You Must Be Stopped" - 4:43

== Personnel ==
- James Lo - drums
- Scott Marshall - bass
- Matt Sweeney - vocals, guitar
- Clay Tarver - guitar
- Bryce Goggin - co-producer
- John Agnello - co-producer
