= Conan Neutron & the Secret Friends =

American rock band

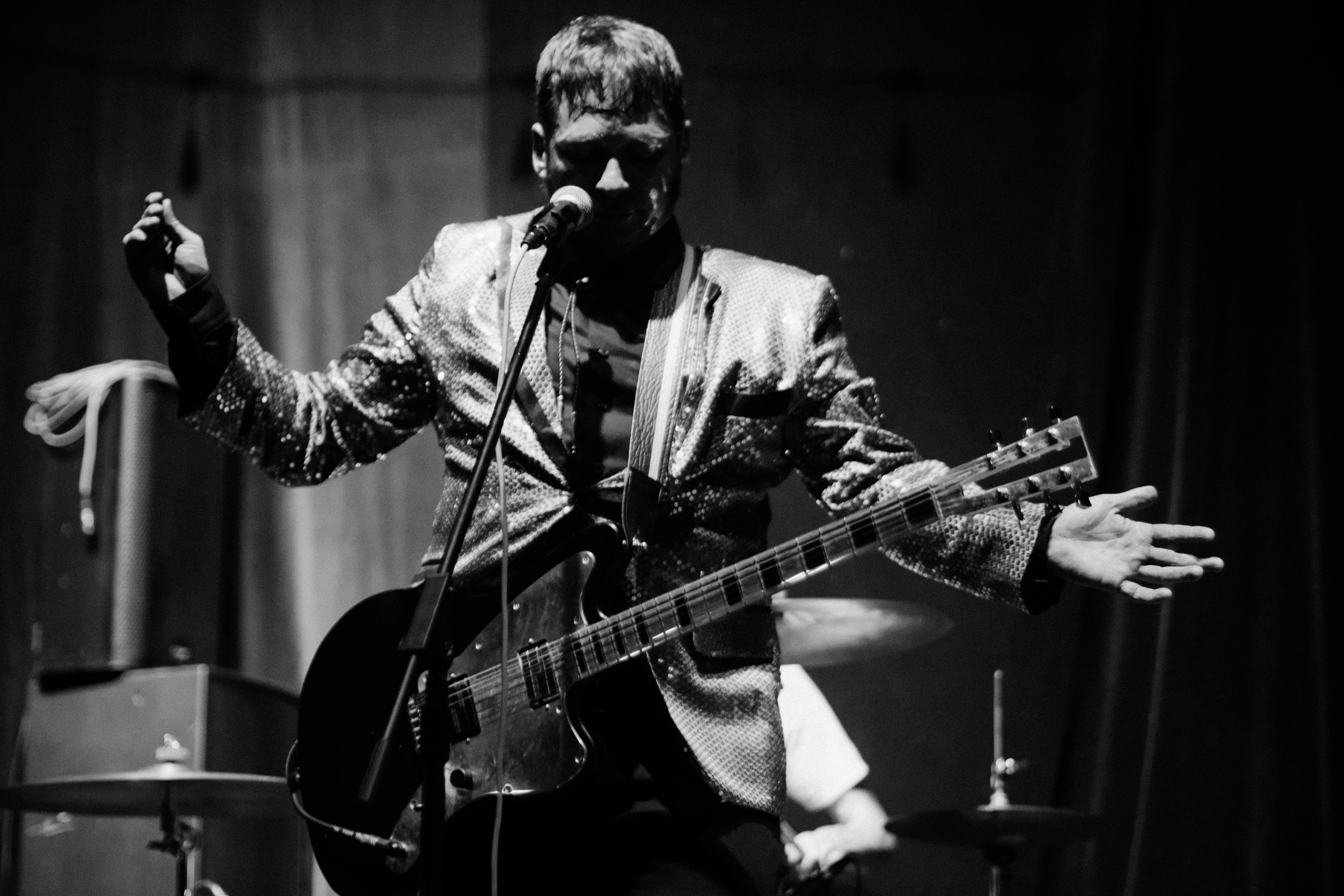

Background information
- Origin: Oakland, California, United States
- Genres: alternative rock; hard rock; experimental rock; Post-punk revival
- Years active: 2014–present
- Labels: Learning Curve Records; Seismic Wave Entertainment
- Formerly of: Replicator; Mount Vicious; Household Gods; Victory and Associates; Trophy Wives; Coliseum
- Members: Current members: Conan Neutron – lead vocals, guitar (2014–present); Tony Ash– bass, vocals (2014–present); Dale Crover – drums, percussion, (2014–present); Live members: Mindee Jorgensen - Drums; Jordan Sobolew – Drums; Nick Erickson – Drums; Chris Bolig – Drums; Jonathan Brown – Drums; Duane Deering - Bass; Loren T - Guitar; Dusty Rose - Guitar; Erica Strout – Guitar; Ryan Werner – Guitar; Michael Marchant – Guitar; Dylan Trost – Guitar; Evan Rowe – Guitar; Chris Williams – Guitar; Joseph Cannon – Guitar; Jason Myles – Guitar; Kevin Seal – Keyboards; Lindsey Charles – Vocals; Steph Donoma – Vocals
- Website: neutronfriends.com

Conan Neutron & the Secret Friends is a rock band formed in Oakland, California in 2015 by vocalist/guitarist/songwriter Conan Neutron and intended as a vehicle for his songwriting. Featuring Melvins drummer Dale Crover on drums and Tony Ash on bass and with production work by Toshi Kasai, their style is influenced by classic rock, noise rock and post-punk, and the live shows feature a revolving cast of players. They are a touring act predominately based in Wisconsin.

== Band name ==
Although the first record was produced in secret, the band's name is in fact a reference to the comic series The Maxx by Sam Kieth and the concept of a "Secret Friend".

A 'secret friend' is somebody in high school, an artist, or free spirit or deviant that the jock or popular kid recognizes is somebody special but will not publicly acknowledge being friends with due to social pressure. The same person that will likely go on to do great things in the future, but in the cloistered lair of high school popularity is a "freak, nerd or weirdo." who associating with lowers one social capital.

== History ==
The band revealed itself to the world in January 2015, releasing a full-length record entitled The Enemy of Everyone, a 9-song full length that featured guest vocals by Eugene Robinson of Oxbow on the song "Fight Math". the record was dedicated to Neutron's friend Clay Wofford. R.I.P. (1977–2014), it was produced and engineered by Toshi Kasai at the Sound of Sirens studio.

2016 brought the release of the second record Art of Murder. A record directly inspired by the Hannibal Lecter series of books by Thomas Harris. Red Dragon, Silence of the Lambs and Hannibal and the interpersonal dynamics between the characters within. As well as some of the other associated material around the characters of said stories. The band cites that "Certain phrases are cited in the lyrical content and are done so with the utmost respect and admiration." It was once again produced and engineered by Toshi Kasai at Sound of Sirens.

The song "Avid Fan" was premiered on the website I Heart Noise on February 23, 2016, featuring backup vocals by Buzz Osborne of the Melvins, the critical reception was positive. Sporadic live appearances of the band began in 2016 in cities such as Chicago, Louisville, Oakland, San Francisco and elsewhere in a "UFO like appearance schedule" On September 17, 2016 Neutron gave an interview with Shiny Grey Monotone where he likened the band lineup to comic book heroes The Avengers.

Further national touring ensued, as well as several single releases. this was followed by a relocation to Wisconsin by core members Tony Ash and Conan Neutron.

On August 6, 2017 a digital single entitled "Conversion" was released in conjunction with Bandcamp's day of action for Trans Rights, the song sung by Transgendered singer Ashley Altadonna of the Glacial Speed consists of lyrical matter directly related to conversion therapy, a pseudo-scientific practice that tries to change an individual's sexual orientation using psychological or spiritual interventions.

These songs were later issued on as part of a digital B-Sides ep entitled "Perfectly Reasonable Deviations From the Beaten Track" along with a cover of the Detroit band Death.

2018 and 2019 brought the next set of Conan Neutron & the Secret Friends releases, a series of split singles entitled "Protons and Electrons. Ensuing "Protons and Electrons" tours covered the Mountain West and Pacific Northwest followed by additional national and international touring in the Midwest, East Coast and Canada, mid-west and West Coast regions and more releases of these singles, including an addition on bandcamp "New and Notable" for the song Jilted dragon, followed by a video A longer run of dates, including New York City, SE Canada, west coast, mid-west and select areas of the south accompanied the release of the Protons and Electrons 2 X LP/2 X CD compilation of the singles. The compilation was largely well received one review stating:

"The big point here is that each of these Neutronian tracks are singular events, tirades of sharply cut and intentionally faceted perspective each attempting to see light by way of precarious manipulated shadows, the full listen is inspired and ‘lost’ in its own head to great effect."

Further media appearances included appearances on Live From the Barrage, TOMORROW WE DIE!, and The Operative, where he discussed small scale corollaries with the band and both Nick Cave as well as the work of the Birthday Party (Band), Grinderman, and Nick Cave and the Bad Seeds.

The band started off 2020 with scheduled touring, including the No Coast 2020 fest in Arlington, TX and others, but like all bands, the tour was cut short and subsequently cancelled due to COVID-19 global pandemic. This was discussed in multiple media appearances as well as Neutron's participation in the band Household Gods with David Pajo of Slint, Vern Rumsey of Unwound and Lauren K. Newman.

The third record Dark Passengers, produced with Toshi Kasai was released on Learning Curve Records. Several songs were premiered in various outlets to positive reception, mostly noting the darker tone of the songs subject matter. Described as: "A concept record about depression, imposter complex and other mental health issues."

In April 2021, Neutron appeared on The Watt from Pedro Show and announced that new material was forthcoming. 2022 revealed this to be the split ep Dangerous Nomenclature with Chicago's Erratic Retaliator Strategy and 2023's Adult Prom, a split LP with the Cincinnati, Ohio band Lung, both once again released on Learning Curve Records.

2023-2025 involved heavy US touring with Mclusky, Lung and others, and the release of the fourth LP The Way of the Neutron.. A tour of Japan, as well as many US tours ensued, as well as other high profile support slots. 2026 included more touring on the record, including direct support with Redd Kross for a tour of the US.

== Music style ==
Conan Neutron & the Secret Friend's music style has been compared to the likes of Cheap Trick, Queens of the Stone Age, Afghan Whigs and The Minutemen among others, often with references to both Modern rock, Power Pop, Noise-rock and Classic rock as musical touch points.

== Live performance ==
Live performances by Conan Neutron & the Secret Friends feature a number of different lineups, in an interview with the Milwaukee Record, this point was clarified citing drummer Crover's busy Melvins schedule as the reason behind the shifting lineups and a desire to work flexibly.

Live reviews often reference that there is rock and roll music being played and express the opinion that the show is entertaining and worthwhile.

"There never seemed to be a moment when Neutron was off — a perpetual showman in the best way. Conan Neutron & the Secret Friends proved that not all class clowns and creative thinkers were silenced by the Ritalin-dispensing '90s. Some of them still hit the stage and play rock music." A human wrecking ball comprised of sequined jackets, sweat, and song, Neutron has an enthusiasm on stage that is more than infectious, it's downright plague-inducing – incurable, unstoppable.

== Podcast ==
Conan Neutron is also the host of the Conan Neutron's Protonic Reversal podcast.

== Discography ==
Year	Title	Label
2015	The Enemy of Everyone	Seismic Wave Entertainment SW013
2016	The Art of Murder	Seismic Wave Entertainment SW014
2017	Perfectly Reasonable Deviations from the Beaten Track	online only
2019	Protons and Electrons Compilation	Seismic Wave Entertainment SW027
2020	Dark Passengers	Learning Curve Records LCR077-1
2022	Dangerous Nomenclature	Learning Curve Records LCR-080-1
2023	Adult Prom	Learning Curve Records LCR-090-1
2025	The Way of the Neutron	Seismic Wave Entertainment SW036
