= Focus Level =

Studio album by Endless Boogie
- Released: June 17, 2008
- Recorded: Rare Book Room; Stanton Attorney
- Genre: Blues rock
- Length: 79:02
- Label: No Quarter
- Producer: Nicolas Vernhes

Endless Boogie chronology
| Focus Level (2008) | Full House Head (2010) |

Focus Level is the debut studio album by American rock band Endless Boogie. It was released on June 17, 2008 through No Quarter Records.

== Critical reception ==
Professional ratings
Review scores
| Source | Rating |
|---|---|
| Allmusic | 4/5 stars |
| Drowned in Sound | 8/10 |
| Pitchfork | 6.8/10 |

Focus Level generally received positive reviews from music critics. Allmusic critic Tim Forget noted the influences of "the heavy Texas rumble of ZZ Top, the Woodstock noodling of Canned Heat, and the brown acid haze of Blue Cheer," stating that the album's pleasures rest in "the band’s ability to crawl inside these sounds and explore them." Noel Gardner of Drowned in Sound commented:"Endless Boogie’s industrial strength record shelves are raided hungrily and consistently throughout Focus Level." Pitchfork critic Aaron Leitko described the album as "rock minimalism at its most casual-- austere repetition and art noise that's good for both the bong-water soaked psych-cognoscenti and the chili cook-off." Leitko further wrote: "The four-sided record is the hallmark of classic-rock over-indulgence, and the extension of that indulgence is Endless Boogie's whole show. But it can be a hard show to sit through." John Mulvey of Uncut wrote: "There’s a real sense that Endless Boogie have exploited the affinities between fiercely disciplined, linear southern jams and motorik."

== Track listing ==
1. "Smoking Figs In The Yard" – 7:23
2. "The Manly Vibe" – 9:39
3. "Bad River" – 3:02
4. "Executive Focus" – 11:34
5. "Gimme The Awesome" – 5:21
6. "Steak Rock" – 7:28
7. "Coming Down The Stairs" – 5:17
8. "Jammin' With Top Dollar" – 10:21
9. "Low-Lifes" – 16:19
10. "Move Back!" – 2:38

== Personnel ==
Endless Boogie

- Paul "Top Dollar" Major – vocals, guitar
- Jesper "The Governor" Eklow – guitar
- Marc Razo – bass
- Chris Gray – drums

Technical personnel

- Nicolas Vernhes – recording, production
- Mike Fellows – additional recording
