= Matt Sweeney =

American musician

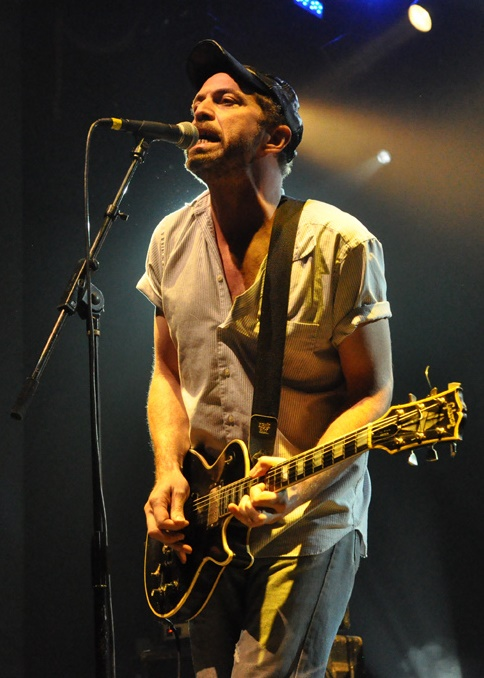
- Sweeney performing with Chavez in 2011

Background information
- Born: July 2, 1969 (age 57); New York City, United States
- Genres: Rock
- Occupations: Musician, Songwriter, Record Producer
- Instruments: Guitar, Vocals, Bass
- Years active: 1989–present
- Labels: Twin-Tone; Drag City; Matador
- Member of: Skunk; Chavez; Zwan; The Hard Quartet

Matt Sweeney (born July 2, 1969) is an American musician, songwriter, and record producer. Sweeney plays with The Hard Quartet. Sweeney is also the host of the web series Guitar Moves.

Sweeney’s history includes being the frontman for the band Chavez, half of the Superwolf duo, composer and performer for music in Red Dead Redemption 2, and session guitarist for Rick Rubin.

== Early life and education ==
Sweeney was born in New York City. His father was John D. Sweeney, a professor of Medieval English at Seton Hall University who was also an avid musician. His mother, Katharine Sweeney Hayden, is a federal judge. Sweeney's parents divorced after 20 years of marriage. He has an older brother, Gregory Sweeney, who is a musician who works on the TV show Kitchen Nightmares.

He grew up in Maplewood and South Orange, New Jersey. He attended Northwestern University before dropping out and moving to New York City.

== Career history ==
Sweeney's high school band Skunk released two albums on Twin/Tone records ("Last American Virgin" in 1989 and the posthumous "Laid", both out of print).

In 1993 Sweeney formed the indie rock band Chavez. The band quickly gained a following in the New York underground scene after the release of their first single ("Repeat the Ending" b/w "Hack the Sides Away") followed by the album (1995's Gone Glimmering and EP (1995’s Pentagram Ring) on Matador Records. The music video for the song “Break Up Your Band” aired in an episode of MTV’s Beavis and Butt-Head. Chavez’s second full-length album Ride the Fader was released in 1996.

Chavez did several short tours in the United States and Europe between 1994 and 1997.

During this time, Sweeney was a crucial early advocate of Guided by Voices sharing their early cassettes amongst his peers including Kurt Cobain. With Chavez on hiatus, Sweeney filled in on bass guitar for the band’s "Under the Bushes, Under the Stars" tour. He also provided vocals on the song "Quicksilver" on Guided By Voices leader Robert Pollard's first solo album Not in My Airforce LP.

The late '90s found him continuing to work a day job and touring with Bonnie 'Prince' Billy as a guitarist.

Sweeney's work has taken him across a variety of musical genres. Starting in 2000 he turned up on Cat Power's The Covers Record and a couple of Bonnie "Prince" Billy singles.

In 2001 he started playing and writing with Billy Corgan and Jimmy Chamberlin in what was to become Zwan. He collaborated with Billy Corgan on the soundtrack to the movie Spun, singing the movie's opening song, a cover of Iron Maiden's "Number of the Beast". He was also featured as a guitarist and backing vocalist on Bonnie "Prince" Billy's Ease Down The Road album.

He lent a helping hand to Dave Grohl in assembling the all-star heavy metal album Probot, tracking down the legendary singers and providing guitar work (the Probot album was not released until 2004, on Southern Lord records).

After Zwan's breakup, Sweeney played guitar with Bonnie "Prince" Billy for several tours in 2004. January 2005 saw the release of their collaboration Superwolf on Drag City. Sweeney and Bonnie toured behind the Superwolf record in the U.S. and Europe.

2005 also saw Sweeney producing heavy metal band Early Man's debut album, Closing In. The following year found Sweeney working in both the country music and hip-hop scenes, providing guitar work, along with Mike Campbell and Smokey Hormel, on the Johnny Cash album American V: A Hundred Highways and appearing with Yo La Tengo bass player James McNew and Def Jux founder El-P, as guest artists on the first track of rapper Cage's album Hell's Winter. He also played guitar on the Dixie Chicks' Taking the Long Way album. In addition, he became a member of apocalyptic Christian folk legends Current 93's touring group, playing shows in Europe in support of the Black Ships Ate The Sky album. He also recorded Andrew W.K. for W.K.'s Close Calls With Brick Walls album.

In 2007 Sweeney again collaborated with El-P, this time alongside Omar Rodríguez-López and Cedric Bixler-Zavala of Mars Volta, on El-P's 2007 album, I'll Sleep When You're Dead.

In early 2009 Sweeney formed The Brill Sisters with Andrew W.K. and producer Don Fleming. They played their first show (without Fleming) at Santos Party House on April 2, 2009. The entire group performed on April 21.

In 2016, Sweeney toured with Iggy Pop, Josh Homme as well as Matt Helders to support their album Post Pop Depression.

In 2021 Sweeney teamed up with Iggy Pop again releasing their cover of “European Son” for the album I’ll Be Your Mirror: A Tribute to The Velvet Underground & Nico.

That same year Sweeney partnered with Bonnie “Prince” Billy with the release of their record Superwolves.

In 2024, Sweeney founded the band The Hard Quartet with Stephen Malkmus, Jim White, and Emmett Kelly.

In 2025 Sweeney toured the world supporting the debut album by The Hard Quartet. He has spent his life as a semi-regular member of Endless Boogie.

=== Production work ===
Sweeney’s production work includes albums by

- The Hard Quartet
- Joanna Sternberg
- Viagra Boys
- Endless Boogie
- Turbonegro
- Dax Riggs
- Baby Dee
- Songhoy Blues
- Early Man
- Garcia Peoples
- Country Westerns

=== Collaborations ===
Matt Sweeney has collaborated with a number of other artists, including:

- Adele
- Cat Power
- Billy Gibbons
- Run the Jewels and El-P
- Current 93
- Dixie Chicks
- Six Organs of Admittance
- Josh Homme
- Andrew W.K.
- Jake Bugg
- Blake Mills
- Tinariwen
- Iggy Pop
- Stephen Malkmus
- Margo Price
- Kurt Vile
- Viagra Boys
- Rub n Tug
- Mark Ronson and Ryan Gosling
- Cass McCombs
- Eyedress

In tune with his many collaborations, an unlikely combination of Sweeney and Neil Diamond was proposed by seminal producer Rick Rubin in 2008 to follow up Diamond's Rubin-produced 2005 album 12 Songs. The 2008 album Home Before Dark, released on May 12, features Sweeney on all songs.

=== Guitar Moves ===
Matt Sweeney is also the host of the web series Guitar Moves created in 2013 in which he interviews many popular guitarists with a focus on showing and teaching their guitar techniques.

Sweeney has interviewed prominent guitarists such as Keith Richards of The Rolling Stones, Billy Gibbons of ZZ Top, St. Vincent, Josh Homme of Queens of the Stone Age and many others.

Sweeney describes Guitar Moves as “a loose anti-authoritarian music ‘show and tell’ designed to inspire anyone to pick up a guitar”.

The series was produced by Vice's music channel Noisey from 2013 until 2017. Guitar Moves is now run independently of VICE with new episodes being uploaded to YouTube and the Guitar Moves website as of November 2025.

== Discography ==
=== Skunk ===
- Last American Virgin (1989) Twin/Tone
- Laid (1990) Twin/Tone

=== Chavez ===
- Gone Glimmering (1995) Matador
- Ride The Fader (1996) Matador
- Better Days Will Haunt You best-of compilation CD/DVD (2006) Matador
- Repeat the Ending EP (1994) Matador
- Pentagram Ring EP (1995) Matador
- What's Up Matador? feat. "Theme from 'For Russ'" (1995) Matador
- School House Rock feat. "Little Twelve Toes" (1996) Atlantic Records
- Boys Making Music, Music Making Men Documentary VHS (1996) Matador
- Cockfighters EP (2017) Matador

=== Zwan ===
- Spun (Motion Picture Soundtrack) (2002)
- Mary Star of The Sea (2003) Warner Bros.

=== Matt Sweeney & Bonnie 'Prince' Billy ===
- Superwolf (2005) Drag City
- I Gave You (2005) EP Drag City
- The Seedling Soundtrack feat. "Demon Lover" (2006)
- Must Be Blind/Life In Muscle (2011) single Drag City
- Superwolves (2021) Drag City

=== The Hard Quartet ===
- The Hard Quartet (2024) Matador
- Lies/Something You Can Do (2025) Matador

=== Production ===
- Probot – by Probot – executive producer Sweeney (2004) Matador
- Closing In – by Early Man – produced by Sweeney (2005) Matador
- We Sing of Only Blood or Love – by Dax Riggs – produced by Sweeney (2007) Fat Possum
- Safe Inside the Day – by Baby Dee – produced by Sweeney with Bonnie 'Prince' Billy (2008) Drag City
- Focus Level – by Endless Boogie – uncredited production by Sweeney (2008) No Quarter
- Full House Head – by Endless Boogie – uncredited production by Sweeney (2010) No Quarter
- Sexual Harassment – by Turbonegro – produced by Sweeney (2012) Volcom Entertainment
- Optimisme – by Songhoy Blues – produced by Sweeney (2020) Transgressive Records
- I'll Be Your Mirror: A Tribute to The Velvet Underground & Nico – "European Son" produced by Sweeney (2021)
- Forgive The City – by Country Westerns – produced by Sweeney (2023) Fat Possum

=== Other collaborations ===
- The Covers Record – by Cat Power – featuring Sweeney on guitar (2000) Matador
- Spun motion picture soundtrack feat. "Number of the Beast" uncredited w/ William Corgan
- Ease Down the Road – by Bonnie 'Prince' Billy – featuring Sweeney on guitar, vocals (2001) Palace Records
- American V: A Hundred Highways – by Johnny Cash – featuring Sweeney on guitar (2006) American Recordings
- Taking the Long Way – by The Dixie Chicks – featuring Sweeney on guitar (2006) Columbia
- Close Calls with Brick Walls – by Andrew W.K. – featuring Sweeney on guitar, vocals (2007) Universal Japan
- I'll Sleep When You're Dead – by El-P – featuring Sweeney on guitar (2007) Def Jux
- Hell's Winter – by Cage Kennylz – featuring Sweeney on guitar (2005) Def Jux
- Home Before Dark – by Neil Diamond – featuring Sweeney on guitar (2008) American Recordings
- Shelter from the Ash – by Six Organs of Admittance – featuring Sweeney on guitar (2008) Drag City
- Jukebox – by Cat Power – featuring Sweeney's guitar on "Song to Bobby" (2008) Matador
- Birth Canal Blues Live – by Current 93 – featuring Sweeney on guitar (2008) Durtro
- Leaving on a Mayday – by Anna Ternheim – featuring Sweeney on guitar on "Terrified", "Losing You", "Off the Road" and "Black Sunday Afternoon" (2008) Universal
- Aleph at Hallucinatory Mountain – by Current 93 – featuring Sweeney on guitar (2009) Durtro
- Cherish the Light Years – by Cold Cave – featuring Sweeney on bass guitar on "The Great Pan is Dead" (2011) Matador
- 21 – by Adele (2011) XL
- Run the Jewels – by Run the Jewels – additional guitar on "No Come Down" (2013) Fool's Gold
- Shangri La – by Jake Bugg – Rhythm Guitar on all tracks (2013) Mercury (UK)/Island (U.S.)
- Run the Jewels 2 – by Run the Jewels – additional guitar on "All My Life" (2014) Mass Appeal
- False, True, Love – 2014 Whitney Biennial short film with Emily Sundblad, Sweeney, and Mariko Munro that features a cover version of the Shirley Collins song "False True Love"
- "Emmar" by Tinariwen (2014) guitar
- "Zipper Down" by Eagles of Death Metal (2015) additional guitar
- "Digging for Windows" by Zack de la Rocha (2016) additional guitar
- Elwan by Tinariwen (2017) additional guitar
- "Vols. 11 & 12" for The Desert Sessions (2019)
- Traditional Techniques by Stephen Malkmus (2020)
- RTJ4 – by Run the Jewels – additional vocals, performer, and guitar on "A Few Words for the Firing Squad (Radiation)"
- I'll Be Your Mirror: A Tribute to The Velvet Underground & Nico – bass guitar and electric guitars on "European Son" with Iggy Pop (2021)
- Blind Date Party — by Bill Callahan & Bonnie "Prince" Billy — additional guitar on "OD'd in Denver" (2021) Drag City
- The Music Of Red Dead Redemption 2: The Housebuilding EP — with David Ferguson (2021)
