= Endless Boogie (band) =

American rock band

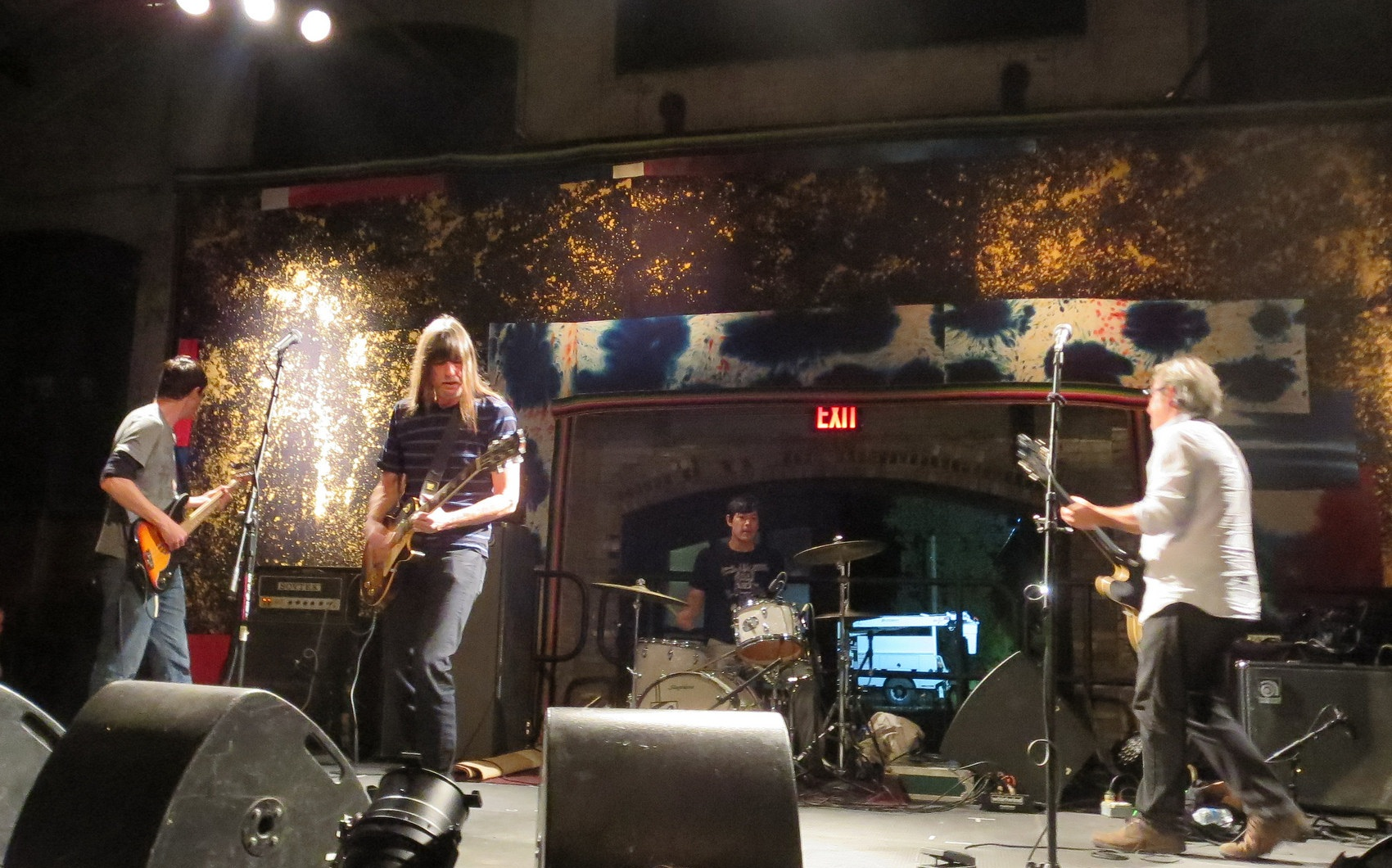
- Endless Boogie performing at Basilica Soundscape festival in 2014

Background information
- Origin: Brooklyn, New York City, New York, U.S.
- Genres: Blues rock; psychedelic rock; stoner rock; hard rock
- Years active: 1997–present
- Labels: Mound Duel; No Quarter
- Members: Paul Major; Jesper Eklow; Marc Razo; Harry Druzd
- Past members: Chris Gray

Endless Boogie is an American rock band, formed in 1997 in Brooklyn, New York. The current line-up of the band consists of Paul Major (vocals, guitar), Jesper Eklow (guitar), Marc Razo (bass) and Harry Druzd (drums). The band takes its name from John Lee Hooker's 1971 album of the same name.

The band is known for "its minimalist jams both onstage and on record."

== History ==
The band was formed in 1997 by Matador Records employees and a professional record collector for jamming. Initially having no plans to record or to tour, the band played their first live show in 2001 as an opening act for Pavement's Stephen Malkmus. After releasing a pair of rare vinyl LPs from 2005, the band released the albums Focus Level in 2008 and Full House Head in 2010. Touring with bands such as Dungen and Circle, the band released their fourth album, Long Island in 2013.

== Musical style ==
The band's style has been labeled as hard rock, psychedelic rock, stoner rock and blues rock. The band's minimalist musical style also attributes krautrock influences, being described as "classic-rock-meets-krautrock" and " repetitive, one-chord riff-rock." The band described their musical style as "Kraut Southern rock."

The band's style also has been compared to those of ZZ Top, AC/DC, Teenage Head-era Flamin’ Groovies, Canned Heat, Amon Düül, Can, The Groundhogs, The Stooges and the Velvet Underground. Tom Hughes of The Guardian described Major's vocals as being "somewhere between a John Lee Hooker drawl and a Captain Beefheart honk."

== Band members ==
Current members

- Paul "Top Dollar" Major – vocals, guitar
  - Paul Major was born in Louisville, Kentucky, in 1954, and is an author and known record collector. After stints playing in bands in St. Louis and Los Angeles, he moved to New York in 1978 and spent the next few years embroiled in the city’s explosive punk scene (most notably as part of the proto-speed metal band the Sorcerers). Paul began a mail-order LP business and would become known in the subculture for his record collecting before joining Endless Boogie at its formation in 1997. In 2017 he authored the Coffee table book “Feel the Music: The Psychedelic Worlds of Paul Major“.
- Jesper "The Governor" Eklow – guitar
- Marc Razo – bass
- Harry Druzd – drums

Former members

- Chris Gray – drums

== Discography ==
Studio albums

- Focus Level (2008)
- Full House Head (2010)
- Twenty Minute Jam Getting Out Of The City (2011)
- Long Island (2013)
- Vibe Killer (2017)
- Admonitions (2021)

EPs and singles

- "Swedish Pizza" (2012)
- Matinicus EP (2013)
- Split Single (2020)

Compilations

- The Skinless Ogress Revolution, Which Feeds On Human Sacrifice (2011)

Other releases

- Volume 1 (2005)
- Volume 2 (2005)
