= Superwolf =

Studio album by Bonnie "Prince" Billy and Matt Sweeney
- Released: January 25, 2005
- Length: 43:53
- Label: Drag City
- Producers: Paul Oldham, Bonnie "Prince" Billy, Matt Sweeney

Bonnie 'Prince' Billy chronology
Sings Greatest Palace Music (2004)	Superwolf (2005)	The Brave and the Bold (2006)

Superwolf is a 2005 collaborative studio album by Bonnie "Prince" Billy and Matt Sweeney. It was released on Drag City.

== Critical reception ==
Professional ratings
Aggregate scores
Source	Rating
Metacritic	80/100
Review scores
Source	Rating
AllMusic	4/5 stars
Cokemachineglow	84%
Dotmusic	8/10
Paste	4/5 stars
Pitchfork	8.4/10
Mojo	3.5/5 stars
Q	4/5 stars
Tiny Mix Tapes	4/5 stars
Uncut	8/10
Under the Radar	8/10

At Metacritic, which assigns a weighted average score out of 100 to reviews from mainstream critics, the album received an average score of 80, based on 17 reviews, indicating "generally favorable reviews".

Pitchfork placed the album at number 21 on the "Top 50 Albums of 2005" list.

In 2007, Spin included Bonnie "Prince" Billy and Matt Sweeney on the "Rock's 25 Greatest Team-ups" list.

== Track listing ==
All lyrics are written by Will Oldham; all music is composed by Matt Sweeney.

No.	Title	Length
1.	"My Home Is the Sea"	5:49
2.	"Beast for Thee"	3:41
3.	"What Are You?"	2:38
4.	"Goat and Ram"	5:15
5.	"Lift Us Up"	2:56
6.	"Rudy Foolish"	4:12
7.	"Bed Is for Sleeping"	2:56
8.	"Only Someone Running"	3:13
9.	"Death in the Sea"	2:38
10.	"Blood Embrace"	7:57
11.	"I Gave You"	2:38

== Personnel ==
Credits adapted from liner notes.

- Bonnie "Prince" Billy – vocals, bass guitar, percussion, Nord Lead
- Matt Sweeney – vocals, guitar, bass guitar, Nord Lead
- Peter Townsend – drums
- Sue Schofield – vocals (on "My Home Is the Sea")

== Charts ==
Chart	Peak position
French Albums (SNEP)	191
