= Early Man (band) =

American heavy metal band

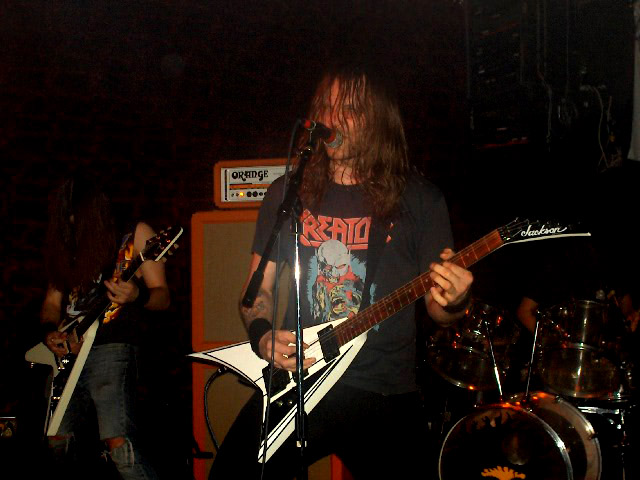
- Early Man in 2006

Background information
- Origin: Columbus, Ohio (early); New York (mid); Los Angeles (later)
- Genres: Heavy metal, speed metal, thrash metal
- Years active: 2003–?
- Labels: Matador, The End
- Members: Mike Conte; Pete Macy
- Website: earlymanarmy.com

Early Man is an American heavy metal/thrash metal duo formed in 2003.

== History ==
Guitarist and vocalist Mike Conte began performing as "Early Man" in the early 2000s. When drummer Adam Bennati moved to New York in 2003, the two formed the nucleus for the current lineup. Influenced by Black Sabbath, Mercyful Fate, Megadeth, Judas Priest, Kreator, Celtic Frost, and early Metallica, they gained the attention of the independent music scene, and released their first EP in early 2005 on Monitor Records. Matador Records signed them and released their debut album, Closing In, in the fall of that year. Lead guitarist Pete Macy joined the band in 2005. The band has used several bass players over the years, and at times will perform without one.

The band left Matador Records and signed with The End Records in 2008. They released the four-song EP Beware the Circling Fin on October 14, 2008, and toured with Iced Earth, High on Fire, 3 Inches of Blood, Toxic Holocaust, Skeletonwitch, and Valient Thorr soon after. Their second album, Death Potion, was recorded and produced by Jack Endino, and released on July 20, 2010. The band did a fall tour with Evile and Bonded by Blood. Before the tour, Bennati left the band. The band has used various touring drummers for live shows.

In July 2011, it was announced that Mike Conte is the composer for a new show debuting on the Cartoon Network called Secret Mountain Fort Awesome. Conte is in charge of all of the music for the show which premiered in the fall of 2011.

== Musical style ==
The band plays a mixture of classic heavy metal and thrash metal, making the music on the album Closing In comparable to works by Metallica, Iron Maiden, and Judas Priest. Conte's vocals on the album were compared to Ozzy Osbourne's. On their second album, Death Potion, the influences of thrash metal became more apparent, leading to comparisons with the early works of Metallica (Kill 'Em All) and Anthrax (Fistful of Metal).

== Discography ==
=== Studio albums ===
- Closing In (October 11, 2005)
- Death Potion (July 20, 2010)
- Thank God You've Got the Answers for Us All (October 10, 2014)

=== Extended plays ===
- 2005: Early Man
- 2008: Beware the Circling Fin
- 2014: Halloween EP 2014
- 2014: You Fancy Me Mad

=== Singles ===
- 2005: Death Is the Answer
- 2008: Tormentor of the Unseen, split 7-inch with Rammer
- 2014: To Mars
- 2016: Uninvited
- 2020: Zeroing In on Me
- 2021: Paper Walls

=== Soundtrack appearances ===
- 2007: "More to Me Than Meat and Eyes", from the film Aqua Teen Hunger Force Colon Movie Film for Theaters
- 2007: "Feeding Frenzy", from the video game MLB 07: The Show
- 2007: "Evil Is", from the video game NHL 2K8
