= David Pajo =

American musician (born 1968)

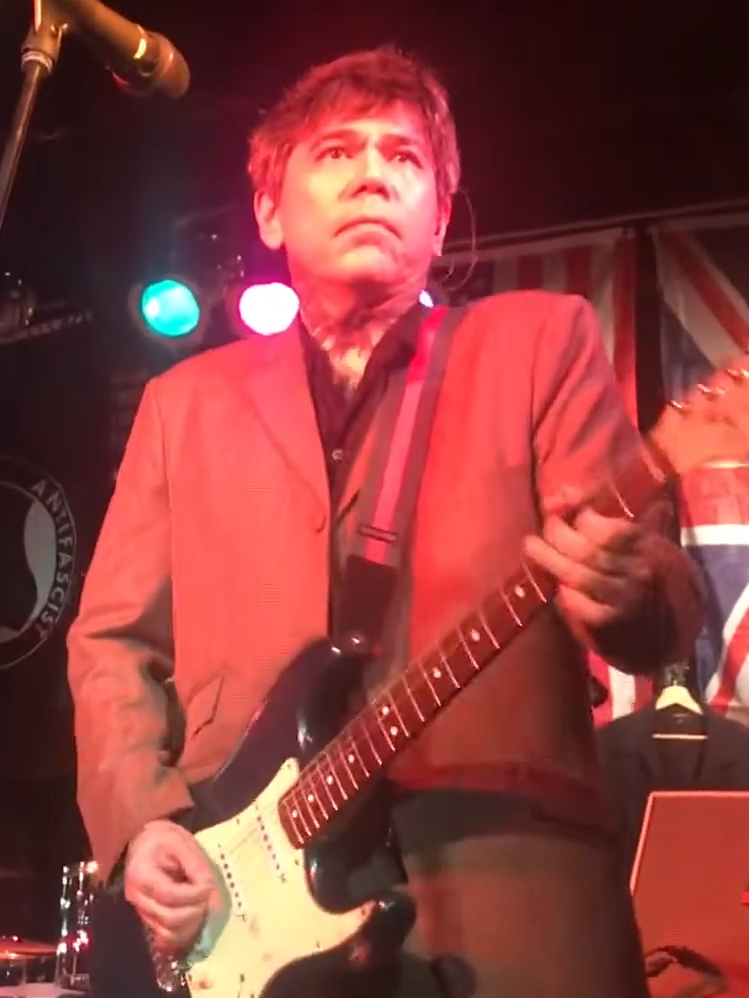
- Pajo performing with Gang of Four in 2022

Background information
- Also known as: Aerial M; Papa M; M, Pajo; Skullfisher
- Born: David Christian Pajo; June 25, 1968 (age 58); Texas, U.S.
- Origin: Louisville, Kentucky, U.S.
- Genres: Alternative rock; indie rock; post-rock; post-hardcore; math rock; slowcore; post-punk
- Instruments: Guitar; bass; banjo; drums; keyboards
- Years active: 1986–present
- Formerly of: Slint; Zwan; Interpol; Tortoise; The For Carnation; Stereolab; Household Gods; Gang of Four

David Pajo (/ˈpɑːhoʊ/ PAH-hoh, born June 25, 1968) is an American musician. He has played a wide variety of music, loosely fitting into several genres such as hardcore punk, math rock, post-rock, electronica, folk rock and indie pop. Though a multi-instrumentalist (including guitar, bass guitar, banjo and drums), he is best known for his guitar work, most notably with Slint.

== Career ==
A native of Louisville, Kentucky, Pajo played with three Louisville hardcore and hardcore-inflected bands in his early career. The first band in which he played was called Obscene Routine, after which he performed as guitarist in Maurice, but it was with Solution Unknown that he made his first recording. He rose to prominence for his work with the influential post-rock band Slint. Since the breakup of Slint, Pajo has contributed to many line-ups, playing and recording with Will Oldham, The For Carnation, Tortoise, Stereolab, Royal Trux, King Kong, Bush League, Zwan, Peggy Honeywell, Yeah Yeah Yeahs, and Interpol.

He has also performed and released music as a solo artist using various monikers, as Aerial M, M, and most notably, Papa M. Among his 7" and splits with various bands, he has released (as Aerial M) 1997's Aerial M, and (as Papa M) 1999's Live from a Shark Cage, 2001's Whatever, Mortal, and 2003's Hole of Burning Alms.

In February and March 2005, he joined his old bandmates from Slint, Britt Walford, Brian McMahan and Todd Brashear for a reunion tour, and in April released his first solo album not bearing a pseudonym, simply entitled Pajo. The follow-up to Pajo, entitled 1968, was released in August 2006.

In mid-2005, he helped to form the band Dead Child, with Todd Cook (from Shipping News, Retsin, The For Carnation, and Aerial M—and who also played guitar on the 2005 Slint reunion tour), Michael McMahan (from The For Carnation, Starkiller, and Phantom Family Halo—and who also joined Slint on the reunion tour), and Tony Bailey (from Anomoanon, The Party Girls, Verktum, Lords, and Aerial M).

In 2009, Pajo joined the Yeah Yeah Yeahs on the tour for their third album, It's Blitz!

He was confirmed to perform as Papa M at the ATP New York 2010 music festival in Monticello, New York in September 2010. In June 2010 it was announced that he would be joining the band Interpol as a tour member. He left the tour early on February 27, 2011.

On February 12, 2015, Pajo attempted suicide after posting a lengthy suicide note on his personal blog. He survived this attempt after EMS members were able to rescue him.

On May 1, 2020, it was revealed that David Pajo was a member of a recording project/band called Household Gods that also consisted of Vern Rumsey of Unwound, Conan Neutron of Conan Neutron & the Secret Friends and Replicator and Lauren K. Newman (LKN) of Palo Verde and LKN Band.

On March 25, 2021, Pajo participated in a group article for the 30th anniversary of Spiderland for Rolling Stone.

Pajo joined Gang of Four for their 2022 North American Tour.

== Discography ==
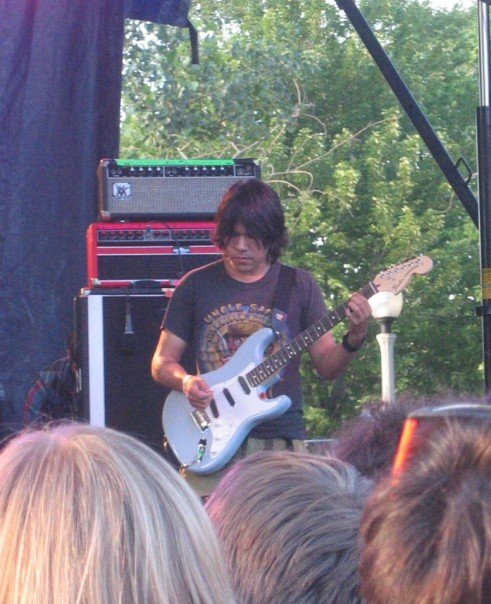
Performing with Slint at the 2007 Pitchfork Music Festival

=== As a part of a band ===
With Bush League

- Fetor EP
- Sicko EP
- Discography (1994)

With the For Carnation

- Fight Songs (April 6, 1995)

With Peggy Honeywell

- Honey for Dinner (May 20, 2003)

With Household Gods

- Palace Intrigue (June 5, 2020)

With King Kong

- Movie Star EP (1990)
- Old Man on the Bridge (1991)

With Will Oldham

- Lost Blues and Other Songs (1993)
- Joya (1997)
- I See a Darkness (1999)
- Ease Down the Road (2001)

With Royal Trux

- 3-Song EP (1998)

With Slint

- Tweez (1989)
- Spiderland (1991)

With Solution Unknown

- Taken for Granted EP (1986)
- Karen LP (1987)
- Louisville Sluggers Compilation EP (1988)
- Atskoo (Full Discography CD) (1996)
- Slint (EP) (1994)

With Tortoise

- Millions Now Living Will Never Die (January 30, 1996)
- TNT (March 10, 1998)

With Zwan

- Mary Star of the Sea (January 28, 2003)

=== As a solo artist ===
M is the Thirteenth Letter

- "Safeless" / "Napoleon" (single) (1995)
- "Vol de Nuit" / "Witchazel" (split single w/Monade) (1996)

Aerial M

- Aerial M (August 25, 1997)
- "M Is" (single) (1997)
- Vivea (compilation EP) (1998)
- "October" (single) (1998)
- Post Global Music (January 26, 1999)

Papa M

- Travels in Constants Vol. 5 (1999)
- 1999 Tour Single (1999)
- Live from a Shark Cage (October 25, 1999)
- Papa M Sings (2001)
- Whatever, Mortal (2001)
- Songs of Mac (2002)
- Three Songs (2002)
- One (2003)
- Two (2003)
- Three (2003)
- Four (2003)
- Five (2004)
- Six (2004)
- Hole of Burning Alms (February 24, 2004)
- Highway Songs (2016)
- A Broke Moon Rises (2018)
- Ballads of Harry Houdini (2024)

Pajo

- Pajo (June 28, 2005)
- 1968 (August 22, 2006)
- Scream with Me (February 24, 2009)

Evila

- Hexes (December 2009)
