= Witkin =

Witkin is a surname. Notable people with the surname include:

- Andrew Witkin (1952–2010), American computer scientist
- Beatrice Witkin (1916-1990), American composer and pianist
- Bernard E. Witkin (1904–1995), American lawyer, founder of the California law treatise Witkin's
- Brian Witkin, American founder of Pacific Records
- Christian Witkin (born 1966), American fashion and portrait photographer
- Evelyn M. Witkin (1921–2023), American geneticist
- Herman Witkin (1916–1979), American psychologist
- Isaac Witkin (1936–2006), South African sculptor
- Jerome Witkin (born 1939), American artist
- Joel-Peter Witkin (born 1939), American photographer
- Morton Witkin (1895–1973), American lawyer and politician
