= Pacific Records =

American music label

Pacific Records is an American, San Diego, California–based music label founded in 2003 as an independent record label and music publisher. Amongst the labels releases are albums by O-Town, Slack Key Ohana and the Guitar Legends television special soundtracks. Helmed by CEO Brian Witkin, a San Diego–based entertainment attorney, the seeds of Pacific Records were planted in 1999, with the opening of Real2Reel Records, at first in his parents' home before relocating in November 2004 to a shop located inside all-ages music venue "The Epicentre" in San Diego's Mira Mesa neighborhood. The shop initially began releasing music under the Real2Reel name, but soon changed to Pacific Records. While the shop closed in June 2007, Pacific Records continued as a label. Witkin signed both local and national talent from the beginning, including San Diego's Get Back Loretta and Virginia based, Life's Only Lesson. A short time after, the imprint was acquired by Wingnut Media Group, Inc, based in Del Mar, California, soon transferred to Georgi Entertainment, LLC. In 2009 Witkin purchased the company back under the holding company New Pacific Group, currently, Pacific Records, Inc. The label includes in house recording studios, engineering marketing and distribution.

== History ==
=== 2010–2015 ===
In 2014 Pacific Records began booking the VIP Lounge at the then Valley View Casino Center, showcasing their talent roster prior to the mainstage headliners. The arrangement has continued through the venue's name change to Pechanga Arena. In 2015 Pacific Records produced and released the “San Diego Gulls Anthem,” the official song of the San Diego–based hockey team, San Diego Gulls.

=== 2016–2019 ===
In 2017, the label released its first soundtrack, for the film 9/11, starring Charlie Sheen. That same year, Pacific Records released the final recording from Motörhead frontman, Lemmy Kilmister, with Chris Declercq, “We Are the Ones.” In August 2019 the label released The O.T.W.N Album from a reunited O-Town, with the band performing lead track, “Off”, on CBS-TV's The Late Late Show with James Corden Meanwhile, in November 2019 the label hosted a showcase stage aboard the Marrietta Ferry at the inaugural Wonderfront Music and Arts Festival in San Diego. Pacific Records also released the soundtrack to the live television special, Guitar Legends III, recorded at the same Wonderfront Festival, featuring Billy Gibbons, Warren Haynes, Nancy Wilson, George Thorogood and Steve Lukather.

=== 2020–2022 ===
In October 2020, the label released the debut album from the Original Starfires, featuring latter day, New Mamas and Papas singer Laurie Beebe Lewis and singer Eli Holland, as well as a collaborative single, “Bad Wolves” featuring Rebecca Jade, Grammy winner Jason Mraz, Miki Vale and Veronica May. The song takes a stand against racism, with a video shot at the House of Pacific Relations International Cottages, located in San Diego's Balboa Park, ultimately winning “Song of The Year” at the 2021 San Diego Music Awards (SDMA). That same year Pacific Records signed reggae artist Skyler Lutes also took home an award for “Best Local Recording.” Meanwhile, in 2021 Pacific Records reissued the album Grapefruit Moon by Southside Johnny with LaBamba's Big Band. Also in 2021 label CEO Brian Witkin and musician Kamaka Mullen released a self-titled EP with their Hawaiian themed combo, Slack Key Ohana, winning the “Best World Music Album” category at the 2022 San Diego Music Awards. In 2022 Pacific Records announced a new version of “Don’t Fear The Reaper,” originally by Blue Öyster Cult, as the first in a series of singles produced by Sppike Mike Muellenberg, under the Music's Future banner, as a fundraiser for the San Diego Music Foundation. The collaborative effort includes Mike Watt (Firehose (band)/ The Stooges), Mike Reiter (27 Various / The Dig), Doug Walker (The Dwarves / The Spice Pistols), Bart Mendoza (Manual Scan/ The Shambles (band)), Anna Zinova (Pinkeye), Nick Aguilar (Slaughterhouse), Robbie Allen and Will Lerner (Shake Before Us / Strawberry Moons), with studio production by Jeff Berkley. Since its inception Pacific Records has released music across genres, including pop group O-Town, rockers Sprung Monkey, singer Rebecca Jade and classical guitarist Lito Romero. Recent signings include Emmanuel Kelly, whose single “Red Love” was Executive produced by Coldplay’s Chris Martin, Falling Doves, Kubota, Sandollar, Bart Mendoza, The Josh Rosenblum Band, The Spice Pistols, Jonny Tarr and Chandler Bay.

=== 2023 - ===
In 2023 the label scored two more honors, at the 32nd Annual San Diego Music Awards: "Best World Music Album," Sandollar - Under the Water, and "Best Rock Album," The Tourmaliners - Surfidia.

On January 7, 2024, Pacific Records celebrated their 20th Anniversary with a daylong event, The First Annual Pacific Records Fest, held at the Music Box in San Diego. Coverage of the event included a major feature on the history of the label in the San Diego Union Tribune by George Varga. Meanwhile on July 21, an outdoor mini festival, The Pacific Records Showcase, was held at Kate Sessions Park, as part of the Pacific Beach community Concerts on the Green series.

Amongst the labels releases in 2024, were a single by Izzy Delan featuring Robby Krieger, "Back of My Mind," and albums by new age artist, Kristina Bennett, whose album, Shakti, topped the Spotify new age chart, and Slack Key 'Ohana, Hawaiian Cowboy, which included contributions from Billy Gibbons (ZZ Top) and slack key guitarist George Kahumoku Jr.

In 2024 Pacific Records releases took home four trophies at the 33rd Annual San Diego Music Awards, including "Best Jazz or Blues Album": Shane Hall - Howl and Sway, "Best World Music Song": Slack Key 'Ohana "Nahenahe La Kep O Ka Wahine U’i," and two for Jonny Tarr's album, The Rules: "Best Pop Album" & "Album of the Year."

== Partial discography ==
=== Albums ===
- 2024 Hawaiian Cowboy Slack Key 'Ohana
- 2024 Shakti Kristina Bennett
- 2023 The Rules Jonny Tarr
- 2023 Never Leaving Skyler Lutes
- 2023 Howl & Sway Shane Hall
- 2022 Under the Water Sandollar
- 2022 Spice Train The Spice Pistols
- 2022 A Pacific Records Christmas Various Artists
- 2022 Bad Guy Stuff The Moonjacks
- 2022 Live at Tiki Oasis Slack Key 'Ohana
- 2022 Surfidia The Tourmaliners
- 2022 Green Eyed The Josh Rosenblum Band
- 2020 Rewind Skyler Lutes
- 2020 Tough Stuff Jonny Tarr
- 2019 America Salutes You Presents: Guitar Legends III Various Artists
- 2019 The O.T.O.W.N Album O-Town
- 2019 America Salutes You Presents: Guitar Legends II Various Artists
- 2017 Big Medicine Ryan Hiller
- 2016 Pages of Life Rebecca Jade
- 2015 L.O.V.E. Lindsey Perry
- 2013 Dead Is Dead Sprung Monkey
- 2013 Roller Coaster Ride Sandollar
- 2013 Gamma Rays Social Club
- 2005 Doo Wop and Motown Show Band The Corvettes

=== EPs ===
- 2023 Shooting Stars Manual Scan
- 2022 Off the Ledge Seawall Prophet
- 2021 s/t Slack Key 'Ohana
- 2021 66/68 Bart Mendoza
- 2020 Fly Me Away The Original Starfires
- 2020 s/t The Wildflowers
- 2020 The Coming Home EP Cambrian Shores
- 2017 The Dark Revival Lindsey Perry
- 2014 s/t Lito Romero

=== Singles ===
- 2024 Who Are You Kela Sako
- 2024 You Gotta Know When Charlie Rae
- 2024 "Back of My Mind" izzy delan
- 2023 "Summer" The Moonjacks
- 2023 "Allies" The Spice Pistols
- 2022 "Sk8 Hi" The Moonjacks
- 2021 "Red Love" Emmanuel Kelly featuring Charli Taft
- 2020 "Be My Lover" Falling Doves
- 2020 "Party People" Sandollar
- 2020 "Bad Wolves" Rebecca Jade featuring Jason Mraz, Miki Vale & Veronica May
- 2019 "Something For You" Cambrian Shores
- 2017 "We Are The Ones" Chris Declercq featuring Lemmy Kilmister
