= The Shambles (band) =

American power pop and rock group from San Diego, California

- Origin: San Diego, California
- Genres: Power pop
- Years active: 1990–2019
- Label: various
- Members: Bart Mendoza; Kevin Donaker-Ring; Mark Zadarnowski
- Past members: Ray Brandes; Bill Calhoun; Kenny Howes; Mike Kamoo; David Klowden; David Lizerbram; Victor Penalosa; Ron Silva; Orrick Smith; Joel Valder
- Website: theshambles.net

The Shambles is an American power pop and rock group from San Diego, California.

Formed in 1990 from members of other regional bands, The Shambles have released numerous CDs, LPs and 7-inch singles, have toured extensively in the United States, and performed in the UK (including an appearance at the Marquee Club in London), Mexico, and Spain.

== Members ==
The founding members of The Shambles were guitarist Kevin Donaker-Ring (formerly of Manual Scan), Brad Wilkins formerly of Manual Scan (who came up with the name of the band), Ray Brandes and David Klowden (both formerly of The Tell-Tale Hearts), and bassist Mark Zadarnowski (formerly of The Crawdaddys). Guitarist/singer Bart Mendoza (also from Manual Scan) joined the group a few months later, and when Brandes departed soon after their 1991 U.K. tour, another former Tell Tale Heart, keyboardist Bill Calhoun also joined the group. Klowden departed shortly thereafter followed a year later by Calhoun. Zadarnowski parted ways with the band in 2005, leaving the core of Donaker-Ring and Mendoza.

Following a brief stint from bassist David Lizerbram (formerly of Kite Flying Society), Florida native Kenny Howes (who has performed with Pat DiNizio and is fill in bassist with The Smithereens) joined the group in 2005, alternating between bass guitar and 12-string Rickenbacker, playing his last show with the band on May 1, 2010, before relocating to Dallas, Texas. Since Klowden's departure the groups drum duties have been filled by numerous drummers, including Mike Kamoo (The Stereotypes), Victor Penalosa (The Flamin' Groovies), Joel Valder (Sparkle*Jets U.K.), Todd Woolsey (Static Halo), John Chilson (The Loons) and Ron Silva (The Crawdaddys). The changeover in drummers is something of a running joke amongst the band, who issue an "I Was a Shambles drummer" pin to players.

== Current activities ==
In 2015, the band released a 7-inch 4-track vinyl EP, Radio Daze, on Bickerton Records in Spain, composed of live radio sessions recorded for DJ Tim Pyles and the 91X program, Loudspeaker. In 2016, Spanish television network RTVE included footage of the Shambles in a music documentary series, Cachitos de Hierro y Cromo – in an episode called, YEAH, YEAH!

== Partial discography ==
=== Albums ===
- Clouds All Day (U.S./Blindspot 10, 1996) also issued by: Spain / Snap Records
- Reviving Spark (Japan/1+2 087, 1996)
- What You're Missing (Spain/Snap, 2000) two pressings with different booklets, blue or brown
- Chelsea Smiles and More (Spain/Snap, 2001)
- 20 Explosive Hits (U.S./Black Cherry Music Group, 2008)
- Desde Ayer (U.S./JAM-Blindspot, 2008)
- Live at the Casbah (U.S./Archive Records, 2013)

=== EPs ===
- Original Tangent (US/Gouramie 105,1995) PS EP Blue Vinyl
- (We've Got A) Groovy Thing (UK/Detour 031,1995) PS 7 EP on Black or Yellow Vinyl
- Chelsea Smiles (US/Genuine Article GA-1,1998) 10-inch EP Blue Vinyl
- It Might Rain Tonight (Spain/Snap, 2003)PS 7-inch EP
- Radio Daze – The Pyles Sessions (Spain/Bickerton, 2015)PS 7-inch EP

=== Singles ===
- She's Used To Playing With) Fire / Louise (Susstones 537/PS 45, 1993) also released in the U.S. by Prospective Records
- Nadie Te Quiere Ya (US/Get Hip 195/PS 45, 1997)

=== Soundtracks ===
- OST: A Box Full of Rocks – The El Cajon Years of Lester Bangs (U.S. / Road Ahead, 2014) – It Is and It Isn't (as Jon Kanis & The Shambles)

=== Covers ===
- Forty One Sixty: The Songs of the Shambles (US / JAM-Blindspot 109, 2009) – collects covers of the band's songs including The Lola's, Herb Eimerman, The Happy Losers and Cockeyed Ghost.

=== Compilation appearances ===
- Staring At The Sun Volume 1 (US / Blindspot 001, 1992) - Medley: Of Heart & Soul/For Jamie, Original Tangent, Stuck On The Inside
- Staring at the Sun Volume 2 (U.S. / Blindspot, 1993) Thin Lines, It Is and It Isn't (as Jon Kanis and the Shambles)
- Fish Sauce (U.S./ Gouramie, 1994) - Nothing Can Be Everything
- Sympophony #1 (U.S. / Not Lame, 1995) - The Colour Swirl, I Believe, Medley: Of Heart & Soul / For Jamie, Original Tangent
- Get Ready For The Brincosis: A Tribute to Los Brincos (Spain / Snap, 1996) - Nadie Te Quiere Ya
- The 6th Annual San Diego Music Awards (U.S. / 1996) Rain
- Here Comes The Summer: A Tribute to the Undertones (Spain / Munster, 1996) - It's Going to Happen (vinyl edition) also issued on CD in the U.S. by Square Target
- Three Minute Revolution (U.S. / RPM, 1996) - Delve Into Everything
- The Modern World: A Tribute to The Jam (Japan / Flavour, 1996) - But I'm Different Now (reissued by UK label Rhythm Vicar in 2000)
- Quadrophenia 1996: A Tribute to The Who (Japan / Flavour, 1996) - Is It In My Head (reissued by UK label Rhythm Vicar in 2001)
- Preserved: A Tribute to the Raspberries (U.S. / Ginger 631, 1996) - Might As Well
- Closet Pop Folk (U.S. / Pop Psycle, 1997) - In Your Arms, Chelsea Smiles, Her Black Dress, I Believe, Clouds All Day (all acoustic versions)
- Brinestorm (U.S. / Gouramie 1005, 1997) - Brilliant
- Pop Under the Surface (Sweden / Yesterday Girl 001, 1997) - Child's Play
- The Bam Balam Explosion Volume IV (Spain / Bam Balam 005, 1997) - Delve Into Everything
- 1+2 Sampler (Japan / 1+2, 1998) - I Can't Don't Want To Faster
- Beat Party (Japan / 1+2, 1999) - She's Got Everything
- San Diego Music Awards 1999 (U.S./ 1999) - Change
- Pop Greetings Volume 1: California (Sweden / Yesterday Girl, 2000) - Pretty Well Lit
- Riot on the Rocks 6 (Spain / Safety Pin, 2002) - Leaving Here
- 13th Annual San Diego Music Awards (U.S./2003) Warm This Winter
- Into the Jet Stream of Pop (Canada / Beautiful Music, 2004) - Blindspot
- West of Eden (U.S. / Zip, 2005) - All Sorts
- Dana & Carl presents: This Is Rock 'n' Roll Radio Volume 1 (U.S. / JAM, 2005) - Warm This Winter
- 91X Loudspeaker (U.S. / 91X, 2005) - Child's Play
- Sonic Zirchonia: A Tribute to Neil Diamond (U.S. / Delirium, 2005) - Thank The Lord For The Nighttime
- Shout (U.K. / 2005) I Can't Don't Want To Faster
- Jam On Jeremy: A Tribute to Jeremy (U.S. / JAM, 2005) - It's Getting Better
- Any Time, Any Wave Volume 1 + 2 (Spain / Rock Indiana, 1999) - Does Stephanie Know?
- Someone to Share My Life With: A Tribute to Television Personalities (Sweden / But Is It Art, 2006) - If I Could Write Poetry (vinyl only)
- Five Way Street: A Tribute to Buffalo Springfield (U.S. / Not Lame, 2006) - Whatever Happened to Saturday Night
- Sweet Relief (U.S. / JAM, 2007) - Wendy Never
- The Young Idea: A Tribute to Squire (U.K. / Twist, 2007) - It's A Mod Mod World, Does Stephanie Know
- San Diego Soundscape (U.S. / Convis, 2007) - Change
- Staring at the Sun Volume 5 (U.S. / Blindspot, 2007) - More Than This
- 17th Annual San Diego Music Awards" (U.S./ 2007) All Sorts
- San Diego Indie Music Fest IV (U.S. / 2008) I Can't Don't Want To Faster
- Do You Want To Be In The Show: A Tribute To The Jetset (U.K. / Twist Records, 2009) - Hard To Say Goodbye
- Hearts On Fire (U.S. / JAM, 2010) - Love Is All Around
- Yesterday, Today, Tomorrow (U.S. / Blindspot, 2010)
- Staring at the Sun Volume 8 (U.S. / Blindspot, 2010) - Clouds All Day (live on FM94.9)
- Power Chords, Harmonies and Mistletoe (U.K. / Twist, 2011) - Warm This Winter (reissued in 2013 with updated cover)
- Art Around Adams 2012 (U.S. / Blindspot, 2012) Bears Down The Hill, I Believe
- Sweet Relief 3 (U.S. / JAM, 2013) - All Sorts (alternate version 3)
- 40 Years of Bear Family Records (Germany / Bear Family, 2015) - Wouldn't You Like To Be A Bear?
- Sweet Relief 4 (U.S. / JAM, 2017) - It's Getting Better (remake) (as The Shambles and Jeremy Morris)

=== Magazine / book compilations ===
These are compilations which are only available as part of the featured book or magazine.

- Sounds of Snap! (Spain / 1994) Original Tangent (7-inch Vinyl EP with Snap! Magazine) blue picture sleeve. repressing has a red cover.
- That Sounds Like Fun Volume 1 (Spain / 1994) – Just A Matter of Time (live at the Marquee) (Cassette with Snap! Magazine)
- That Sounds Like Fun Volume 2 – Rock and Roll House (Spain / 1995) – Psychotic Reaction (live) (Cassette with Snap! Magazine)
- The Yellow Pills E.P (U.S. / 1995) – Child's Play (7-inch Vinyl EP with Yellow Pills Fanzine #7)
- That Sounds Like Fun Vol. 3 (Spain / 1996) Harmony (Cassette with Snap! Magazine)
- Blow Up (Spain / 1997) Leaving Here (7-inch Vinyl EP with Blow Up Magazine)
- Uncool Beans (U.S. / 1998) – Blurs Somewhere (CD with Uncool Beans Magazine #9)
- Ansia De Color (Spain / Ansia de Color, 2007) – Fixing A Hole (CD with Ansia de Color 20th Anniversary Issue)
- Heavy Soul (U.K. / Rowed Out, 2011) – Mod Radio UK (CD with Heavy Soul Magazine #9)
- Power Pop Prime Volume 1 (U.S. / PGH, 2012) – Days and Maybes (CD with accompanying book)
- Power Pop Prime Volume 2 (U.S. / PGH, 2013) – Nothing Can be Everything (CD with accompanying book)

=== Other appearances ===
- Ray Brandes – Continental Drifter (Spain / SNAP, 1998) – Louise, What Went Wrong (Recordings by the Shambles on a Ray Brandes solo album)
- Ray Brandes – A Matter of Time: The Best of Ray Brandes (Spain / Party Line, 2007) – Louise, What Went Wrong (Recordings by the Shambles on an anthology of Ray Brandes music)
- Jon Kanis – All American Mongrel Boy (U.S. / Road Ahead, 2014) – It Is and It Isn't (as Jon Kanis with the Shambles)
