= Rag and Bone =

Rag and bone may refer to:

- Rag-and-bone man, a person who collects and sells discarded household items
- Rag & Bone, an American fashion label
- "Rag and Bone" (song), a song by the White Stripes from their 2007 album Icky Thump
- Rag & Bone (album), a 1990 EP by alternative country band The Walkabouts

== See also ==
- Rag'n'Bone Man, English singer songwriter
- Rag and Bone Buffet: Rare Cuts and Leftovers, 1990 compilation album by XTC
- The Rag and Bone Shop, 2001 novel by Robert Cormier
