= Wondertown =

Wondertown may refer to:

- A town from the 1991 Cuban film Alice in Wondertown
- A track from the New West Motel album by alternative rock band The Walkabouts
- A comics series by Fabien Vehlmann
