= The Penetrators =

San Diego punk band (1977-1984)

The Penetrators is an American punk rock and new wave band formed in San Diego, California, in 1977. The group was part of San Diego's early punk and original-music scene and developed a regional following through performances at venues in California.

After disbanding in 1984, the Penetrators periodically reunited for live performances. In 2011, the group received a Lifetime Achievement Award at the San Diego Music Awards. In 2026, they were inducted into the San Diego Music Hall of Fame.

== History ==
The Penetrators were formed Guitarist Scott Harrington and drummer Joel Kmak in San Diego in the late 1970s. Gary Heffern later served as the band's vocalist, while Dan McLain, subsequently known as Country Dick Montana, was one of its drummers.

They made their name opening for The Ramones at Montezuma Hall. With the Penetrators, Heffern played shows with the Unknowns, Dick Dale, the Meat Puppets, the Plimsouls, the Plugz, Jim Carroll, Nina Hagen, Mudhoney the Walkabouts, Iggy Pop, Oingo Boingo, Romeo Void, the B-52s, Robert Gordon, Rubber City Rebels, the Paladins. They also played a memorable show at San Dieguito High School. Eddie Vedder of Pearl Jam attended the show when he was a student there. Penetrator shows had a reputation for riots. Heffern won a Best Fight award in a year end music column once.

In October 1979, the San Diego Reader published a cover story documenting the band during a six-day California tour. The itinerary included performances at the Hong Kong Cafe in Los Angeles, the Fu-Bar in Santa Barbara, Slick Willy's in Sacramento and Mabuhay Gardens in San Francisco.

During the late 1970s and early 1980s, the band performed at San Diego venues associated with the city's punk and new-wave scenes: Adams Avenue Theater, Abbey Road, the Skeleton Club, the North Park Lions Club, Journey, Headquarters and the Spirit Club. Contemporary and retrospective coverage characterized the Penetrators as one of the city's prominent early punk groups. Los Angeles Times stated that the Penetrators and several other local original-music groups regularly attracted capacity audiences at San Diego nightclubs during the early 1980s.

The band released the single "Stimulation" backed with "Sensitive Boy" in 1979, followed by the extended play record Walk the Beat in 1980 and the album A Sweet Kiss from Mommy in 1982.

In 2018, the Penetrators reunited at the Casbah for "Gary Heffern's Last Waltz."
