= See Beautiful Rattlesnake Gardens =

Studio album by the Walkabouts
- Released: 1988
- Genres: Alternative rock, alternative country
- Length: 35:42
- Label: PopLlama
- Producers: The Walkabouts, Tony Kroes, Ed Brooks

The Walkabouts chronology
Linda Evans / Cyclone (1987)	See Beautiful Rattlesnake Gardens (1988)	Cataract (1989)

Professional ratings
Review scores
Source	Rating
AllMusic	3/5 stars

See Beautiful Rattlesnake Gardens is the debut album by American alternative country band the Walkabouts, released in 1988 through PopLlama Records.

== Track listing ==
All tracks written by the Walkabouts, except where noted.

1. "Jumping Off" – 2:59
2. "Breakneck Speed" – 3:07
3. "The Wellspring" – 3:44
4. "John Reilly" – 3:38
5. "Robert McFarlane Blues" – 0:54
6. "This Rotten Tree" – 2:06
7. "Laughingstock" – 3:34
8. "Glass Palace" – 3:01
9. "Feast or Famine" – 4:22
10. "Ballad of Moss Head" – 2:47
11. "Who-Knows-What" – 4:15
12. "Rattlesnake Theme" – 1:15

Weights and Rivers (the bonus tracks) (Glitterhouse re-release, 1993)

13. "Linda Evans" – 4:12
14. "Mai Tai Time" – 2:02
15. "Cyclone" – 3:51
16. "Gather Round" (Arthur Lee) – 4:40
17. "Certain Gift" – 4:05

The length of the Glitterhouse re-release is 54:32 minutes. According to the Glitterhouse re-release CD liner notes the tracks 13–16 were compiled from the unreleased "Weights & Rivers" album. "Linda Evans" b/ w "Cyclone" was originally released as a 7" single by Necessity Records (Spring 1987, S001). "Certain Gift" appeared originally on the compilation Sounds of Young Seattle, Vol. II (Dust Bunnie/Necessity, Spring 1986) on cassette only. The re-release was released on September 17, 1993.

== Personnel ==
- Michael Wells – bass, harmonica, vocals
- Carla Torgerson – vocals, guitar, keyboard, cello
- Grant Eckman – drums, percussion
- Chris Eckman – vocals, guitar, moss organ

Additional musicians

- Terry Lee Hale – lead guitar on "This Rotten Tree", acoustic lead guitar on "Gather Round"
- Alan Goodman – lap steel guitar on "Jumping off"
- Nancy Clark – violin on "Breakneck Speed"
- Tony Kroes – noise and treatments (according to the Glitterhouse re-release CD liner notes)
- Curt Eckman – bass on "Certain Gift"
- Dylan Thomas – voice over on "Certain Gift"

The Glitterhouse re-release CD liner notes also mention a "cast of Belltown drunks" (including Gary Heffern) on backup vocals on "Gather Round".

Technical

- The Walkabouts – production
- Tony Kroes – production on all tracks, engineering on "Certain Gift"
- Ed Brooks – production & engineering on 1–12
- Bruce Calder – production & engineering on "Linda Evans", "Mai Tai Time", "Cyclone" "Gather Round"
- Ben Thompson – Cover design, lettering, and photography
- Chris Peters – Cover woodcut
