= Satisfied Mind =

Studio album by the Walkabouts
- Released: 1993
- Recorded: September 1993
- Studios: Avast, Seattle
- Genres: Alternative country; folk rock; indie folk; Americana
- Length: 59:26
- Labels: Sub Pop; Glitterhouse
- Producers: Kevin Suggs; the Walkabouts

The Walkabouts chronology
| New West Motel (1993) | Satisfied Mind (1993) | Setting the Woods on Fire (1994) |

Satisfied Mind is the sixth album by American rock band the Walkabouts, released in 1993 on Sub Pop. It consists entirely of covers of roots music and compositions by modern singer-songwriters, including songs authored by the Carter Family, Gene Clark, Mary Margaret O'Hara, John Cale, Nick Cave, Patti Smith and Charlie Rich.

== Artwork ==
The cover photo ("Herman in the Wheatfield") was found at Grandma's Village Antiques. The cover design was made by Modern Dog.

== Critical reception ==
Professional ratings
Review scores
| Source | Rating |
|---|---|
| AllMusic | 4.5/5 stars |

In a highly positive review for AllMusic, Jason Ankeny said: "Satisfied Mind represents the purest evocation to date of the Walkabouts' aesthetic and its standing at the crossroads of country, rock, folk, and punk."

== Track listing ==
1. "Satisfied Mind" (Jack Rhodes, Joe Hayes) – 4:47
2. "Loom of the Land" (Nick Cave) – 5:59
3. "The River People" (Robert Forster) – 5:17
4. "Polly" (Gene Clark) – 4:15
5. "Buffalo Ballet" (John Cale) – 3:28
6. "Lover's Crime" (Pee Wee Maddux) – 2:52
7. "Shelter for an Evening" (Gary Heffern) – 3:04
8. "Dear Darling" (Mary Margaret O'Hara) – 2:27
9. "Poor Side of Town" (Johnny Rivers) – 4:31
10. "Free Money" (Lenny Kaye, Patti Smith) – 5:17
11. "The Storms Are on the Ocean" (The Carter Family) – 5:01
12. "Feel Like Going Home (Charlie Rich) – 8:17
13. "Will You Miss Me When I'm Gone?" (Traditional) – 4:10

== Release history ==
| Region | Date | Label | Format | Catalog |
|---|---|---|---|---|
| Germany | 1993 | Sub Pop | LP | SP 116/294 |
| Germany | 1993 | Sub Pop | CD | SPCD 116/294, EFA CD 08294-2, G-0294 |
| Germany | November 12, 1993 | Glitterhouse Records | CD | SP 116/294, GRCD 294 |
| United States | 1996 | Creative Man | CD | CMD 029 |

== Personnel ==
The Walkabouts

- Carla Torgerson – vocals, guitars, cello
- Michael Wells – bass, harmonica, backup vocals
- Terri Moeller – drums, percussion, backup vocals
- Glenn Slater – piano, organ, Moog synthesizer, accordion
- Chris Eckman – vocals, guitars

Additional musicians

- Larry Barrett – mandoline and backup vocals (7), lap steel (11), banjo (6)
- Peter Buck – electric bouzouki (2), mandoline (2,3), Black Mountain dulcimer (13)
- Andrew Hare – pedal steel (1,2,4,9)
- Clayton Park – acoustic violin and Jensen electric violin (5,6,7)
- Terry Lee Hale – acoustic slide guitar (8)
- Ivan Kral – electric guitar and synthesizer (10)
- Mark Lanegan – vocals (12)

Technical personnel

- The Walkabouts – production
- Kevin Sugg – production, engineering
- Reinhard Holstein – executive producer, concept
