= Skelpin =

American folk band

Skelpin is an Irish folk music group based in San Diego, California. They perform a fusion of Irish Music and Spanish Flamenco, with Middle-Eastern percussion and have toured with this Irish Fusion globally. Skelpin is associated with the "Greening of the Gaslamp", a movement of increased Irish culture in the San Diego area. Skelpin also performs each year at the World Music Festival on Catalina Island, held near the end of each October.

== History ==
In 2005 Skelpin performed for 3 months (2005/07/01 - 2005/08/31) at Tokyo DisneySea, and returned to Tokyo in 2007 for the annual Irish Music Festival.

Tim Foley also wrote music and played uilleann pipes for the movie Master and Commander: The Far Side of the World. On September 6, 2008, Foley reported that his set of uilleann pipes were stolen from his car while he was house sitting in La Jolla, California.

Skelpin's latest album Trip to Skye was released in October 2009, with the band playing CD release shows around their hometown of San Diego. Co-Produced by the band, Tim Riley and Alan Sanderson, the album includes guest appearances from percussionist David Page and Matt Hensley of Flogging Molly.

In early 2010, a song from A Trip to Skye, "The View", written by Foley, won Grand Prize in the World Music category of the John Lennon Songwriting Contest.

Skelpin has been nominated in the annual San Diego Music Awards in 2003, 2004, 2005, 2008, 2009 and 2011 in the category of World Music. In September 2010, Skelpin won the San Diego Music Award for "Best World Music Album" for their disc, A Trip to Skye.

In 2013 Petrie released a solo album, Pocket Venus, with the members of Skelpin, including Foley and Platas as well as honorary member Hensley, on several tracks. The album was nominated for a 2013 San Diego Music Award.

== Current members ==
- Patric Petrie: vocals, fiddle
- Tim Foley: vocals, guitar, uilleann pipes, reed and wind instruments
- Enrique Platas: drums, percussion
- Wesley Forsberg: bass, electric guitar
- Jimmy Patton: flamenco guitar

== Friends, former members, and guests ==
- Matt Hensley: accordion
- Rowshan Dowlatabadi: accordion, middle-eastern percussion
- David Maldonado: bass, flamenco guitar, mandolin, banjo
- Hector Maldonado: guitars, bass, vocals
- John Martin: percussion
- Mike Kent: drums
- Kellen Miller: drums
- Casey Orillion: drums
- Harold Southworth: vocals, percussion
- Steve Peavey: guitar, mandolin
- Richard Tibbits: penny whistle, flute, woodwinds

== Discography ==
- Whiskey Before Breakfast (2002)
- Rua Rojo (2005)
- Trip to Skye (2009)reissued with new cover 2010
