= Regard the End =

Studio album by Willard Grant Conspiracy
- Released: June 2003
- Recorded: Ljubljana, Slovenia
- Genre: Americana; Alt-Country
- Length: 47:00
- Label: Loose Music; Glitterhouse Records; Kimchee Records
- Producer: Simon Alpin, Robert Fisher

Willard Grant Conspiracy chronology
In the Fishtank 8 (2002)	Regard the End (2003)	There But for The Grace of God (2004)

Professional ratings
Aggregate scores
Source	Rating
Metacritic	80/100
Review scores
Source	Rating
AllMusic	4/5 stars
The Austin Chronicle	3.5/5 stars
E!	B
Entertainment Weekly	B+
Mojo	3.5/5 stars
Pitchfork	3.9/10
Rolling Stone	3/5 stars
Uncut	10/10

Regard the End is the sixth full album by alt-country band Willard Grant Conspiracy.

The song "Soft Hand" is used in the 2003 film Stuck on You.

== Track listing ==
All music written by Robert Fisher.

1. "River in the Pines" – 4:45
2. "The Trials of Harrison Hayes" – 3:16
3. "Beyond the Shore" – 3:13
4. "The Ghost of the Girl in the Well" – 4:50
5. "Twistification" – 5:23
6. "Another Man Is Gone" – 3:22
7. "Soft Hand" – 5:43
8. "Rosalee" – 3:31
9. "Fare Thee Well" – 4:09
10. "Day Is Passed and Gone" – 1:46
11. "The Suffering Song" – 7:51

== Personnel ==
Eighteen musicians collaborated on the record including:

- Robert Fisher
- Simon Alpin
- Chris Eckman (The Walkabouts)
- Kristin Hersh
- Blake Hazard
- Jess Klein
- Pete Sutton
- Nathan Logus
- David Michael Curry
- Dennis Cronin
- Paul Austin (The Transmissionary Six)
