= Let It Roll =

Let It Roll may refer to:

== Albums ==
- Let It Roll (Little Feat album), or the title song, 1988
- Let It Roll (Don Johnson album), or the title song, 1989
- Let It Roll (Willard Grant Conspiracy album), or the title song, 2006
- Let It Roll (Midland album), or the title song, 2019
- Let It Roll: Songs by George Harrison, 2009

== Songs ==
- "Let It Roll" (Doug Lazy song), 1989
- "Let It Roll" (Flo Rida song), 2012
- "Let It Roll" (Emerson Drive song), 2012
- "Let It Roll", a 1994 song by Nitty Gritty Dirt Band from Acoustic
- "Let It Roll", a 2001 song by Train from Drops of Jupiter
- "Let It Roll", a 2003 song by Hieroglyphics from Full Circle
- "Let It Roll", a 2006 song by the Devin Townsend Band from Synchestra
- "Let It Roll", a 2007 song by Velvet Revolver from Libertad
- "Let It Roll", a 2007 song by All Time Low from So Wrong, It's Right
- "Let It Roll", a 2010 song by Superchick from Reinvention
- "Let It Roll", a 2019 song by Lewis Capaldi from the extended edition of Divinely Uninspired to a Hellish Extent

== Television ==
- "Let It Roll", an episode of the TV series Adventure Time: Side Quests
- "Let It Roll", an episode of the TV series Pocoyo
