= Scavenger (disambiguation) =

A scavenger is an animal that feeds on dead and decaying organic matter such as carrion, refuse or rotting plant matter.

Scavenger(s) or Scavenging may also refer to:

== Film and TV ==
- Scavengers (2013 film), a science fiction film
- The Scavengers (1959 film), a Filipino crime film
- The Scavengers (1969 film), a Western war drama and exploitation film
- List of Lego Ninjago: Masters of Spinjitzu episodes#"Scavengers"
- Scavenger (Transformers), characters in the Transformers series
- Scavengers, Walking Dead season 7
- Scavenger (audio drama), a 2014 audio drama based on the television series Doctor Who
- Scavengers (game show), a British game show

== Games ==
- Scavenger hunt, a game
- Scavenger, Inc., a video game publisher

== Music ==
- The Scavengers, a New Zealand punk rock band from the 1970s

=== Albums ===
- Scavenger (album), a 1991 album by The Walkabouts
- Scavengers (album), a 2001 album by Calla
- The Scavenger, a 1966 album by Nat Adderley

== Profession or activity ==
- Mule scavenger, an old profession whereby a person retrieves cotton from underneath a spinning machine
- Waste picker, a person who picks recyclable elements from waste

== Science and technology ==
- Scavenger (chemistry), a method of removing impurities or other undesired chemicals from a mixture
- Scavenger receptor (endocrinology)
- Scavenger receptor (immunology), a group of pattern recognition receptors of the innate immune system
- Scavenging (engine), automotive process of pushing exhausted gas-charge out of the cylinder and drawing in fresh air
- CPU scavenging, salvaging of machine time
- Energy harvesting also called energy scavenging, the capturing energy for autonomous devices

== Other uses ==
- Scavenger (comics), an armored enemy of Aquaman
- Operation Scavenger, a World War II operation in the Pacific theater
- Scavenger's daughter, a rack-like torture instrument

== See also ==
- SCVNGR, a social location-based gaming platform for mobile phones
