= Scavenger (album) =

Studio album by The Walkabouts
- Released: September 1, 1991
- Recorded: September/October 1990
- Genre: Alternative rock, alternative country
- Length: 42:12
- Label: Sub Pop
- Producer: Gary Smith

The Walkabouts chronology
Rag & Bone (1990)	Scavenger (1991)	New West Motel (1993)

Scavenger is the fourth studio album by The Walkabouts released September 1, 1991, on Sub Pop Records. It received national exposure in the United States through NPR. The album is available in various forms (CD, cassette, digital download) from Amazon.com and as digital download from iTunes Store in the US and the United Kingdom among others.

Scavenger was produced by Gary Smith and features guest appearances by Brian Eno and Natalie Merchant.

== Critical reception ==
Professional ratings
Review scores
Source	Rating
AllMusic	3.5/5 stars
The Village Voice	(choice cut)
The Washington Post	(mixed)

Jason Ankeny writing in a positive review for AllMusic said: "like its predecessors, Cataract, [Scavenger] refines the Walkabouts' sound even as the band's scope broadens."

== Track listing ==
Source: AllMusic

All songs written by The Walkabouts, except where noted. All lyrics written by Chris Eckman, except where noted.

1. "Dead Man Rise" – 3:27
2. "Stir the Ashes" – 3:45
3. "The Night Watch" – 3:28
4. "Hangman" – 4:59
5. "Where the Deep Water Goes" – 3:11
6. "Blown Away" – 3:43
7. "Nothing Is a Stranger" – 4:18
8. "Let's Burn Down the Cornfield" (Randy Newman) – 2:51
9. "River Blood" – 3:03
10. "Train to Mercy" (string arrangement by Mark Nichols) – 9:27

The album was recorded at Steve Larsons Studios in Seattle during September and October 1990. Mixing was done in October 1990 at The Carriage House, Stamford, Connecticut. "River Blood" was remixed by Gary Smith and Matt Lane in December 1990 at The Carriage House. Additional recordings were done in the Skyline Studios, New York. The album was mastered at the Skyline Studios.

=== Release history ===
Region	Date	Label	Format	Catalog
United States	September 1, 1991	Sub Pop Records	CD	SP124
Germany	1991	Sub Pop Records	CD	SPCD 019/161
Germany	1991	Sub Pop Records	LP	SP 019/161
Germany	1991	Glitterhouse Records	CD	GRCD 161

== Personnel ==
The Walkabouts

- Glenn Slater – organ, piano, synthesizer, accordion
- Grant Eckman – drums
- Carla Torgerson – vocals, acoustic guitars, electric guitars, cello
- Michael Wells – bass
- Chris Eckman – vocals, electric guitars

Additional musician

- Brian Eno – synthesizer, backup vocals on "Train to Mercy"
- Natalie Merchant – harmony vocals on "Where the Deep Water Goes"
- Larry Barrett – mandolin on "Where the Deep Water Goes"
- Gary Smith – tambourine on "Dead Man Rise" and "Stir the Ashes", Deepwater synthesizer on "Where the Deep Water Goes", Morricone keyboard on "Blown Way"
- Steve Haigler – sleigh bells on "Train to Mercy"

Bravura String Quartet

strings on "Train to Mercy"

- Dave Beck – cello
- Steven Toda – violin
- Gregg Rice – violin
- Sam Williams – viola

Technical personnel

- Gary Smith – production, mixing on "River Blood"
- Ed Brooks – engineering
- Steve Haigler – mixing
- Jim Haviland – recording technician
- Bruce Calder – additional recording
- Sam Hofstedt – engineering assistant
- Matt Lane – mixing assistant, mixing on "River Blood"
- Greg Calbi – mastering

Additional personnel

- Jane Higgins – design
- Tony Kroes – design, paintings
- Charles Peterson – color photo
- Chris Peters – paintings
