= Trail of Stars =

Studio album by The Walkabouts
- Released: August 2, 1999
- Genre: Alternative rock, alt country. chamber pop
- Length: 58:12
- Label: Glitterhouse
- Producer: Phill Brown, The Walkabouts

The Walkabouts chronology
Nighttown (1997)	Trail of Stars (1999)	Train Leaves at Eight (2000)

Trail of Stars is the ninth studio album by American alternative country band The Walkabouts released on August 2, 1999 through Glitterhouse Records. It's their return album to Glitterhouse, formerly Sub Pop Europe, after a two album detour with major label Virgin.

== Track listing ==
All tracks written by Chris Eckman, except where noted.

1. "Desert Skies" (Eckman, Carla Torgerson, strings arrangement by Glenn Slater) – 7:32
2. "Straight to the Stars" – 4:32
3. "Gold" – 6:26
4. "Last Tears" – 6:21
5. "Crime Story" – 4:39
6. "Hightimes" (strings arrangement by Fred Chalenor) – 4:53
7. "Harvey's Quote to Me" (Slater) – 1:29
8. "On the Day" (Eckman, Chalenor, woodwinds arrangement by Chalenor) – 6:30
9. "Till I Reach You" – 4:37
10. "Drown" – 4:30
11. "No One the Wiser" (strings arrangement by Slater) – 6:43

limited edition

12. "Bonnie and Clyde" (Serge Gainsbourg) – 6:27

The limited edition also contained a multimedia track with a screen saver.

The album was engineered and mixed at Paradise Sound, Index, Washington and Avast!, Seattle, Washington and Swanyard, London. The album was mastered at Country Masters, Surrey.

=== Release history ===
Region	Date	Label	Format	Catalog
Germany	August 2, 1999	Glitterhouse Records	2xLP	GR 450
Germany	August 2, 1999	Glitterhouse Records	CD	GRCD 450
United States	1999	S2 Records	CD	S2CD 2500

=== Drown (Single) ===
Cover of the single "Drown"

Drown is the eleventh single by American alternative country band The Walkabouts released on August 23, 1999, through Glitterhouse Records. The catalog number is GR 461.

Track listing

1. "Drown (Stars on 45 edit)"
2. "Bonnie and Clyde" (Serge Gainsbourg)
3. "Lost in the Scraps"

The song "Bonnie and Clyde" was also released as a bonus track of the limited editions (both LP and CD) of Trail of Stars.

== Personnel ==
- Fred Chalenor – bass
- Terri Moeller – drums, percussion, loops
- Glenn Slater – organ, Fender Rhodes, piano, ARP synthesizer, Moog synthesizer, mellotron, tapes
- Carla Torgerson – vocals, electric guitar, acoustic guitar, percussion, tapes
- Chris Eckman – vocals, electric guitar, acoustic guitar, piano, wobble board, samples, loops

Additional musicians

- Steve Moore – trombone
- Christine Gunn – solo cello
- Bev Setzer – clarinet
- Kevin Suggs – pedel steel
- April Acevez Cameron – viola
- Justine Foy – cello
- Tyler A. Reilly – violin
- Rebecca Clemens-Keith – violin
- Phill Brown – loops, sounds

Technical personnel

- Phill Brown – production, mixing
- Kevin Suggs – additional engineering
- Pat Sample – assistant engineer
- Kip Beelman – assistant engineer
- Jason Howes – assistant engineer
- Dennis Blackham – mastering

Additional personnel

- Maurizio Poletto – design
- Enrico Bravi – design
- Mark Van S. – band photographs
- David French – space-ship sculptures

== Critical reception ==
Professional ratings
Review scores
Source	Rating
Allmusic	2/5 stars
KEXP-FM	favorable

John Duffy wrote for Allmusic: "... Drenched in John Cale-like soundscape washes and heavy strings, Trail of Stars comes off as morose and dirge-like. Only "Straight to the Stars" doesn't feel like a death march. This is frustrating, since the instrumentation of the record is expertly crafted and lovingly played. ..."

Don Jates wrote for KEXP-FM: "The veteran Seattle band continues to evolve with this album of dark, delicately textured atmospheric pop."

Gaesteliste compared it to Portishead, Massive Attack, and Roxy Music.

== Charts ==
The album charted one week (36/1999) on position 30 of the Norwegian album charts.
