= Flying Low =

Studio album by Willard Grant Conspiracy
- Released: 1998
- Length: 58:12
- Labels: Slow River; Rykodisc

Willard Grant Conspiracy chronology
3am Sunday @ Fortune Otto's (1996)	Flying Low (1998)	Weevils in the Captain's Biscuit (1998)

Flying Low is an album by the American band Willard Grant Conspiracy, released in 1998. It was their first album for Rykodisc. The band considered the album to be "swamp noir".

== Production ==
The recording sessions involved the primary trio of Robert Fisher, Paul Austin, and Sean O'Brien, with many other musicians contributing in the studio, including Walter Salas-Humara. The band lost track of which musicians played on which tracks and decided to forgo credits. Most of the songs used only string instruments and snare drum. "House Is Not a Home (Palmdale, CA)" is about a man who returns to his family home to set it on fire. "No Such Thing as Clean" is about living with a drug habit.

== Critical reception ==
Professional ratings
Review scores
Source	Rating
AllMusic	4/5 stars
NME	8/10
The Times	7/10
The Virgin Encyclopedia of Nineties Music	4/5 stars

The Boston Herald called the album "a gorgeous disc, offering sleek, slo-fi subtleties and chiming acoustic refrains... It's wrapped in lush but restrained passions as delivered by guitarist Robert Fisher's dusky voice." The Boston Globe wrote that "the Willard Grant Conspiracy is a brilliant, evocative band that floats in the melancholic pool as do the Tindersticks, Nick Cave, and Mark Eitzel." CMJ New Music Monthly noted that the songs "range from suicide waltzes to dynamic, jam-heavy thinking person's rock".

The Washington Post determined that "as impressive as the atmospherics are ... Austin's chord changes are monotonous and Fisher's vocals tend to become as pompous as Jim Morrison's—though without the Doors' pop hooks." The Observer labeled the band "a valuable addition to the slow-fi, alt. country scene inhabited by the likes of Lambchop and the Handsome Family." The Times considered Flying Low to be "post-punk Americana".

AllMusic concluded that "at times, Flying Low is a little precious, but that only adds to its darkly attractive ambience." In 2024, Uncut placed Flying Low at No. 431 on its list of "The 500 Greatest Albums of the 1990s".

== Track listing ==
Flying Low track listing
No.	Title	Length
1.	"The Smile at the Bottom of the Ladder"	1:26
2.	"Evening Mass"	6:32
3.	"August List"	5:26
4.	"St. John Street"	5:09
5.	"House Is Not a Home (Palmdale, CA)"	5:54
6.	"Bring the Monster Inside"	6:46
7.	"No Such Thing as Clean"	8:47
8.	"It Doesn't Matter"	4:00
9.	"Eephus Pitch"	4:45
10.	"Water"	5:15
11.	"Split Tender"	4:12
Total length:		58:12
