= All Black and Hairy =

All Black And Hairy

Studio album by Gravedigger V
- Released: 1984
- Genre: Indie, Lo-fi, Garage
- Label: Voxx Records
- Producer: Greg Shaw

Professional ratings
Review scores
Source	Rating
AllMusic	4/5 stars

All Black and Hairy is the first and only album by American garage rock revival band Gravedigger V, released in 1984 before the band disbanded.

== Critical reception ==
AllMusic called the album "both perfectly named and perfectly performed -- if it's nothing but a revivalist approach at heart, it's such a damn entertaining one that there's no cause for complaint." Trouser Press called it "groovy, authentic-sounding (credit the production by label owner Greg Shaw) garage punk with convincing ’60s clumsiness and sincerity." Maximumrocknroll wrote that "the high points here are an amazingly snot-nosed vocalist with sneering ’60s inflections, some strong original songwriting, an appropriately tinny 'mono' production, and an above-average choice of tunes to cover."

== Track listing ==
Side A

1. All Black And Hairy (Lord Sutch)
2. Tomorrow Is Yesterday (Friedman)
3. No Good Woman
4. Do Like Me
5. Hate
6. She's A Cur (Leighton, Ward)

Side B

1. Searching (Revercomb, Allen)
2. She's Gone (Leighton, Friedman)
3. Night Of The Phantom (Larry And The Blue Notes)
4. Don't Tread On Me (K. Massengill)
5. One Ugly Child (Bright)
6. She Got (Friedman)
7. Stoneage Stomp (Leighton, Friedman)

== Personnel ==
- Tom Ward – vocals, bass
- David Anderson – drums
- John Hanrattie – guitars
- Ted Friedman – lead vocals, lead guitars
- Leighton – vocals
- Gary Stern – engineer
- Greg Shaw – producer
