= Devil's Road =

Studio album by the Walkabouts
- Released: 1996
- Label: Virgin Schallplatten
- Producer: Victor Van Vugt

The Walkabouts chronology
Setting the Woods on Fire (1994)	Devil's Road (1996)	Nighttown (1997)

Devil's Road is an album by the American band the Walkabouts, released in 1996. The first single was "The Light Will Stay On", which was a hit in many European countries; by 2003, the album had sold around 85,000 copies on the continent. Devil's Road was regarded as an attempt at a more commercial album in comparison to the Walkabouts' previous work. The album was reissued in 2014, with a second disc of live songs and alternate takes.

== Production ==
Produced by Victor Van Vugt, the album was recorded in Cologne, Germany. Mark Nichols arranged the string parts, which were performed by the Warsaw National Philharmonic Orchestra. The songs were written by Chris Eckman and sung by Eckman and Carla Torgerson.

== Critical reception ==
Professional ratings
Review scores
Source	Rating
AllMusic	4.5/5 stars
Daily Record	7/10
The Encyclopedia of Popular Music	3/5 stars
NME	5/10
Ox-Fanzine	5/5 stars

Trouser Press deemed Devil's Road the band's "most ambitiously eclectic album and certainly one of its best." The Irish Times praised "the countryish lament, 'The Leaving Kind', with Carla Torgerson's evocative doomed vocals carrying a refrain laden with the grim fruits of fate's calling." The Daily Record noted that the Walkabouts "have become more mainstream—without losing any of their simplistic beauty and integrity." NME stated that the band is "still churning out imagery-laden fables of the American heartland."

AllMusic called the album "dark and soulful, the work of a band at the peak of its powers." MusicHound Rock: The Essential Album Guide concluded that "the band is firing in that kind of sublime territory that few rock bands ever reach." Reviewing the reissue, the Northamptonshire Evening Telegraph determined that "the band's melancholy fusion of folk, country and Americana is captured at its most compelling on Chris Eckman creations such as 'The Light Will Stay On', 'Rebecca Wild' and 'Forgiveness Song'."

== Track listing ==
No.	Title	Length
1.	"The Light Will Stay On"
2.	"Rebecca Wild"
3.	"The Stopping-Off Place"
4.	"Cold Eye"
5.	"Christmas Valley"
6.	"Blue Head Flame"
7.	"When Fortune Smiles"
8.	"All for This"
9.	"Fairground Blues"
10.	"The Leaving Kind"
11.	"Forgiveness Song"

=== Weekly charts ===
Weekly chart performance for Devil's Road
Chart (1996)	Peak position
Swedish Albums (Sverigetopplistan)	41
