= Willard Grant Conspiracy =

American alt-country band

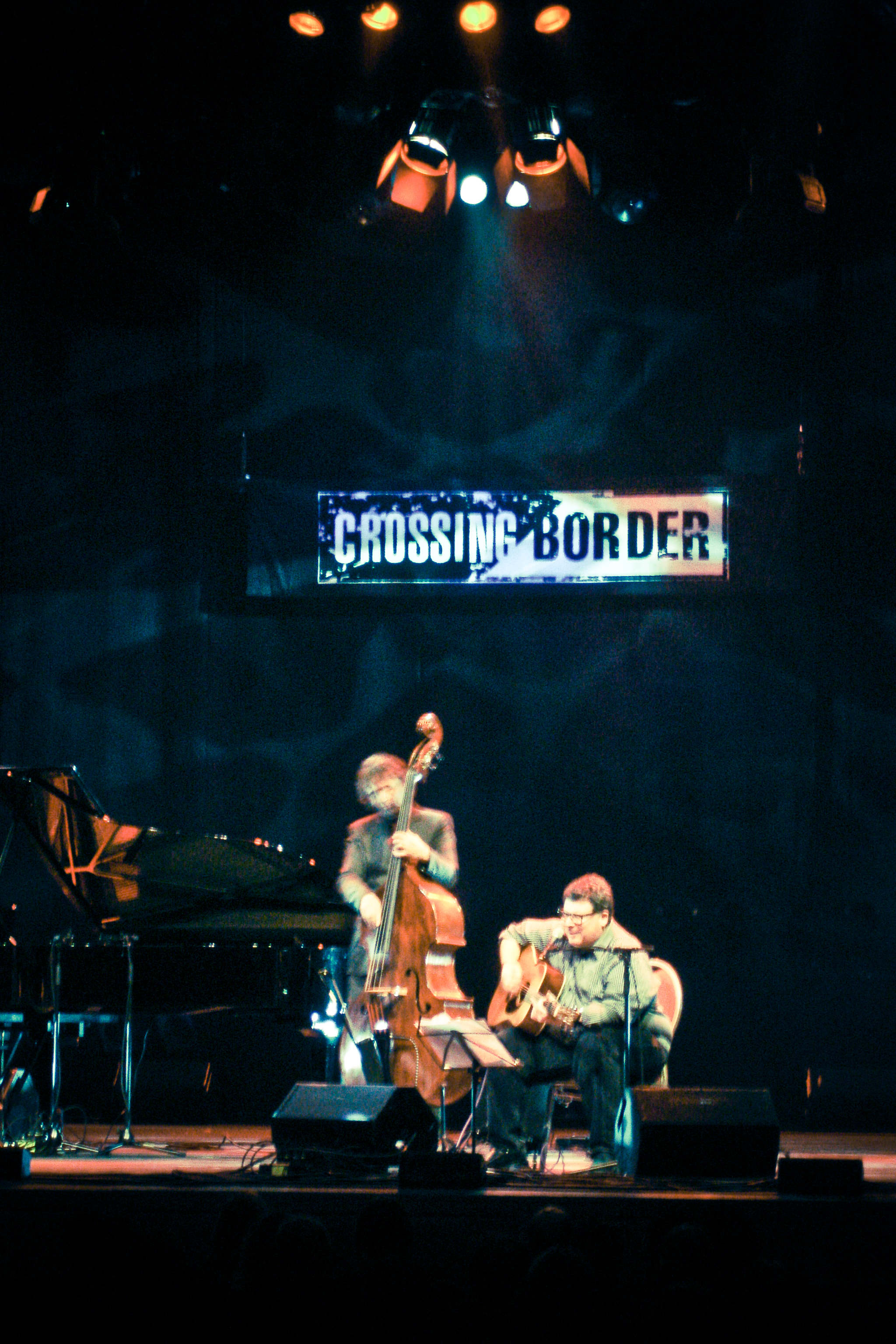
- WGC in 2008

Background information
- Origin: Boston, Massachusetts, United States
- Genres: Alternative country Americana
- Years active: 1995–2016
- Labels: Loose Music, Rykodisc, Glitterhouse Records, Slow River Records, Kimchee Records
- Past members: Robert Fisher; Paul Austin; Sean O'Brien; James Apt; David Michael Curry; Erich Groat; Matt Griffin; Malcolm Travis

Willard Grant Conspiracy (WGC) was an alt-country band based originally in Boston, Massachusetts and later near Palmdale, California, U.S. The band operated as a collective, with vocalist and songwriter Robert Fisher the only permanent member throughout its existence. Fisher's voice and Americana style have been compared to both John Cale and Johnny Cash, with most songs being acoustic.

== History ==
The band was originally formed in Boston in 1995, by North Hollywood, California–raised Robert Fisher (born Robert Neil Fisher, September 9, 1957–February 12, 2017), and Paul Austin. The two had previously collaborated since the early 1980s in the band Laughing Academy, first in Portland, Maine then in Boston, with various collaborators. The band was briefly renamed the Flower Tamers before dissolving. Fisher and Austin added guitarist Sean O'Brien to record their debut album, 3 AM Sunday at Fortune Otto's, issued on Fisher's own Dahlia label. For their 1998 album, Flying Low, released on Rykodisc, the trio added James Apt (guitar), David Michael Curry (viola), Erich Groat (mandolin) and Matt Griffin (bass).

Over subsequent years, over 30 other musicians occasionally contributed to the band, both in the studio and during live performances. WGC was signed to the independent label Loose, having previously released on Rykodisc, Glitterhouse Records and Kimchee Records. Later albums included the live recording Weevils in the Captain's Biscuit, and Mojave. The band's 2003 release Regard The End, featuring Kristin Hersh as well as Chris Eckman of The Walkabouts, and recorded in Ljubljana, Slovenia, received critical acclaim with Uncut magazine naming it Album of the Month. Their albums have been described as "experimenting with country and psychedelic sounds and the blues and punk, while... Regard the End, which many fans and critics see as their masterpiece, upgraded several traditional songs and merged them with a rock sound."

In 2002, Paul Austin started to play in The Transmissionary Six with Terri Moeller of The Walkabouts, and in 2011 he became a member of The Walkabouts. In 2003, Fisher returned to live in his home state of California. Willard Grant Conspiracy toured extensively in 2005 and 2006, visiting 23 countries, including a showcase at the South by Southwest music festival. They continued to tour in the US and occasionally in Europe and the UK until 2016. Fisher and Curry also toured together as a duo, and Fisher performed as a solo artist and with other musicians including Scottish singer-songwriter Jackie Leven and arranger and composer Malcolm Lindsay.

Robert Fisher died of cancer on February 12, 2017, aged 59.

== Discography ==
=== Studio albums ===
- 3am Sunday @ Fortune Otto's (1996)
- Flying Low (1998)
- Mojave (1999)
- Everything's Fine (2000)
- Regard the End (2003)
- Let It Roll (2006)
- Pilgrim Road (2008)
- Paper Covers Stone (2009)
- Ghost Republic (2013)
- Untethered (2018)

=== Live albums ===
- Weevils In The Captain's Biscuit (1998)
- The Green, Green Grass of Slovenia (2000)
- Live 2001 – Amsterdam and Aberdeen (2001)
- Live At Rockpalast-Crossroads(Il Mucchio) (2004)
- From a Distant Shore: Live in the Netherlands (2004)

=== Compilation albums ===
- There But for The Grace Of God (2004)

=== EPs ===
- Color of the Sun (1999)
- Radio Free WGC (1999)
- In the Fishtank 8, with Telefunk (2002)
