= Setting the Woods on Fire =

Studio album by the Walkabouts
- Released: January and February 1994
- Studios: Ironwood, Hanzek Audio; mixed at Robert Lang
- Genre: Rock
- Length: 63:12
- Label: Creative Man/Cargo
- Producers: Ed Brooks, the Walkabouts

The Walkabouts chronology
Satisfied Mind (1993)	Setting the Woods on Fire (1994)	Devil's Road (1996)

Setting the Woods on Fire is a studio album by the Walkabouts.

== Critical reception ==
Professional ratings
Review scores
Source	Rating
AllMusic	4/5 stars
Calgary Herald	B+
The Encyclopedia of Popular Music	3/5 stars

Jason Ankeny, for AllMusic, wrote: "A sweeping, stately record, it owes a great deal to the Stones' Exile on Main St." The Encyclopedia of Popular Music called the album "a strong collection of original material." Trouser Press called it "consistently ace," writing that "strong tunes like 'Firetrap', 'Good Luck Morning' and the rousing, horn-driven 'Hole in the Mountain' [are] given a spiky, full-bodied grace." Uncut deemed it an "underselling classic" that "captures perfectly [the band's] haunted experimentalism." CMJ New Music Monthly wrote that the album's "disposition is pensive and vaguely ominous throughout."

== Track listing ==
All songs by the Walkabouts (c)1994, Fire & Skill Publishing (BMI), administrated worldwide by Bug Music Inc.

1. Good Luck Morning – 4:13
2. Firetrap – 5:39
3. Bordertown – 5:51
4. Feeling No Pain – 5:12
5. Old Crow – 4:26
6. Almost Wisdom – 4:45
7. Sand and Gravel – 6:34
8. Nightdrive – 5:38
9. Hole in the Mountain – 3:49
10. Pass Me On Over – 4:10
11. Up in the Graveyard – 6:12
12. Promised – 6:33

== Performers ==
The Walkabouts

- Glenn Slater – piano, organ, accordion, loops
- Michael Wells – bass guitar, harmonica
- Terri Moeller – drums, percussion, backup vocals
- Carla Torgerson – vocals, acoustic & electric guitars, cello
- Chris Eckman – vocals, electric & acoustic guitars, lyrics

Additional musicians

- Larry Barrett – mandolin (11,12), lap steel (4,5)
- Bruce Wirth – violin (7)
- Andrew Hare – pedal steel (12)

Tiny Hot Orchestra Horns

- Zach Permeson – trombone (9)
- Mark Condelaria – tenor sax (9)
- Marcus Membrane – trumpet (9)
- "Dutch Beef" Sout – tenor sax (9)
