= Brian Witkin =

American entertainment attorney & entrepreneur

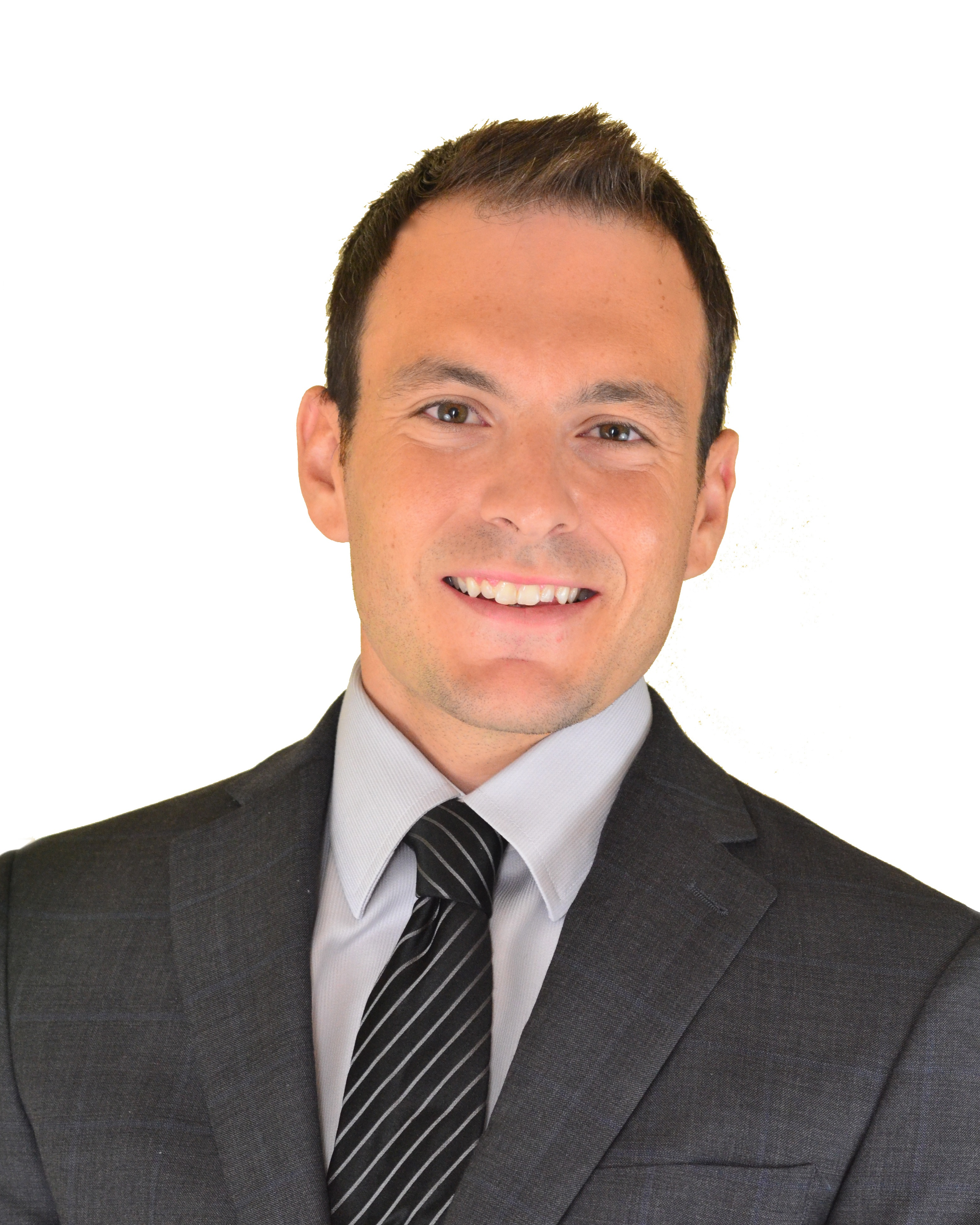
- Born: San Diego, California
- Occupation: Entrepreneur
- Website: www.brianwitkin.com

Brian Witkin is an entertainment attorney and entrepreneur from Del Mar, California as well as founder and CEO of Pacific Records, an independent record label based in San Diego, California. He is also a founding member of Hawaiian themed group, Slack Key Ohana. In 2005, at the age of 19, Witkin was featured in San Diego Magazine for young people to watch and in Feb. 2015 was named “Kickass Entrepreneur” in the San Diego Union Tribune Witkin is the son of Joe Witkin the original pianist for the band Sha Na Na, and the grandson of Evelyn M. Witkin an American geneticist who was awarded the National Medal of Science by President George W. Bush in 2002 for her work on DNA mutagenesis and DNA repair and the grandson of Herman Witkin, an internationally known American psychologist and senior research scientist at the Educational Testing Service in Princeton, N.J. Witkin is also the nephew of computer scientist Andrew Witkin

== Education ==
Witkin holds a Doctor of Jurisprudence degree (JD) from San Francisco Law School, Master of Business Administration degree (MBA) and Bachelor of Arts Degree (BA) in history from National University in San Diego,

== Pacific Records ==
In 1999 Witkin started "Real2Reel Records", which in 2003 was changed to Pacific Records, Inc. and became a division of Wingnut Media Group, Inc, based in Del Mar, California. In 2007, Pacific Records was then transferred to Georgi Entertainment, LLC and in 2009 Witkin purchased the company back under the holding company New Pacific Group, currently, Pacific Records, Inc. Pacific Records has evolved from its humble beginnings as a retail record store chain into a multi-dimensional entity that includes recording studios, engineering services, CD duplication, marketing and distributing. The primary focus remains as an independent record label and music publisher. Pacific Records current lineup includes: Grammy Honoree Lito Romero, Wes James, Super Groupie, Social Club, Sandollar, Sprung Monkey, Hilly Rubin, Steven Ybarra, A Mayfield Affair, Approaching Fiction, Jimmy & Enrique, Samantha Clemons, Jimmy Patton, Scott Bergman, Men and Gods and John Preston. The label maintains an active website found at www.PacificRecords.com Pacific Records was a division of the Warner Music Group, which was active in the late 1970s and distributed (appropriately) by Atlantic Records. Its most successful artist was Alan O'Day which reached #9 on the Billboard Charts

== Real estate ==
Since 2003, Witkin has been a licensed real estate broker in Southern California and a recipient of the UCSD Extension Professional Certification in Real Estate and founded his own brokerage firm in 2010.

== Philanthropy & activism ==
Witkin serves as Vice Chairman and member of the Board of Directors for the Olivia Hudson Foundation, a non-profit 501-C3 company in San Diego, California which helps further pediatric brain cancer research and assist families of children with brain cancer by raising public awareness of the disease. Since 2010 Witkin has been a certified PADI Divemaster and in 2012, In efforts to support the ban of unprovoked slaughter of Great White Sharks Witkin founded ‘’Save The Great Whites’’ and became a volunteer as a NOAA Whale Disentanglement Team Member. Witkin is a board member of National University (California)’s College of Letters and Sciences Advisory Board. National University is the second-largest private, non-profit institution of higher learning in California.

== Photography ==
Witkin is a credited surf and environmental photographer for the UT San Diego, San Diego Reader and Sol Spot.

== Pilot ==
Since 2004, Witkin has been a certified and registered private pilot with the Federal Aviation Administration.

== Musician ==
Witkin has released music with several groups including the Warrior Finches and Cambrian Shores. In 2021 he co-founded the Hawaiian themed group, Slack Key Ohana, with musician Kamaka Mullen. Their debut self titled album, released in December 2021, won Best World Music Album at the 2022 San Diego Music Awards.

== Journalism ==
In July 2021 Witkin began writing a semi-regular column, Music and the Law, for the monthly publication, The San Diego Troubadour.
