= Christian Witkin =

American photographer (born 1966)

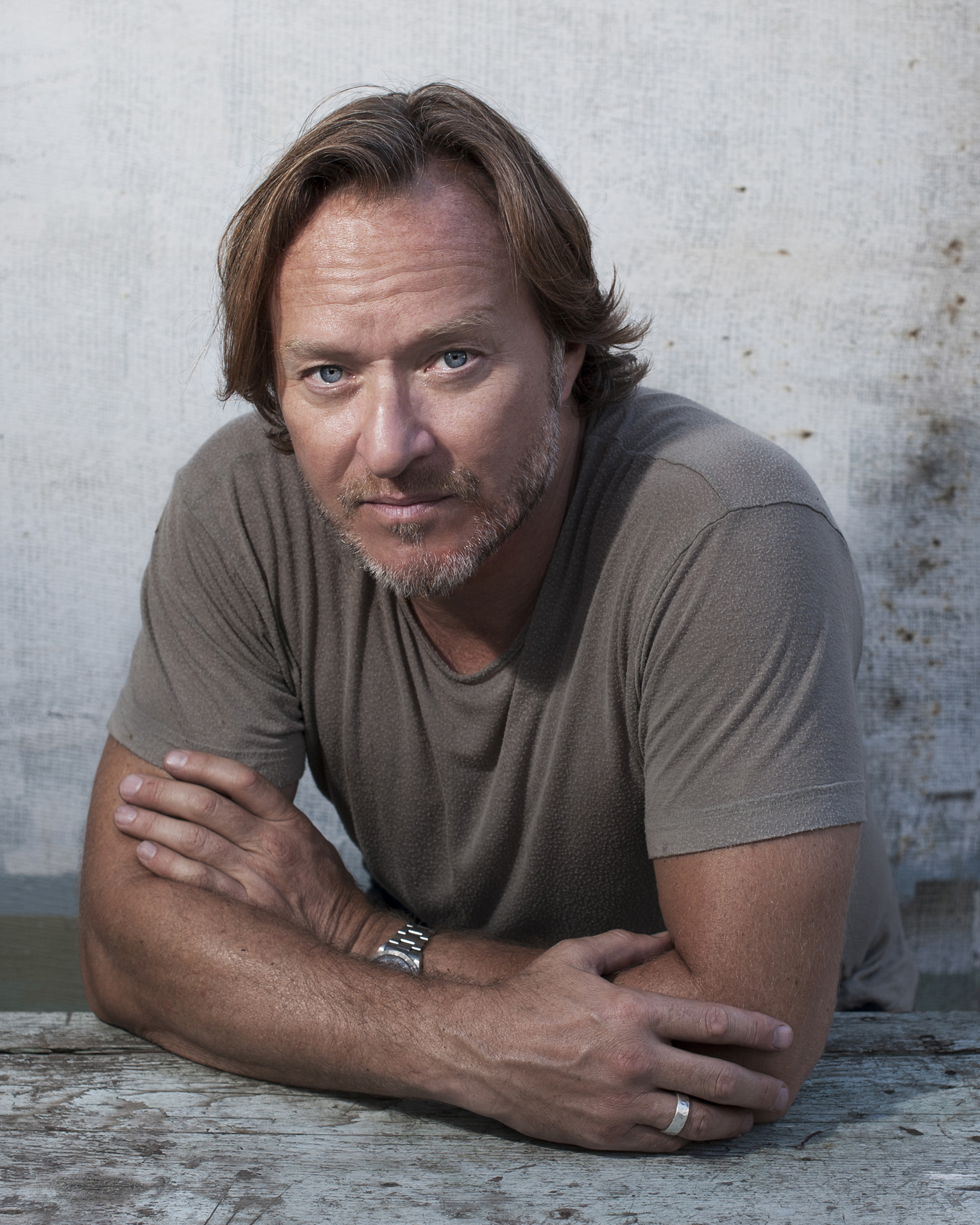
Witkin in 2015

Christian Witkin (born 1966) is an American fashion and portrait photographer, living in New York City. He is known for capturing revealing moments of celebrities, —as well as for his campaigns for Gap Inc., Vanity Fair, and People. His work is described as "iconic, beautiful portraiture defined by a refined yet approachable point of view."

== Early life and education ==
Born to a Dutch mother and an American father in Manchester, England, Witkin was raised in Amsterdam, The Netherlands. During his childhood he was exposed to a wide range of art and culture by his painter father which inspired him to become a photographer. He relocated to New York in 1984 to study photography at Syracuse University.

== Career ==
After University, Witkin moved to New York City, where he began working with Peter Lindbergh, Bruce Weber, and Annie Leibovitz.

In 1993, he was introduced to George Pitts—a photo editor at the then new Vibe magazine—which launched his professional career. During his time at Vibe, Witkin would score critical success and recognition for his work which included capturing musicians and other celebrities in a style that combined intimate portraiture with blazing glamour. Concurrent with this work, a series of street portraits commissioned by New York magazine would also attract plaudits leading to a long association with the organization and entry to working with other magazines. In 1996, The New York Times Magazine included him in its list of the world's leading photographers, 100 Years of Pictures; Whos's Who.

Cultivating a working relationship with Gary Koepke led Witkin to pitching Gap Inc. his concept for a new marketing campaign using rising and iconic celebrities. This concept was implemented at Witkin's studio in Manhattan's Meat Packing District, photographing under a large skylight into a three walled "room" with old planked floors. Met with great popular acclaim, this approach would define Gap's marketing slant for the next eight years. In addition to his work with Hollywood celebrities, Witkin has worked with dancers and dance companies including, Stephen Petronio, Merce Cunningham Dance Company, Paul Taylor Dance Company, American Ballet Theatre, The Royal Ballet, and New York City Ballet.

His work has appeared in most major magazines including: Vogue (American, British, German, Spanish and Japanese editions), Elle, O, The Oprah Magazine, W, Harper's Bazaar, Slate, Vanity Fair, The New York Times, The New York Times Magazine, Interview Magazine, Wall Street Journal, NY Magazine, People Magazine, Women's Health, The London Sunday Times, Arena, and i-D. His advertising clients include Gucci, Gap, Nike, IBM, American Express, Microsoft, Philips, Calvin Klein, and Shinola.

Much of Witkin's distinctive style has been developed during his travels throughout the world—specifically India, Thailand, and Ethiopia—and his willingness to "take himself outside of his comfort zone." For his commercial work, Witkin shoots digitally, while preferring film of different formats—8x10, 4x5, and Rolleiflex; 6x6—for studio work. His oeuvre has been shown in exhibits and museums internationally and—in addition to being collected in catalogs—has been published in a number of books. Witkin is preparing several bodies of work into monographs, notably Ordinary Beauty a book dedicated to female beauty in the form of nudes, portraits and fragments.

== Personal life ==
Witkin's father, American figurative painter and art professor Jerome Witkin, and uncle, American photographer Joel-Peter Witkin, are identical twins. Witkin has a daughter, India Witkin (b.1996). A longtime resident of New York, he relocated to Los Angeles, CA in March 2018.
