= Gary Heffern =

Finnish-American punk singer (1954–2026)

- Born: Veli-Matti Tervaniemi; 20 August 1954; Finland
- Died: c. 18 October 2026 (aged 72) Rovaniemi, Finland
- Genres: Punk Rock; new wave
- Instrument: Vocals
- Formerly of: The Penetrators, The Beautiful People
- Award: San Diego Music Hall of Fame

Gary Heffern (born Veli-Matti Tervaniemi; 20 August 1954 – c. 18 October 2026) was a Finnish and American punk rock musician and poet from San Diego, California.

== Early life and education ==
Heffern was one of eight children born in the rural Lapland region of Finland. His mother was hospitalized for postpartum depression in Helsinki, while his father attempted to work and raise his children alone; eventually, he sent them to an orphanage in Kittilä, adopted from an orphanage in Finland. In 1957, author John C. Caldwell wrote about the Tervaniemi children in a book about the Christian Children's Fund called Children of Calamity. An American family had fallen in love with a picture of Heffern's sister Helena and decided to adopt her. Not wanting her to be alone, they took Veli-Matti, renamed him Gary and took him to Ocean Beach, San Diego.

Heffern spoke openly about being beaten and abused as a child. He graduated from Point Loma High School in 1972.

== Career ==
Heffern was the frontman of the San Diego band Monotone and the Nucleoids, before he was recruited to sing for The Penetrators in the late 1970s. According to the San Diego DJ Jay MicInnes, "They became the top dogs in San Diego around 1980 or ’81." The Penetrators started in the late 1970s, prominent in San Diego but touring steadily throughout the 1980s.

They made their name opening for The Ramones at Montezuma Hall. With the Penetrators, Heffern played shows with the Unknowns, Dick Dale, the Meat Puppets, the Plimsouls, the Plugz, Jim Carroll, Nina Hagen, Mudhoney, the Walkabouts, Iggy Pop, Oingo Boingo, Romeo Void, the B-52s, Robert Gordon, Rubber City Rebels, the Paladins.

They played San Dieguito High School. Eddie Vedder of Pearl Jam attended the show when he was a student there. Vedder later worked with Heffern on an album that also included R.E.M.'s guitarist Peter Buck. Penetrator shows had a reputation for riots. Heffern won a Best Fight award in a year end music column once.

He hosted poetry readings in San Diego attended by John Doe, Keith Morris, Greg Hetson, Roger Pinnell and Luis Güereña.

In the 1980s, he confided in his roommate Mojo Nixon that he was struggling with drugs. Nixon recommended that he close his eyes and put his finger on a map and go there to get himself straight. As a result, he moved to Seattle on Christmas Eve 1984. While there he wrote his own music and organized shows attended by the Walkabouts, Jesse Bernstein, Dave Alvin, Siouxsie Sioux, Jim Carroll, and Henry Rollins. As a solo musician in Seattle, Heffern played shows with Siouxsie and the Banshees, Dave Alvin, and Jeff Buckley.

In 2009, while living in Finland, Heffern formed a band called The Beautiful People.

Heffern published a book of poetry call Unholy Dreams in 2014.

In January 2019, The Penetrators reunited for a final show at the Casbah. Later that month, Heffern played a solo show under the name "Gary Heffern's Last Waltz" at the same place backed by Cindy Lee Berryhill, among others. Open acts included the Dils, Chip Kinman, the Executives and Manual Scan.

== Personal life and death ==
He was married in Seattle but later divorced. When he was 50 years old, he was contacted by his siblings. In 2005, Heffern moved to Finland. He would return to perform in San Diego and elsewhere, but he lived in Finland until his death.

Gary Heffern was found dead at his home in Rovaniemi on 18 October. He was 72.
