= Bart Mendoza =

- Born: September 5, 1962 (age 63)
- Origin: San Diego, California
- Genres: Power pop, blues, rock
- Instruments: guitars (electric, acoustic, bass), piano
- Years active: 1976-present
- Label: none
- Website: The Shambles official site

Bart Mendoza (born September 5, 1962) is an American journalist, musician and songwriter.

== 1980–1990: Bands, fanzines and festivals ==
Mendoza graduated from Muirlands Jr. High School in 1977 and then La Jolla High School in 1980, having played with several bands including Starjammer and the Pedestrians. In 1980 he joined the staff of San Diego music magazine, Kicks, in the credits as working on event listings and their music calendar. From 1981 to 1990, he was frontman and chief songwriter for mod-influenced group Manual Scan. Between 1991 and 2010 he performed with power pop group The Shambles. In 2009 he joined Wendy Bailey & True Stories full-time as guitarist, taking over the frontman role when Bailey took a band sabbatical in early 2012.

As a concert promoter he's helped bring many artists to San Diego, particularly from 1985 to 1991 when Mendoza co-produced a series of music festivals, New Sounds, featuring Mod and sixties oriented groups from the U.S. and Europe. In 1986, Mendoza performed with a one-off band, Boys About Town, at the festival. The band's lineup included Mendoza and British musicians Edward Ball of The Times and Television Personalities, Paul Bevoir of The Jetset and Small Town Parade, as well as Simon Smith of the Merton Parkas and Mood Six. The festival ran until 1991, with a final edition in 1999. He also published a fanzine, Sound Affects, which ran to nine issues and wrote for several modzines, including England's In the Crowd.

During this time frame Mendoza worked for Capitol Records and freelanced for other labels including Chrysalis, Motown, Angel and EMI. He continued to do so through the late 1990s when he began an eight-year stint with Diamond Comics Distributors as assistant manager of the San Diego offices.

Mendoza was also included as a background character in several comic books including the first issue of Ed Brubaker's early 1990s series, Lowlife, with Brubaker concurrently drawing Mendoza and Manual Scan bandmate Kevin Ring for the cover of their album, 79 to 89.

== 1990–1999: Journalism and Blindspot Records ==
Mendoza co-founded the indie label Blindspot Records in 1991, with more than two dozen albums to date including releases from Skelpin, Mark Decerbo & Four Eyes, Skid Roper and others. Mendoza is producer of the compilation series, Staring at the Sun, with twelve volumes to date. A member of the San Diego Music Foundation Board, Mendoza additionally co-produced a series of compilations for the organization. He has also art directed albums for numerous artists including Alicia Previn, The Eddies and Dave Humphries, as well as compilations such as Power Chords, Harmonies and Mistletoe.

During this time frame Mendoza also penned several items for Revolutionary Comics including an insert to The Beatles Experience #6 (1992) and both issues of the two-issue mini series, Rock 'n' Roll Comics: The Best of the British Invasion, (1993). The latter were both collected in a 2010 trade paperback edition by Bluewater Productions.

As a San Diego, California-based journalist he has written for numerous publications, beginning in 1993 with Axcess Magazine and including the local editions of The Reader and San Diego CityBeat, The La Jolla Village News, The Peninsula Beacon and The North Park News as well as The San Diego Union and its weekly arts insert Night & Day. National publications include the second series of Crawdaddy!, while international publications include British Time Out Guides for Southern California and Shindig as well as Spanish rock magazine Ansia De Color. He has also penned liner notes for artists including Phil Angeloff, Ray Brandes, Ryan Ferguson and The Lolas and music compilations such as This is Mod Volume 6, from Cherry Red Records.

In 1999 Mendoza toured Spain three times, once with former Tell Tale Heart frontman Ray Brandes, once with the group, The Riot Act and once with The Shambles. The tours formed the basis of a lengthy feature by author Paul Williams in the San Diego Reader. A poster from the Riot Act's tour of Spain was used as prominent set decoration in several scenes of the film, Bring it On (2000).

== 2000–2010: Songwriting and media ==
Since 1999 Mendoza has had numerous songs he has written or co-written, covered by artists including: Canada's The Kingpins, "Plan of Action", Germany's Daniel Hall, "Survive", Spain's Happy Losers, "Blurs Somewhere" and Los Angeles based band, The Andersons "Rain or Shine."

Between 2002 and 2006 Mendoza co-hosted the XETV television program, Fox Rox, four times. In 2012 he became a guest host on the San Diego Cable television program, So-Cal Showcase.

Meanwhile, Mendoza has continued to promote and book events in the San Diego area, including the Sounds Like San Diego series, with nine editions to date since 2003.

In 2007, Mendoza was part of a quartet of musicians who were interviewed at length about John Lennon in the documentary, Why We Listen, by director Carla Sweet.

In 2010 Mendoza penned the forward to, the Pink Floyd Experience, a comics anthology from Bluewater Productions.

== 2011–present: Music and journalism ==
On June 12, 2011, Mendoza filmed a cameo appearance in a video for Gregory Page's song, "That's You," playing the role of guitarist in the backing combo. Mendoza was the subject of a September 2012 cover story in the San Diego Troubadour. In October 2012, Mendoza provided the commentary track on the DVD release, There Is Nothing Out There, a documentary about the San Diego music community, directed by Craig Rian.

On January 23, 2014, Mendoza took part in an all star tribute to music promoter Tim Mays at the Birch North Park Theatre, performing alongside members of The Penetrators, Rocket From The Crypt, Pinback, Skelpin, The Black Heart Procession, No Knife, Uncle Joe's Big Ol' Driver and many others.

On April 4, 2014, in a special presentation at the Lafayette Hotel, Mendoza was honored along with 40 other prominent San Diego artists, business and community leaders, including El Vez, John Reis, Robin Henkel and Gregory Page. Each had a special banner with their image placed along El Cajon Boulevard.

In May 2014, Mendoza was interviewed on the TV Talk show, Tonight in San Diego (Episode 12), by host David Vaughn, with True Stories also performing two songs on air. He has since performed on air with the house band, The Mondaze in June 2017. Meanwhile, in June 2014, Mendoza appeared on the soundtrack to the Lester Bangs documentary, A Box Full of Rocks, directed by Raul Sandelin, backing Jon Kanis on his track, "It Is and It Isn't" alongside the Shambles.

Mendoza also a contributed an essay to Timothy Gassen's book, Knights of Fuzz: The New Garage & Psychedelic Music Explosion, released in August 2014.

In late 2014 Mendoza regrouped Manual Scan for a pair of performances to promote a best of album, All Night Scan, from Cheap Rewards Records and the band's appearance on the Millions Like Us: The Story of the Mod revival box set from Cherry Red Records. During the same time frame Manual Scan recorded a Mendoza penned theme song for DJ Tim Pyles, heard at the beginning of his Sunday evening Loudspeaker program on XETRA-FM (91X). In December 2015 Manual Scan was one of the headliners at the annual Purple Weekend Festival in Leon, Spain. Meanwhile, Manual Scan released a 10-inch vinyl EP, The Pyles Sessions, produced by Alan Sanderson, to coincide with the show.

In 2015 the Mendoza penned song, "Wouldn't You Like To Be A Bear," by the Shambles, was included in the box set, 40 Years of Bear Family Records, from Germany's Bear Family Records. Following the release of a 7-inch EP of radio sessions, Radio Daze, on Spanish label Bickerton records, in 2016 he and the band appeared in the music documentary series, Cachitos de Hierro y Cromo - in an episode called, YEAH, YEAH!, broadcast on the Spanish television network RTVE.

In 2018 Mendoza contributed an essay to the book, The Scooter Chronicles: A Southern California Modyssey, by Shahriar Fouladi, issued by IDW Publishing / Burger Records.

That same year Mendoza became the music editor for all Local Umbrella Media Newspapers creating the Music Scene SD section found in each issue. In 2021 the column was spun off into a video podcast, Music Scene SDTV. Meanwhile, in 2021, Mendoza signed to Pacific Records, releasing the EP, 66/68. The recording was nominated for "Best Pop Album" at the 2021 San Diego Music Awards.

Mendoza was the recipient of the 2023 Industry Achievement Award at that year's 32nd Annual San Diego Music Awards.

== Partial discography ==
This is a partial discography of albums Bart Mendoza contributes vocals and instrumentation to, or wrote liner notes for.

=== Albums ===
- 1986 Manual Scan - One
- 1987 Manual Scan - Down Lights
- 1994 The Shambles - Clouds All Day
- 1997 Manual Scan - All Night Stand
- 1997 Manual Scan - Plan of Action
- 2000 The Shambles - What You're Missing
- 2002 The Shambles - Chelsea Smiles (and more)
- 2004 The Spring Collection - The Spring Collection
- 2006 Rachael Gordon - Rock 'n' Roll Girl
- 2007 The Anna Troy Band - A Long Way From Home
- 2008 The Spring Collection - In Between
- 2008 The Anna Troy Band - Wait Another Day
- 2008 Dave Humphries - and so it goes...
- 2008 The Shambles - 20 Explosive Hits
- 2008 Los Shambles - Desde Ayer
- 2008 The Anna Troy Band - Live
- 2011 Wendy Bailey & True Stories - String Theory
- 2013 The Shambles - Live at the Casbah
- 2013 Manual Scan - All Night Scan
- 2014 The Jeremy Band - All Over The World
- 2015 Manual Scan - The Pyles Sessions
- 2017 Bart Mendoza - Paris Yesterday (Demos 1996 - 2007)
- 2020 Manual Scan - San Diego Underground Files Volume 1

=== EPs ===
- 1982 Manual Scan - Plan of Action (reissued 2006 Munster Records, 2021 Snap Records)
- 1989 Manual Scan - The Lost Sessions
- 1991 Manual Scan - Days and Maybes
- 1998 The Shambles - Chelsea Smiles (10-inch Record)
- 1999 Rachael Gordon - & The Very Idea
- 2002 The Shambles - It Might Rain Tonight
- 2013 True Stories - Comets Tomorrow
- 2015 The Shambles - Radio Daze
- 2015 True Stories - Pop
- 2021 Bart Mendoza - 66/68
- 2023 True Stories - Capitulo Uno (split w/ Alvino & The Dwells)
- 2023 Manual Scan - Shooting Stars

=== Liner notes ===
- Ray Brandes - The Rise & Fall
- The Event - San Diego Underground Files Volume 2
- Ryan Ferguson - Only Trying to Help
- Folding Mr. Lincoln - s/t
- The Lola's - Like The Sun
- Wayne Riker - Penumbral Sky
- Various Artists - The Young Idea / A Pop Tribute to Anthony Meynell and Squire
- Various Artists - Do You Want To Be In The Show / A Tribute to the Jetset
- Various Artists - I Would Write A Thousand Words / A Tribute to the Television Personalities
- Various Artists - This Is Mod Volume 6

=== Covers ===
- 2009 Forty One Sixty - The Songs of the Shambles

=== Soundtracks ===
- 2014 A Box Full of Rocks: The El Cajon Years of Lester Bangs
