= Gravedigger Five =

American rock band

- Origin: San Diego, California, United States
- Genres: Garage rock, garage punk, rock and roll
- Years active: 1984—1987
- Label: Bomp! Records
- Members: Leighton Koizumi; Ted Friedman; John Hanrattie; Tom Ward; Dave "The Animal" Anderson
- Past members: Chris Gast (deceased)

The Gravedigger Five – often shown as Gravedigger V – was an American garage rock revival band, formed in 1984 in San Diego, California, United States. The band was part of the Paisley Underground, a musical movement centered on Los Angeles, California, which referenced 1960s West Coast pop and garage rock. The band's lineup consisted of Leighton Koizumi on vocals and sound effects, Ted Friedman on lead guitar, John Hanrattie on rhythm guitar and backup vocals, Dave "The Animal" Anderson on drums and percussion, and originally Chris Gast, who was replaced on bass and backing vocals by Tom Ward. When the Gravedigger Five broke up, members of the band went on to form The Morlocks and Manual Scan.

== History ==
The members of the Gravedigger Five began playing together around 1983, practicing under the name "The Shamen" in bassist Chris Gast's garage. The group began writing songs together while its members were still teenagers; lead singer Leighton Koizumi was only sixteen years old when the band began to perform. When the band eventually went on to play the Whisky a Go Go, the band members had to wait outside between sets, as the members were too young to be in the club. The name "The Shamen" was abandoned after the group discovered that the name was already in use by another band, and so after a night of brainstorming, purportedly at a local Bob's Big Boy, the group renamed their band the Gravedigger Five, a take-off on the old "Monster Mash" backing group The Cryptkicker V.

=== All Black and Hairy ===
After only a few performances the group caught the interest of Voxx Records owner Greg Shaw, who signed the band to his imprint in January, 1984. The band recorded their first LP the same year, sleeping together in a car in an alley adjacent to the studio while not recording. Their first LP, All Black and Hairy, was released towards the end of 1984, but even before its release original bassist Chris Gast was ejected from the band as a result of his substance abuse problems. Shortly after Gast's dismissal the rest of the band fell apart and the group disbanded. The band released its entire catalogue posthumously. Following the breakup of the band, Voxx released the band's first LP, "All Black and Hairy," in 1984.

=== The Mirror Cracked ===
In 1987, three years after the breakup of the band, Voxx Records released a second Gravedigger Five LP. Under the title The Mirror Cracked, Voxx packaged a number of unreleased All Black and Hairy session tracks, backed with eight crudely recorded live tracks recorded in 1984. The Gravedigger Five's second release contained a number of cover songs, including the Stoics' "Enough of What I Need" and the Avengers' "Be a Caveman." The LP also contained a version of "No Good Woman," with fellow Paisley Underground alum Paula Pierce of The Pandoras on backing vocals. Lead singer Koizumi took offense to the mediocre way the album was assembled.

=== After the Gravedigger Five ===
After the Gravedigger Five disbanded, Koizumi and Friedman moved to the Bay Area where they founded The Morlocks, another Paisley Underground garage rock revival band which continued the Gravedigger Five sound. Dave Anderson and Tom Ward continued on together in the band Manual Scan, and afterwards Anderson went on to perform with The Trebles, The Answers, The Crawdaddies and Skid Roper. The band reunited for one final show playing CAVESTOMP '99 at the Westbeth Theater Center, 151 Bank Street, NYC on 5 November 1999. The lineup for this show featured original members Leighton Koizumi on lead vocals, Ted Friedman on lead guitar and backing vocals, Chris Gast on rhythm guitar with Kory Cook on drums and percussion and Phillip Plyler on bass guitar and backing vocals. Original member Chris Gast died in Austin TX in 2000.

== Discography ==
=== Studio albums ===
- All Black and Hairy; LP (Voxx, 1984, VXS200.025)

=== Compilations ===
- The Mirror Cracked; LP (Voxx, 1987, VXS200.038)
- All Black And Hairy / The Mirror Cracked; (double album, Voxx/Bomp, 1994, vcd2025)

== Other sources ==
- Stevens, Alan. For The Record: The Gravedigger V Sdcitybeat.com. 2007 Southland Publishing. Accessed July 6, 2007.
- Raggett, Ned. The Mirror Cracked - Album Review. Artistdirect.com. Accessed July 6, 2007.
- Feruglio, Roberto. Leighton's Story "Leighton's Gravediggers and Morlocks Unofficial Page". July 1, 2004. Accessed June 30, 2007.
