= Acetylene (album) =

Studio album by The Walkabouts
- Released: 2005
- Recorded: 2004
- Genres: Alternative rock, alternative country, folk rock, heartland rock
- Length: 52:41
- Label: Glitterhouse
- Producers: Tucker Martine and The Walkabouts

The Walkabouts chronology
Shimmers (2003)	Acetylene (2005)

Professional ratings
Review scores
Source	Rating
Ondarock	7.5/10 stars
Plattentests.de	8/10 stars

Acetylene is a 2005 album by American rock band The Walkabouts. It features themes of anger and chaos.

== Track listing ==
All songs by Chris Eckman.

1. "Fuck Your Fear" – 4:15
2. "Coming up for Air" – 4:06
3. "Devil in the Details" – 4:24
4. "Whisper" – 5:55
5. "Kalashnikov" – 5:31
6. "Have You Ever Seen the Morning?" – 3:56
7. "Northsea Train" – 5:43
8. "Acetylene" – 3:36
9. "Before This City Wakes" – 6:02
10. "The Last Ones" – 9:09

== Musicians ==
- Terri Moeller – drums
- Michael Wells – bass guitar
- Glenn Slater – Minimoog synthesizer, organ, mellotron
- Chris Eckman – vocals, electric guitar
- Carla Torgerson – vocals, electric guitar
- Al DeLoner (of Midnight Choir) – occasionally lead electric guitar, piano, e-bow
