= The Transmissionary Six =

The Transmissionary Six is a country-folk duo composed of Terri Moeller Pearson and Paul Austin, the former a longtime drummer of the Walkabouts, the latter a founding member of the Willard Grant Conspiracy and later a guitarist for the Walkabouts. Between 2002 and 2013 the band – lead vocalist Moeller Pearson and guitarist Austin, augmented by a rotating cast of supporting musicians – released six albums, appeared on numerous compilations, and toured worldwide several times. The group's output over this period is summed up in a best-of release, Songs 2002–2012. The band continued to play locally on occasion in their hometown of Seattle, for the most part on an impromptu and low-key basis. In April 2023, they released their first album in over ten years, Often Sometimes Rarely Never, on the Drums & Wires Recordings label.
