= Jerome Witkin =

American painter

- Born: September 13, 1939 (age 87); Brooklyn, New York, US
- Education: The High School of Music & Art; Skowhegan School of Painting and Sculpture; Cooper Union; Berlin Academy; University of Pennsylvania
- Known for: Painting
- Movement: Social realism
- Children: Christian Witkin
- Family: (twin brother) Joel Peter Witkin
- Awards: Pulitzer Traveling Fellowship; Guggenheim Fellowship

Jerome Witkin (born September 13, 1939) is an American figurative artist whose paintings deal with political, social and cultural themes, along with serious portraiture that melds the sitter's social position with a speaking likeness that reveals inner character. Witkin has been succinctly characterized as "a virtuoso figurative painter whose work mixes elements of the old masters, social realism and Abstract Expressionism ..."

== Biography ==
Witkin was born in Brooklyn, New York, the twin brother of photographer Joel Peter Witkin. At fourteen he entered The High School of Music & Art in New York, and subsequently studied at the Skowhegan School of Painting and Sculpture, Cooper Union, the Berlin Academy, and the University of Pennsylvania. A Pulitzer Traveling Fellowship enabled him to travel, study and further develop in Europe.

After his return to the United States, Witkin received a Guggenheim Fellowship, began exhibiting at galleries in New York and joined the faculty of the Maryland Institute College of Art. He later taught at Manchester School of Art in England, and then the Moore College of Art. In 1971, he became a professor of art at Syracuse University.

== Artwork ==
Witkin's work can be thought of as an interrelationship of three bold explorations:

1. The creation of realistic pictorial form with painterly gestures strongly influenced by his desire to absorb and surmount abstract expressionism. As such, his brush strokes and constructed forms are highly original and worthy of study in themselves.
2. The deep implications of the death of his father, which induced Witkin to explore mortality and the underlying reality of personal and social relationships, which is evident in his portraits and the characterizations in his narrative work.
3. Visually complex "realist" denunciations of major human rights issues as embodied in themes of torture, assassination, AIDS, and the Holocaust. While significant elements of the global contemporary art scene seems fascinated with the relationship between art and fashion, Witkin worked on his Holocaust series for twenty three years, never rushing this serious exploration of the characters perpetrating and victimized by this horror.

While his paintings reference the work of the old masters, social realism, and abstract expressionism, Witkin, in a self-deprecating manner, refers to himself as a "cornball humanist". In a fuller explanation of his motivation, Witkin has emphasized, "If this society continues to the next two thousand years, people will be looking at the twentieth century and saying, 'What did artists do about the strange goings-on?'"

Witkin's work is included in the permanent collections of the Metropolitan Museum of Art, the Uffizi, the Cleveland Museum of Art, and the Hirshhorn Museum.

== Personal life ==
Witkin is the father of photographer Christian Witkin.
