= Let It Roll (Willard Grant Conspiracy album) =

Studio album by Willard Grant Conspiracy
- Released: March 27, 2006
- Recorded: Ljubljana, Slovenia
- Genre: Alt-Country
- Length: 52:26
- Label: Loose Music
- Producer: Robert Fisher

Willard Grant Conspiracy chronology
Regard The End (2003)	Let It Roll (2006)	Pilgrim Road (2008)

Professional ratings
Review scores
Source	Rating
Mojo	4/5 stars

Let It Roll is the 7th full album by alt-country band Willard Grant Conspiracy.

== Musicians ==
As with many of the band's albums it is a collaborative effort with Robert Fisher being joined on this occasion by members of The Walkabouts, Lambchop and Dream Syndicate.

== Track listing ==
1. "From a Distant Shore"
2. "Let It Roll"
3. "Dance With Me"
4. "Skeleton"
5. "Flying Low"
6. "Breach"
7. "Crush"
8. "Mary of the Angels"
9. "Ballad of a Thin Man"
10. "Lady of the Snowline"

All music written by Robert Fisher, except "Flying Low" by Robert Fisher and Steve Wynn, and "Ballad of a Thin Man" by Bob Dylan.
