= New West Motel =

Studio album by the Walkabouts
- Released: 1993
- Genres: Alternative rock, alternative country
- Length: 62:41
- Label: Sub Pop
- Producers: Ed Brooks, the Walkabouts

The Walkabouts chronology
Scavenger (1991)	New West Motel (1993)	Satisfied Mind (1993)

New West Motel is the fifth studio album by alternative rock band the Walkabouts. It was released in 1993 on Sub Pop Records. It is a double album, where all songs are credited to Chris Eckman and The Walkabouts except for a cover of Texan cult musician Townes Van Zandt's "Snake Mountain Blues".

== Critical reception ==
Professional ratings
Review scores
Source	Rating
AllMusic	4/5 stars

Jason Ankeny writing in a positive review for AllMusic said that it features "edgy juxtaposition of blistering guitar workouts and plaintive acoustic cuts."

== Track listing ==
All songs written by the Walkabouts, except where noted. All lyrics written by Chris Eckman, except where noted.

1. "Jack Candy" – 4:41
2. "Sundowner" – 3:38
3. "Grand Theft Auto" – 5:41
4. "Break It Down Gently" – 3:36
5. "Your Hope Shines" – 4:14
6. "Murdering Stone" – 3:18
7. "Sweet Revenge" – 5:44
8. "Glad Nation's Death Song" – 4:21
9. "Long Time Here" – 4:19
10. "Wondertown (Part One)" – 1:23
11. "Drag This River" – 4:02
12. "Snake Mountain Blues" (Townes Van Zandt) – 5:47
13. "Findlay's Motel" (string arrangement by Mark Nichols) – 6:36
14. "Unholy Dreams" – 5:21

The album was produced during November and December 1992. It was engineered at Clearwater Productions, Gig Harbor, Washington and Bad Animals Seattle, Washington.

== Personnel ==
The Walkabouts

- Terri Moeller – drums, percussions, backup vocals
- Bruce Wirth – violin, lap steel guitar, mandolin, vibes
- Glenn Slater – piano, organ, noises, accordion
- Michael Wells – bass, harmonica
- Carla Torgerson – vocals, acoustic guitars, electric guitars, percussion
- Chris Eckman – vocals, acoustic guitars, electric guitars

Bravura String Quartet strings on "Findlay's Motel"

- Steven Toda – violin
- Dave Beck – cello
- Gregg Rice – violin
- Sam Williams – viola

King Jesus Disciples

vocals on "Your Hopes Shines"

- Roosevelt Franklin
- Johnny Gray
- James Young

Additional musicians

- Mark Nichols – conducting of the string arrangement on "Findlay's Motel"

Technical

- The Walkabouts – production
- Ed Brooks – production, engineering
- Kevin Suggs – assistant engineering
- Joe York – assistant engineering
- Jim Haviland – chief technical advisor
- Tony Kroes – pre-production for Second Nature Productions
- Gary Smith – pre-production for Fort Apache
- Paul Kolderie – pre-production for Fort Apache
- John Saba – guitar technician for Stephens Stringed Instruments
- Michael Taponga – drum technician

Design

- Ben Thompson – cover design, cover painting (digital)
- Tony Kroegs – cover painting (analog), band photo
- Kevin Gibson – band photo, shot at the Five-O Tavern.

== Release history ==
Source
Region	Date	Label	Format	Catalog
Germany	1993	Sub Pop Records	2xLP	SP 81/252
Germany	1993	Sub Pop Records	CD	SPCD 81/252, RS-CMD028
Germany	February 19, 1993	Glitterhouse Records	CD	GRCD 252
United States	1993	Creativeman Disc	CD	CMD-028
Greece	1999	ΠΟΠ + POK (Magazine)	CD	GRCD 252
