= Rag & Bone (album) =

EP by The Walkabouts
- Released: February 1, 1990
- Genre: Alternative rock, alternative country
- Length: 23:40
- Label: Sub Pop
- Producer: The Walkabouts, Tony Kroes, Ed Brooks, Steve Fisk

The Walkabouts chronology
Cataract (1989)	Rag & Bone (1990)	Scavenger (1991)

Professional ratings
Review scores
Source	Rating
Allmusic	3/5 stars

Rag & Bone is the third EP by American alternative country band The Walkabouts released on February 1, 1990, through Sub Pop Records.

== Artwork and packaging ==
The cover photo shows a scene in Western Montana. The source is listed in the CD liner notes of the Glitterhouse re-release as anonymous. The LP release included a lyric sheet and a poster. 57 LPs came on orange vinyl.

== Track listing ==
All tracks written by The Walkabouts.

1. "The Anvil Song" – 3:09
2. "Ahead of the Storm" – 3:52
3. "Medicine Hat" – 3:07
4. "Wreck of the old #9" – 3:52
5. "Mr. Clancy" – 3:17
6. "Last Ditch" – 6:23

== Release history ==
Date	Label	Format	Catalog
February 1, 1990	Sub Pop Records	cassette	SP056
February 1, 1990	Sub Pop Records	CD	SP056
February 1, 1991	Sub Pop Records	LP	SP056
April 4, 1990	Glitterhouse Records	CD (reissue with Cataract)	GR 0085

== Personnel ==
- Glenn Slater – organ, piano, noise
- Carla Torgerson – vocals, guitars, cello
- Michael Wells – bass, harmonica
- Grant Eckman – drums, percussion
- Chris Eckman – vocals, guitars, lap steel guitar, mandolin

Additional musicians

- Alan Finston – trombone on "The Anvil Song"
- Bruce Wirth – violin on "Wreck of the old #9"
- Steve Fisk – trains on "Wreck of the old #9"

Technical personnel

- Ed Brooks – production, engineering
- Tony Kroes – production, engineering
- The Walkabouts – production
- Steve Fisk – production & engineering on "Wreck of the old #9"
- Larry Brewer – engineering on "Wreck of the old #9"

Additional personnel

- Charles Peterson – back photo
