= Cataract (Walkabouts album) =

Studio album by the Walkabouts
- Released: March 1, 1989
- Genres: Alternative rock, alternative country
- Length: 38:56
- Label: Sub Pop
- Producers: The Walkabouts, Tony Kroes, Ed Brooks

The Walkabouts chronology
See Beautiful Rattlesnake Gardens (1988)	Cataract (1989)	Rag & Bone (1990)

Cataract is the second studio album by American alternative country band the Walkabouts, released on March 1, 1989, through Sub Pop Records.

== Critical reception ==
Professional ratings
Review scores
Source	Rating
AllMusic	3/5 stars
Spin	positive
Dave Thompson	7/10

Harold DeMuir, for The Trouser Press Record Guide, 4th Ed., wrote, "The full-length Cataract resonates with rueful Americana on such tracks as 'Whiskey XXX', "Hell's Soup Kitchen" and 'Long Black Veil' (not the traditional song), marking The Walkabouts as a distinctive band with loads of potential."

In The Trouser Press Guide to '90s Rock, Scott Schinder wrote: "Cataract and the six-song Rag & Bone (combined as Rag & Bone Plus Cataract, a single CD bearing the EP's original artwork) are more distinctive, mining a richly shadowy strain of Americana."

In a review for the Backlash magazine, Ransom Edison wrote "compared to The Walkabouts' debut album, last year's 'See Beautiful Rattlesnake Gardens,' 'Cataract' is a more refined and consistent effort, pushing the folk influence even further yet exploring a greater variety of musical approaches".

== Track listing ==
All tracks written by The Walkabouts.

1. "Whiskey xxx" – 2:56
2. "Hell's Soup Kitchen" – 3:24
3. "Whereabouts Unknown" – 3:01
4. "End-In-Tow" – 3:23
5. "Bones of Contention" – 4:38
6. "Home as Found" – 2:38
7. "Smokestack" – 3:04
8. "The Wicked Skipper" – 1:38
9. "Drille Terriers" – 2:24
10. "Specimen Days" – 3:44
11. "Long Black Veil" – 5:01
12. "Goodbye (to all That)" – 3:05

=== Release history ===
Date	Label	Format	Catalog
March 1, 1989	Sub Pop Records	LP	SP031
April 4, 1990	Glitterhouse Records	CD (reissue with EP Rag & Bone)	GR 0085

== Personnel ==
- Michael Wells – bass, harmonica
- Carla Torgerson – vocals, guitar, keyboard, cello, percussion
- Grant Eckman – drums, percussion
- Chris Eckman – vocals, guitars, mountain dulcimer, tapes

Additional musicians

- Jonathan Siegel – violin on "Whereabouts Unknown"
- Terry Lee Hale – slide guitar on "Home as Found"
- Carl Miller – trombone on "Smokestack"
- Liv Torgerson – backup vocals on "Drille Terriers"

Technical personnel

- Ed Brooks – production, engineering
- Tony Kroes – production, engineering
- The Walkabouts – production

Additional personnel

- William Forsythe – cover photo "Eddy and Dashdown", September 23, 1933
- Ben Thompson – cover design
