= Manual Scan =

US musical group

- Origin: San Diego, California
- Genres: Mod
- Years active: 1981–1991
- Label: various
- Members: Bart Mendoza (vocals, guitar); Kevin Donaker-Ring (guitar); Jarrod Lucas (drums); Tim Blankenship (bass); David Fleminger (keyboards)
- Past members: Bobby Allend; David Anderson; Ron Friedman; Morgan Young; Yvonne Simon; Anthony Suarez; Thomas Ward; Brad Wilkins; Ritchie "Rooster" Brubaker

Manual Scan was an American mod and power pop group from San Diego, active between 1981 and 1991.

Manual Scan released numerous CDs, LPs and 7-inch singles, in England, Spain and the US. They toured in the US, England (including a 1986 appearance at the 100 Club in London), and Mexico. The group's song "Nothing Can Be Everything" was included in the 1990 Columbia Pictures release, A Girl To Kill For.

== Members ==
The founding members of Manual Scan were guitarist / singer Bart Mendoza, guitarist Kevin Ring, bassist David Fleminger and drummer Paul Kaufman, though within a few months of the band's formation Kaufman was replaced by Paul Brewin and singer Yvonne Simon was added on backing vocals and guitar. All except for Fleminger were former students of La Jolla High School . The band's lineup changed frequently during its existence, with Mendoza and Donaker-Ring as the core members. Other notable players included drummer David Anderson and Tom Ward, both formerly of Voxx Records group Gravedigger Five.

Guests of note include Anthony Meynell, frontman for British mod revival trio Squire, who the band backed in 1985 and Jeff Conolly of garage rockers Lyres who sat in with Manual Scan for six shows in 1989.

== Post-split activities and reunions ==
Following the demise of the band Donaker-Ring co-founded power pop group, The Shambles in 1992, with Mendoza joining shortly after. Manual Scan has reunited several times since 2005, recording a live session on 28 January 2010 with producer Alan Sanderson for San Diego-based radio station, KBZT (FM94/9). A best of collection, All Night Scan, was released only on vinyl and as a digital download, in September 2013 by Texas-based Cheap Reward Records.

Meanwhile, the band, now featuring original members Mendoza, Ring and Fleminger with the addition of bassist Tim Blankenship (formerly of Atlantic Records artists, Rust and indie rock band, Creedle) and drummer Jarrod Lucas (formerly of the Dragons) reunited in late 2014 for a show in San Diego promoting their appearance on the box set, Millions Like Us - The Story of the Mod Revival, released on 6 December by British label, Cherry Red Records.

A new album, The Pyles Sessions, composed of radio sessions recorded for Pyles show as well as demos was issued by Spain's SNAP! Records, to coincide with the show. Meanwhile, the bands "Tim Pyles Theme" has been released on a five track 7-inch EP, Sounds of the Stratosphere, issued by Blindspot Records.

Manual Scan staged a 40th Anniversary show, celebrating the 1976 meeting of the frontline team of Mendoza and Ring, at the 2016 Adams Avenue Street Fair, with guest performers including Johnny Vernazza (The Elvin Bishop Group), Chris Davies (The Penetrators) and Samuel Martinez (The Bassics).

== Partial discography ==
=== Albums ===
- 1986 One (England / Hi-Lo)
- 1988 Down Lights (U.S. / Susstones)
- 1997 Plan of Action (Spain / Snap!)
- 1997 All Night Stand (U.S. / Get Hip Records 1043)
- 2013 All Night Scan (U.S. / Cheap Rewards Records CRR-009) vinyl and digital only
- 2015 The Pyles Sessions (Spain / Snap!) 10-inch Vinyl and CD
- 2020 San Diego Underground Files Vol. 1 (Spain / Bickerton)

=== E.P.'s ===
- 1982 Plan of Action (U.S./ Dance & Stance – PS) 7" vinyl. Reissued in 2006 by Munster Records / Spain, 2022 by SNAP! Records / Spain
- 1989 The Lost Sessions (U, S. / Get Hip 116 - PS) 7" vinyl. Commercial copies available on black vinyl. Promo copies are blue vinyl
- 1991 Days & Maybes (U.S. / Susstones IMS 548 - PS) 7" vinyl. Second print with over sleeve.
- 2023 Shooting Stars (U.S. / Pacific Records 129 - PS) CD and Digital

=== Singles ===
- 2023 David May (U.S. / Outro Records - PS) 7" Vinyl

=== Flexi Discs ===
- 1986 "And We Still Feel The Same" and "Plan of Action" were included on a cover mounted flexi disc with British modzine, In The Crowd No.18, alongside a track by the Risk.

=== Compilation appearances ===
- 1985 The Cutting Edge (England / Razor S16, LP) – Jungle Beat (remix)
- 1986 American Heart & Soul (England / Hi Lo Records LO-6, LP) – New Song
- 1987 The Phase III Mod Bands (England / Unicorn, 7-inch EP) 31968
- 1997 It’s A Mod, Mod World (England / Antenna Records, CD) – New Song, Confidence and Love
- 1999 This Is Mod Volume 6 (England / Cherry Red, CD) – American Way, Nothing You Can Do, Jungle Beat, Anymore, New Difference
- 2014 Millions Like Us: The Story of the Mod Revival (England / Cherry Red, CD Box Set) – Nothing You Can Do
- 2015 Sounds of the Stratosphere (U.S. / Blindspot, 7-inch EP) – The Tim Pyles Theme + tracks by Satanic Puppeteer Orchestra, Blaise Guld, Pony Death Ride and Super Buffett
- 2017 Staring at the Sun XII (U.S. / Blindspot, CD) – The Loudspeaker Theme
