= Joel-Peter Witkin =

American photographer

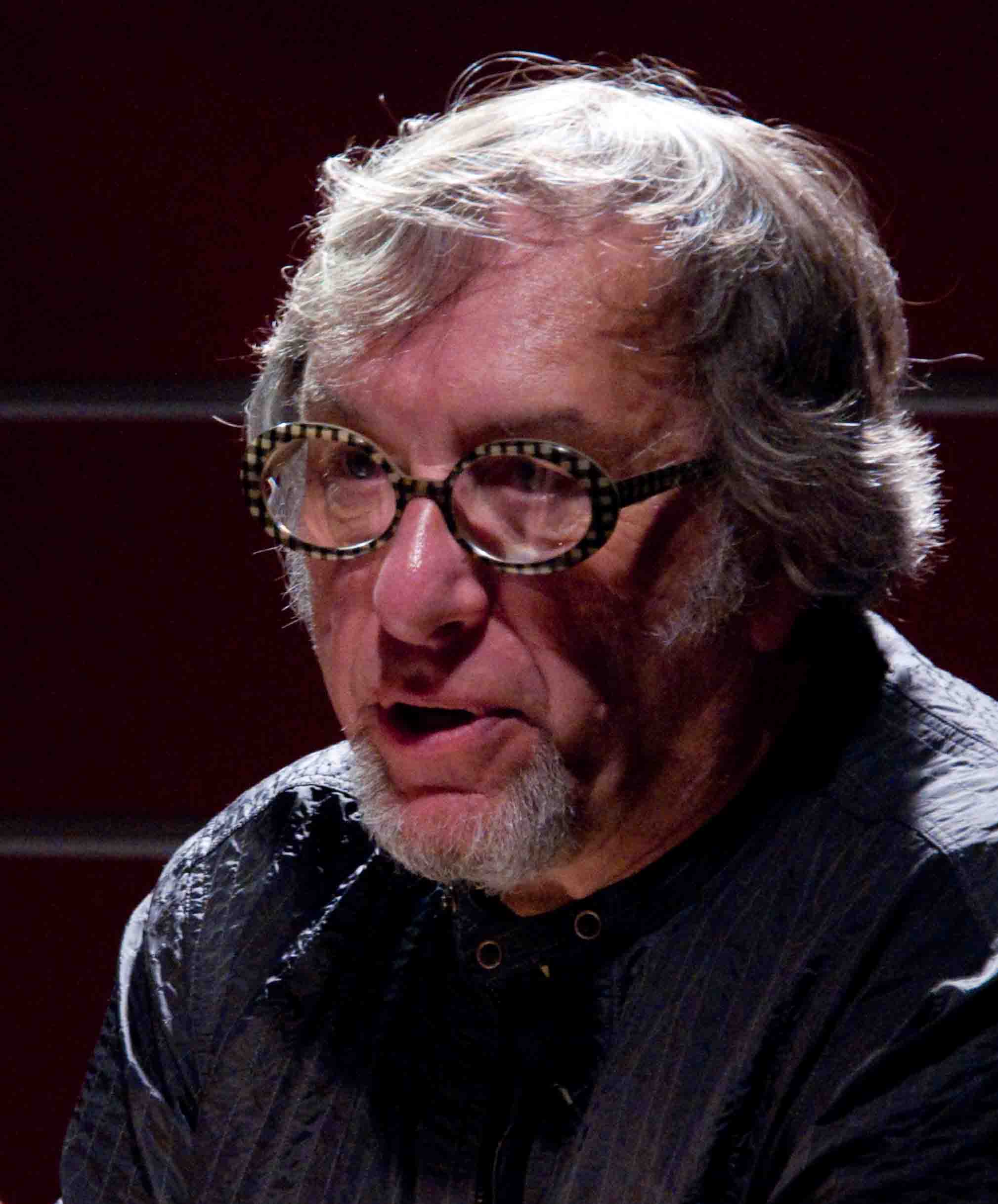
- Witkin in 2009
- Born: September 13, 1939 (age 87); Brooklyn, New York City
- Occupation: Photographer
- Family: Jerome Witkin (identical twin brother)
- Website: www.joelpeterwitkin.com

Joel-Peter Witkin (born September 13, 1939) is an American photographer who lives in Albuquerque, New Mexico. His work often deals with themes such as death, corpses (and sometimes dismembered portions thereof), often featuring ornately decorated photographic models, including people with dwarfism, transgender and intersex persons, as well as people living with a range of physical features. Witkin is often praised for presenting these figures in poses which celebrate and honor their physiques in an elevated, artistic manner. Witkin's complex tableaux vivants often recall religious episodes or classical paintings.

== Biography ==
Witkin was born to a Jewish father and Roman Catholic mother. His twin brother, Jerome Witkin, and son Kersen Witkin, are painters. Witkin's parents divorced when he was young because they were unable to overcome their religious differences. He attended grammar school at Saint Cecelia's in Brooklyn and went on to Grover Cleveland High School.

In 1961, Witkin enlisted in the United States Army, with the intention of capturing war photography during the Vietnam War. However due to scheduling conflicts, Witkin never saw combat in Vietnam. Witkin spent his military service at Fort Hood, Texas, and was mostly in charge of Public Information and classified photos.

In 1967, he became the official photographer for City Walls Inc. He attended Cooper Union in New York, where he studied sculpture, attaining a Bachelor of Arts degree in 1974. Columbia University granted him a scholarship for graduate school, but his Master of Fine Arts degree is from the University of New Mexico in Albuquerque.

== Influences and themes ==
Witkin claims that his artistic vision springs from an episode he witnessed as a young child, an automobile accident in front of his house in which a little girl was decapitated.

It happened on a Sunday when my mother was escorting my twin brother and me down the steps of the tenement where we lived. We were going to church. While walking down the hallway to the entrance of the building, we heard an incredible crash mixed with screaming and cries for help. The accident involved three cars, all with families in them. Somehow, in the confusion, I was no longer holding my mother's hand. At the place where I stood at the curb, I could see something rolling from one of the overturned cars. It stopped at the curb where I stood. It was the head of a little girl. I bent down to touch the face, to speak to it – but before I could touch it someone carried me away

He says his family's difficulties also influenced his work. His favorite artist is Giotto. His photographic techniques draw on early Daguerreotypes and on the work of E. J. Bellocq.

Those of Witkin's works which use corpses have had to be created in Mexico to get around restrictive US laws. Because of the transgressive nature of the contents of his images, his works have been labelled exploitative and have sometimes shocked public opinion.

His techniques include scratching the negative, bleaching or toning the print, and using a hands-in-the-chemicals printing technique. This experimentation began after seeing a 19th-century ambrotype of a woman and her ex-lover who had been scratched from the frame.

Joel-Peter Witkin's photograph Sanitarium inspired the final presentation of Alexander McQueen's Spring/Summer 2001 collection based on avian imagery, the walls of another box within the faux psychiatric ward collapsed to reveal a startling tableau vivant: a reclining, masked nude breathing through a tube and surrounded by fluttering moths.

== Documentary films ==
In 2011, filming began on the feature-length documentary, Joel-Peter Witkin: An Objective Eye. The film, directed by Thomas Marino, examines Witkin's life and photographs. Along with interviews with Witkin, the film includes interviews from gallery owners, artists, photographers, and scholars who share insight into the impact of Witkin's work and influence on modern culture. The film was released in 2013. It will be part of the permanent collections at the Bibliothèque nationale de France in Paris, and the Biblioteca Nacional de Chile in Santiago, Chile.

Joel-Peter Witkin: An Objective Eye was first publicly shown in Santiago, Chile at the Biblioteca Nacional de Chile in 2013, as part of the opening of the exhibition, Vanitas: Joel-Peter Witkin en Chile.

In 2017, a documentary about him and his brother, Jerome Witkin, was made by Trisha Ziff, entitled Witkin and Witkin.

== Publications ==
- Gods of Heaven and Earth. Twelvetrees, 1989. ISBN 9780942642391.
- Joel-Peter Witkin, Twelve Photographs in Gravure (1994)
- Harms Way: Lust and Madness, Murder and Mayhem. Twin Palms, 1994. ISBN 9780944092286.
- Joel-Peter Witkin: a Retrospective. Scalo: 1995. ISBN 978-1881616207.

== Exhibitions ==
=== Solo exhibitions ===
- Joel-Peter Witkin: Forty Photographs, Brooklyn Museum, Brooklyn, New York, 1986; La Jolla Museum of Contemporary Art, San Diego, CA, 1987
- "Joel-Peter Witkin", Museum of Modern Art-Haifa 1991.
- Vanitas: Joel-Peter Witkin en Chile, Biblioteca Nacional de Chile, Santiago, 2013. Joel-Peter Witkin: An Objective Eye documentary premiered at the opening of this exhibition.

=== Group exhibitions ===
- Bodies, Fotografiska Museum, Stockholm, 2010
- Heaven or Hell, Bibliothèque nationale de France, Paris, 2012

== Collections ==
Witkin's work is held in the following permanent collections:

- Art Institute of Chicago, Chicago, IL: 7 prints (as of 28 March 2023)
- High Museum of Art, Atlanta, GA: 1 print (as of 28 March 2023)
- J. Paul Getty Museum, Los Angeles, CA: 7 prints (as of 28 March 2023)
- Library of Congress, Washington, D.C.
- Los Angeles County Museum of Art, Los Angeles, CA: 6 prints (as of 28 March 2023)
- Museo Nacional Centro de Arte Reina Sofía, Madrid, Spain: 3 prints (as of 28 March 2023)
- Philadelphia Museum of Art, Philadelphia, PA: 7 prints (as of 28 March 2023)
- Princeton Art Museum, Princeton, NJ: 24 works (as of 28 March 2023)
- San Francisco Museum of Modern Art, San Francisco, CA: 4 prints (as of 28 March 2023)
- Smithsonian American Art Museum, Washington, D.C.: 2 prints (as of 28 March 2023)
- Stedelijk Museum, Amsterdam, Holland
- Whitney Museum, New York: 1 print (as of 26 March 2023)

== Films about Witkin ==
- Joel-Peter Witkin: An Objective Eye (2013) – feature-length documentary directed by Thomas Marino
- Witkin and Witkin (2017) – feature-length documentary directed by Trisha Ziff, about Witkin and his brother Jerome
