= Alan Sanderson =

American recording engineer, producer, and studio owner

- Born: May 9, 1970 (age 56)
- Origin: Milan, Italy
- Occupations: Recording engineer, record producer, mixing engineer
- Years active: 1992–present

Alan Sanderson is a recording engineer, mixer, music producer, studio owner based in Southern California.

Sanderson begun his career working on some of the most successful albums of the 1990–2000s while working as an engineer at Cello and Ocean Way Studios in Hollywood, California. Some of the artists Sanderson has recorded include Fleetwood Mac, Michael Jackson, Elton John, Fiona Apple, B.B. King, Counting Crows, Elvis Costello, Ziggy Marley, Ryan Adams and Weezer.

In 1997 he was an engineer on the Rolling Stones album Bridges to Babylon.

Sanderson developed his recording engineering experience at Ocean Way Recording in Hollywood. While working at the studio, he participated in the recording of a full choir for Michael Jackson's album HIStory: Past, Present and Future, Book I. He also worked on recording projects involving The Rolling Stones, B.B. King and Fleetwood Mac.

On February 13, 2011, Sanderson earned a Grammy for his participation in the recording of the 2009 album Hello Hurricane by the musical group Switchfoot.

Since 2014, Sanderson has owned and operated Pacific Beat Recording Studio in San Diego, California, formerly Seacoast Studios.
