= The Walkabouts =

American rock band (1984–2015)

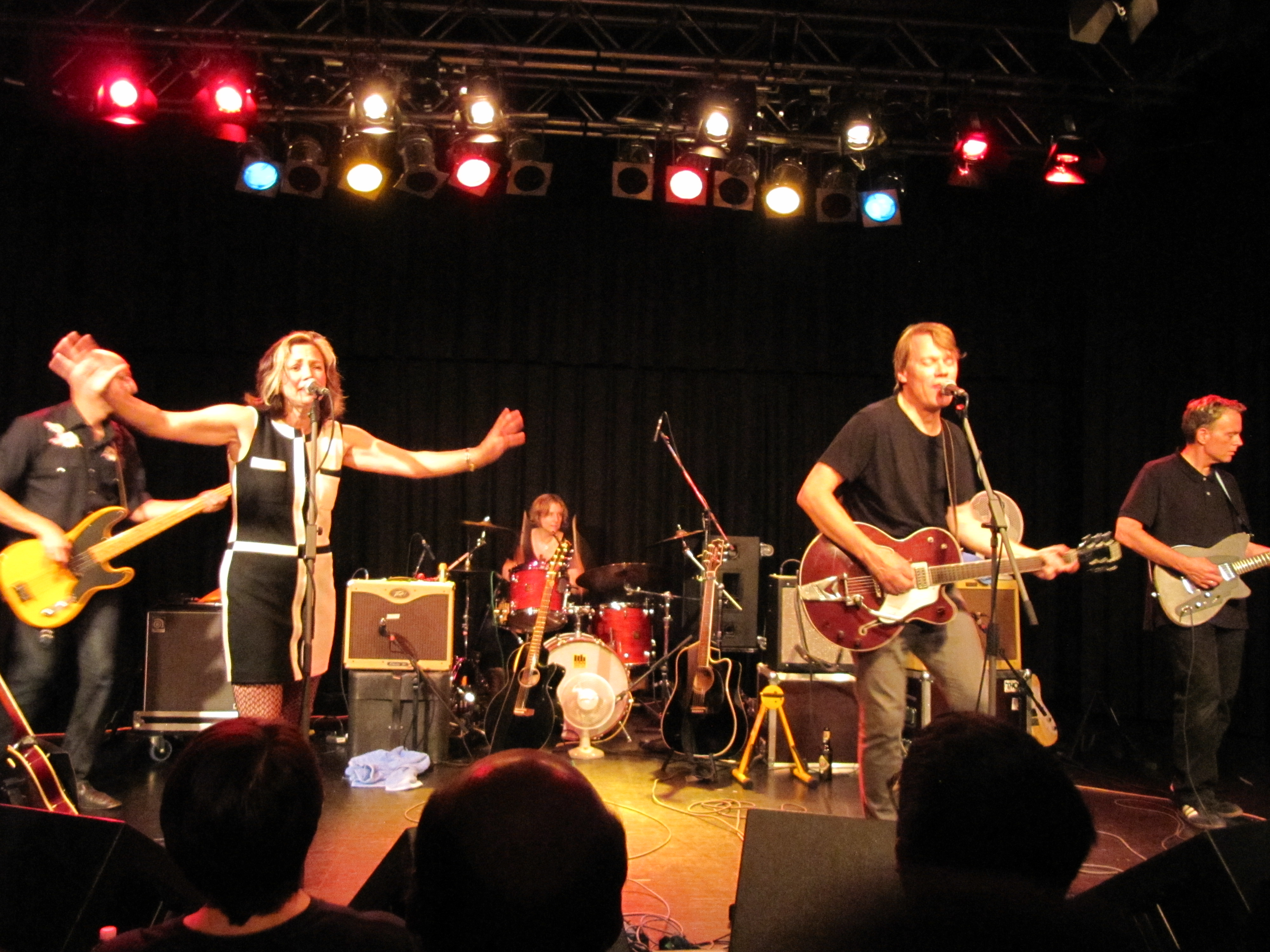
- The Walkabouts in 2012

Background information
- Origin: Seattle, Washington, U.S.
- Genres: Indie rock, alternative rock, alt-country, folk rock, chamber pop, slowcore
- Years active: 1984–2015
- Labels: Sub Pop, Virgin, Glitterhouse, PopLlama, Fire & Skill Recordings, Innerstate Records
- Spinoffs: Chris & Carla
- Members: Chris Eckman; Carla Torgerson; Michael Wells; Glenn Slater; Terri Moeller; Paul Austin
- Past members: Grant Eckman; Curt Eckman; Bruce Wirth; John Baker Saunders; Fred Chalenor; Joe Skyward; Brian Young
- Website: www.thewalkabouts.com

The Walkabouts were an American rock band formed in Seattle, Washington in 1984. The core members were vocalist Carla Torgerson and vocalist and songwriter Chris Eckman. Although the rest of the lineup changed occasionally, for most of the time the other members were Michael Wells, Glenn Slater and Terri Moeller.

The band drew inspiration from folk and country music, particularly Townes Van Zandt, Neil Young and Johnny Cash, but also from other types of artists and musical styles such as Scott Walker, Leonard Cohen, French chanson and Jacques Brel. Their sound was typically rich, with string arrangements and keyboards in addition to the standard rock instruments.

The Walkabouts achieved commercial success and a strong fanbase in Europe, where they had done promotion and extensive touring starting from the early 1990s. They occasionally even made it high on the record charts in countries such as Greece and Norway.

== History ==
Carla Torgerson and Chris Eckman met and began playing music together in 1983 while attending Whitman College in Walla Walla, Washington. In 1984, they moved to Seattle, and the band was born when they joined forces with Chris' two younger brothers, drummer Grant and bassist Curt. The Eckman brothers had been playing in various punk rock and pop groups during their college years, and Carla came from a folk and street singing background. The band took their name from Nicolas Roeg's cult film, Walkabout.

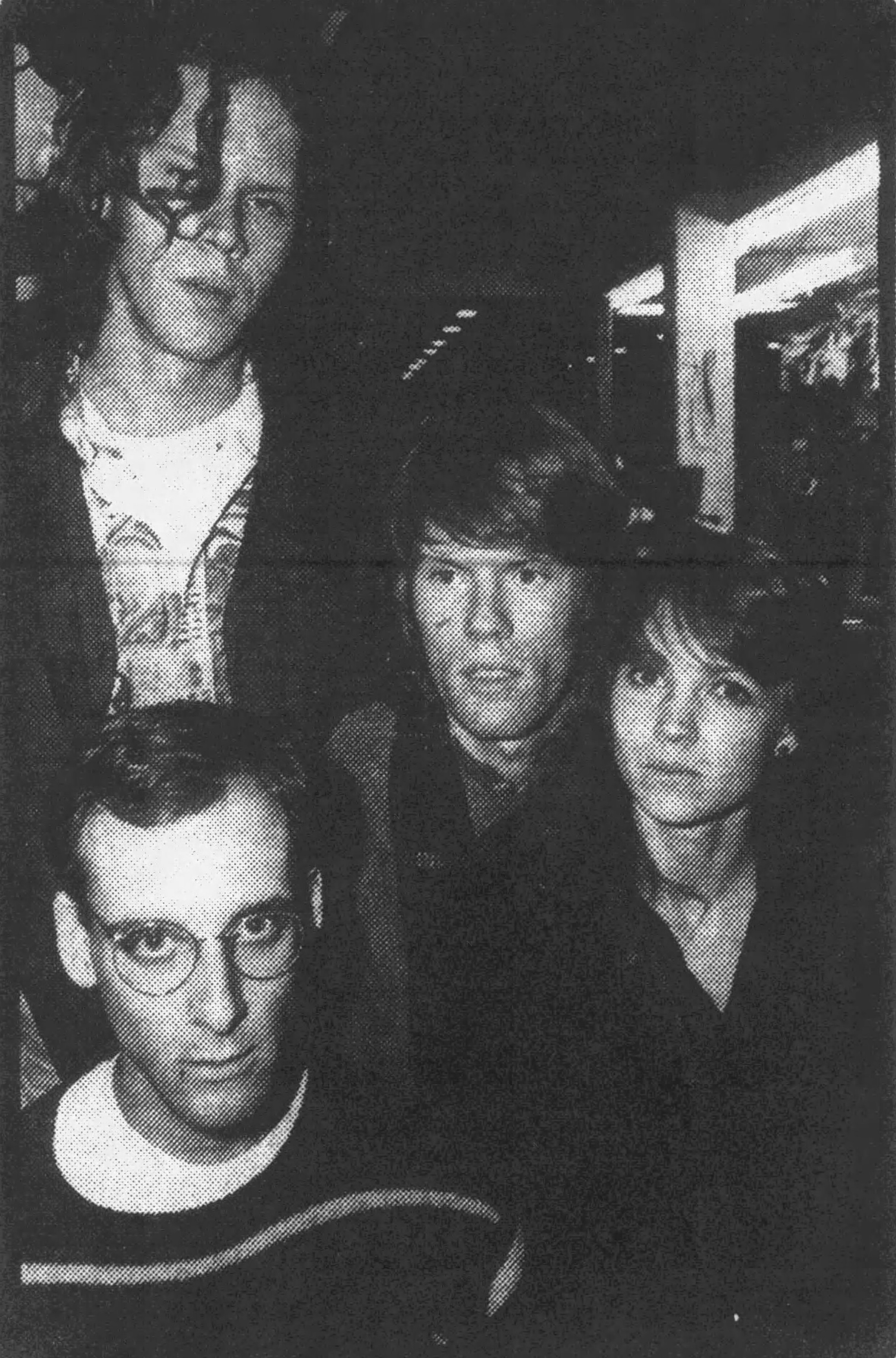
The Walkabouts in 1986

They released their first EP, 22 Disasters, in early 1985. Curt Eckman then left the band, to be replaced by Michael Wells. Their second EP, Linda Evans/Cyclone, was released in 1987. The following year they released their first album, See Beautiful Rattlesnake Gardens, on the PopLlama label, before being signed by Sub Pop as that label's first non-grunge band. Adding keyboard player and multi-instrumentalist Glenn Slater, they released three albums on Sub Pop over the next few years - Cataract (1989), Rag & Bone (1990), and Scavenger (1991). They also toured extensively, particularly in Europe. In 1992 they left Sub Pop Seattle, but remained with Sub Pop Europe who issued three more albums, New West Motel (1993), Satisfied Mind (1993), and Setting the Woods on Fire (1994). Drummer Terri Moeller replaced Grant Eckman in 1992, when he left to care for his newborn son, Dakota Eckman.

Satisfied Mind was their first of several albums largely or wholly comprising songs originally written and recorded by an eclectic variety of other artists, including Nick Cave, Charlie Rich, Johnny Rivers, Patti Smith, Mary Margaret O'Hara, and Gene Clark. Their 1996 collection of unreleased songs, Death Valley Days, also included songs by Neil Young, Nick Drake and Bob Dylan, and in 2000 they issued Train Leaves at Eight, which broadened the approach further by including songs by European artists including Mikis Theodorakis, Goran Bregović, Jacques Brel and Neu!.

In 1995, the band signed with Virgin Records in Germany and released Devil's Road (1996) - recorded in part with the Warsaw Philharmonic - and Nighttown (1997), leading to new levels of success in Europe. The video for "The Light Will Stay On", the lead single from Devil's Road was in heavy rotation on MTV Europe. Starting in 1996, Michael Wells left the band for several years, rejoining in 2003. He was replaced in quick succession by bassists John Baker Saunders, Fred Chalenor and Joe Skyward. In 1999, they moved to the German record label, Glitterhouse Records (the successor to Sub Pop Europe), and released Trail of Stars (1999), Train Leaves at Eight (2000), Ended Up a Stranger (2001), Slow Days with Nina (2003) - an EP tribute to Nina Simone - and Acetylene (2005). During that period of time, Terri Moeller took a break from the band in 2000, and was replaced by Brian Young until she returned in 2001.

In 2010, guitarist Paul Austin joined the band and work began on a new album entitled Travels in the Dustland, released the following year to strong reviews that also hailed the band's return to activity after a six year absence. During the subsequent European tour, the live album Berlin was recorded and released.

In 2015, Eckman confirmed in an interview with Uncut magazine, and in a subsequent Facebook post, that The Walkabouts had disbanded. Eckman continues to write and record with a number of projects, as well as serve as label manager for the global sounds imprint Glitterbeat.

== Side projects ==
Eckman and Torgerson have released albums as side projects under the name "Chris & Carla" and as solo artists.

Carla Torgerson has worked with Greek musician Akis Boyatzis and his band Sigmatropic on their album 16 Haiku & Other Stories (2001). Later Torgerson released a solo album Saint Stranger (2004) with help of Akis Boyatzis.

Between 1996 and 2003, Chris Eckman worked with Norwegian band Midnight Choir and teamed with Al DeLoner of Midnight Choir in electronica-project called "Höst" for an album The Damage Suite (2001). Also Eckman has worked with Willard Grant Conspiracy on the albums Regard the End (2003) and Let It Roll, as well as with The Bambi Molesters. Eckman is also a member of the trio Dirtmusic along with Chris Brokaw and Hugo Race and he has worked with the band Tamikrest from Mali. These two acts toured Europe as a double bill in the spring of 2010. Eckman has worked with Tosca on projects including the song "John Lee Huber", and with Rupert Huber of Tosca on the album L/O/N/G.

Terri Moeller has formed The Beltanes with Eric Alton, formerly of X-15, releasing one cassette EP, entitled Love Punks (1990), and The Transmissionary Six with Paul Austin, formerly of Willard Grant Conspiracy. She released a solo CD under the pseudonym Terri Tarantula in 2010.

== Band members ==
Name	Playing	Member period
Chris Eckman	Vocals, guitar, piano	1984–2015
Carla Torgerson	Vocals, guitar	1984–2015
Michael Wells	Bass guitar	1985–1996; 2003–2015
Glenn Slater	Keyboards, piano	1989–2015
Terri Moeller	Drums, percussion	1991–1999; 2001–2015
Paul Austin	Guitar	2011–2015
Grant Eckman	Drums, percussion	1984–1991
Curt Eckman	Bass	1984–1985
Bruce Wirth	Violin, lap steel, mandolin, vibes	1991–1994
John Baker Saunders	Bass guitar	1996–1999; his death
Fred Chalenor	Bass guitar	1999; died 2018
Joe Skyward	Bass guitar	2000–2002; died 2016
Brian Young	Drums	2000

== Discography ==
=== EPs ===
- 22 Disasters (1985 - Necessity Records - produced by Terry Date & the Walkabouts)
- Rag & Bone (1990 - Sub Pop - produced by Tony Kroes, Ed Brooks & the Walkabouts)
- Slow Days with Nina (2003 - Shingle Street Records) - tribute to Nina Simone

=== Studio albums ===
Title	Album details	Peak positions			
Title	Album details	SWE	BEL (FL)	NOR	GER
See Beautiful Rattlesnake Gardens	Released: 1988; Label: PopLlama; Producer: Tony Kroes, Ed Brooks & the Walkabouts	—	—	—	—
Cataract	Released: 1989; Label: Sub Pop; Producer: Tony Kroes, Ed Brooks & the Walkabouts	—	—	—	—
Scavenger	Released: 1991; Label: Sub Pop; Producer: Gary Smith	—	—	—	—
New West Motel	Released: 1993; Label: Sub Pop; Producer: Ed Brooks & the Walkabouts	—	—	—	—
Satisfied Mind	Released: 1993; Label: Sub Pop; Producer: Kevin Suggs & the Walkabouts	—	—	—	—
Setting the Woods on Fire	Released: 1994; Label: Sub Pop; Producer: Ed Brooks & the Walkabouts	—	—	—	—
Devil's Road	Released: 1996; Label: Virgin, Germany; Producer: Victor Van Vugt	41	—	—	53
Nighttown	Released: 1997; Label: Virgin, Germany; Producer: Victor Van Vugt	—	46	37	75
Trail of Stars	Released: 1999; Label: Glitterhouse; Producer: Phill Brown & the Walkabouts	—	—	30	61
Train Leaves at Eight	Released: 2000; Label: Glitterhouse; Producer: Kevin Suggs & Walkabouts	—	—	—	—
Ended Up a Stranger	Released: 2001; Label: Glitterhouse; Producer: Larry Crane, Phill Brown & the Walkabouts	—	—	—	—
Acetylene	Released: 2005; Label: Glitterhouse; Producer: Tucker Martine & the Walkabouts	—	—	—	87
Travels in the Dustland	Released: 2011; Label: Glitterhouse	—	92	—	—
"—" denotes releases that did not chart

=== Compilations ===
- Death Valley Days: Lost Songs and Rarities, 1985–1995 (1996 – Glitterhouse) – Rare or previously unreleased songs 1985–1995
- Watermarks: Selected Songs, 1991 to 2002 (2002 – Innerstate) – An anthology featuring the best of the Walkabouts from their Sub Pop, Glitterhouse, and Virgin releases 1991-2002
- Drunken Soundtracks: Lost Songs and Rarities, 1995–2001 (2002 – Glitterhouse) – Rare or previously unreleased songs 1995–2001, 2-CDs set
- Shimmers (2003 – Glitterhouse) – An anthology featuring the best of the Walkabouts from their Sub Pop, Glitterhouse and Virgin releases 1993-2001
- Got No Chains / The Songs of The Walkabouts (2009 – Glitterhouse) – Remastered versions of 15 Walkabouts songs + those same 15 songs performed by others - a tribute disc - 2-CDs set

=== DVDs ===
- Life: The Movie Collected Films & Clips (2012 - Glitterhouse) - Contains "Live in Prague" video (same concert as in Prague bootleg), "Tracking The Walkabouts", a 40-minute "on-the-road" documentary, "Walkie Talkie", 40 minutes of interview footage and all nine official video clips

=== Singles ===
Year of release	Title	Comment
1987	"Linda Evans" / "Cyclone"	Necessity Records - produced by Bruce Calder, Tony Kroes & the Walkabouts
1991	"Where the Deep Water Goes"	
1992	"Dead Man Rise"	
1993	"Jack Candy"	
1993	"Your Hope Shines"	
1994	"Good Luck Morning"	
1996	"The Light Will Stay On"	
1996	"All for This"	
1997	'Lift Your Burdens Up'	Not officially released
1997	'Immaculate'	Not officially released
1999	"Drown"	
2005	"Devil in the Details"	Adopted by Jack Wolfskin for advertising

=== Official bootlegs ===
List of official bootlegs (sold at concerts) and mail order only releases (released on the German label Glitterhouse Records).

Year of release	Title	Comment
1995	To Hell and Back - Live in Europe	mail order only (GRCD 356)
1997	Mystery Mountain Chronicles	official bootleg
1999	Airmail	official bootleg
2000	Bruxelles w/ the Nighttown Orchestra	mail order only (GRCD 505)
2002	I'm Sorry	official bootleg
2003	Emona	From the Italian music magazine, "Mucchio Extra"
2005	No You Won't	official bootleg
2007	Prague	mail order only (GRCD 669)
2012	Reuters - Live 1996 & 2006	official bootleg
