= San Diego Music Awards =

American music award

- Location: San Diego, California
- Country: United States

The San Diego Music Awards is an awards show held annually in San Diego, California, United States, to recognize the best artists and bands in local music. The awards show benefits the San Diego Music Foundation, a non-profit organization dedicated to promoting San Diego music education programs.

The show has featured awards in a variety of categories covering nearly every genre of music, and featured live performances by such major-label recording artists as Blink-182, Switchfoot, Jason Mraz, P.O.D., Pierce the Veil, as well as lesser known up-and-coming artists, such as Schizophonics, The Beat Farmers, Gilbert Castellanos, Whitney Shay and others.

Through 2025, the annual awards have raised over $915,000 for its Guitars for Schools program, which has provided free instruments and lessons for more than 75,000 students across San Diego County over the past three decades.

== Country Dick Montana Lifetime Achievement Award ==
Each year the San Diego Music Awards honors an outstanding musician with the Country Dick Montana Lifetime Achievement Award. The award is named for the late drummer Dan McLain's alias in the band, The Beat Farmers. Two awards were given in 1997, 1998, 2000, 2002 and 2004. Since 2014 a special Lifetime Industry Achievement Award has also been issued on occasion.

- 2026 - Steve Poltz
- 2025 - Nathan East
- 2024 - Stevie Salas (Inducted by Matt Sorum)
- 2023 - Mike Keneally
- 2022 - Jesse Davis
- 2021 - Jerry Raney (of The Beat Farmers)
- 2020 - Richard Livoni
- 2019 - Joe Flammini (inducted by Jason Mraz)
- 2018 - The Paladins
- 2017 - Wayne Riker
- 2015 - Peter Sprague
- 2014 - Tomcat Courtney
- 2013 - Daniel Jackson
- 2012 - Mike Wofford
- 2011 - The Penetrators
- 2010 - Iron Butterfly (Inducted by San Diego Mayor Jerry Sanders (politician))
- 2009 - The Zeros (American band) (Inducted by Wayne Kramer)
- 2008 - Mundell Lowe
- 2007 - Nick Reynolds (of The Kingston Trio)
- 2006 - Jimmie & Jeannie Cheatham
- 2005 - The Farmers
- 2004 - Charles McPherson & The Scottsville Squirrel Barkers
- 2003 - Joe Marillo
- 2002 - Jack Tempchin & Al Guerra
- 2001 - Jack Costanzo
- 2000 - Lou Curtiss & Barney Kessel
- 1999 - Frankie Laine
- 1998 - Joey Harris & Mike Halloran
- 1997 - Tim Mays & Harlan Schiffman
- 1996 - Jim McInnes
- 1995 - Dave Hodges
- 1994 - Malcolm Falk

== Industry Achievement Award ==
- 2023 - Bart Mendoza
- 2021 - Elizabeth Abbott & Kent Johnson / The San Diego Troubadour
- 2015 - Louie Procaccino
- 2014 - Candye Kane
