= Museum of Contemporary Art, Tucson =

Art museum

Coordinates: 32.2181°N 110.9718°W

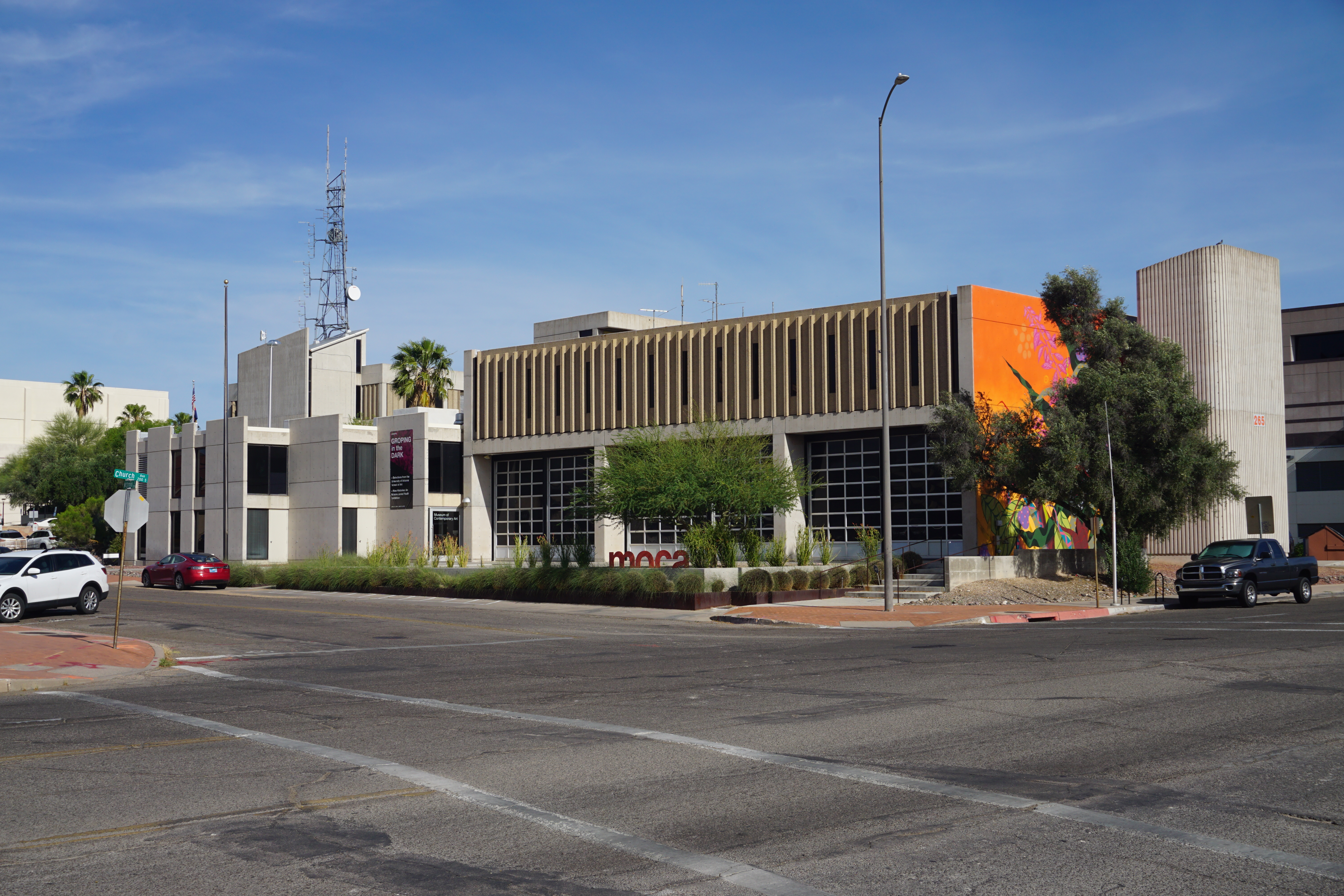
Museum of Contemporary Art, Tucson

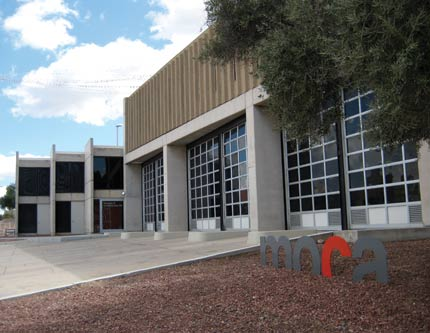
MOCA, Tucson

The Museum of Contemporary Art (MOCA) in Tucson, Arizona, United States, was founded in 1997, by Julia Latané, James Graham, Olivier Mosset, Elizabeth Cherry, and David Wright. The museum was founded to create a permanent institution for contemporary art in Tucson's arts district. Originally housed in the HazMat building on Toole Avenue, the museum relocated to the former fire department building on Church Avenue in 2010.

== History ==
=== Toole Building ===
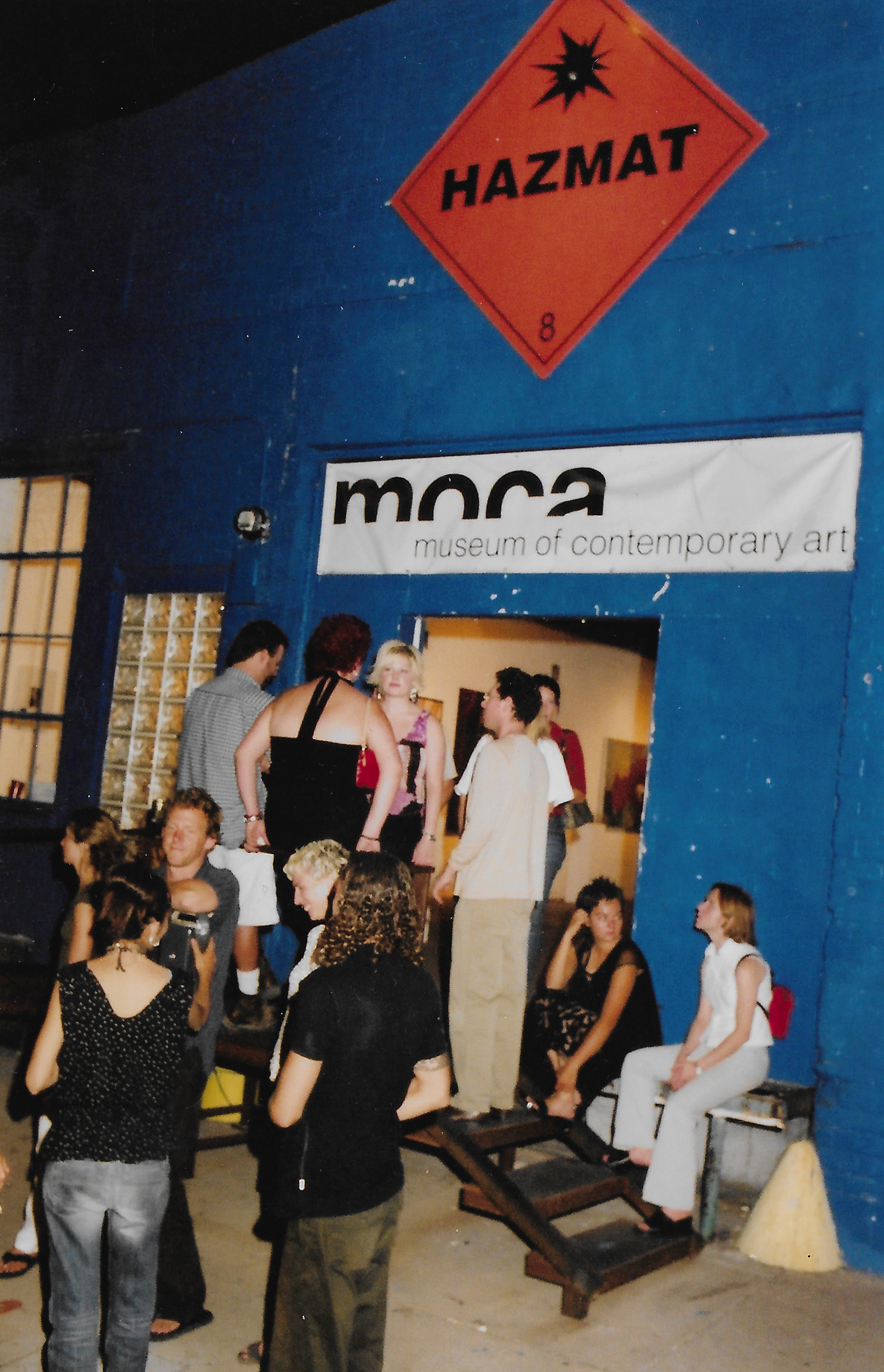
Before moving to the fire station, the exhibition space was located in the HazMat building on Toole Avenue.

In 1992, James Graham, Julia Latané and Dave Lewis founded the Toole Shed Studios under the auspices of the Tucson Arts Coalition (TAC). MOCA was incorporated in the spring of 1997. It was conceived as the next step in the continued growth and development of the Toole Shed Artists’ Studios and as an important addition to the downtown Arts District. In order to better serve the interests of the tenants and the community, and responding to the wealth of local contemporary art activity, the artists of Toole Shed Studios decided to incorporate as an independent cooperative. The articles of incorporation and bylaws were written in 1997 and 501(c)3 status was received by the end of that year. Graham was the Founding Director of MOCA, and Latané served as President of the board with David Wright (founder of Sixth Congress Gallery) as Secretary and Treasurer.

During the spring of 1998, the foundations for MOCA were laid. In August 1998 the opportunity arose to occupy a warehouse space at 191 East Toole Avenue. Over the course of the next four months, volunteers worked to transform the previously abandoned warehouse into the Museum of Contemporary Art, featuring more than four thousand square feet of exhibition space.

Between 2001 and 2003, local gallery owner Elizabeth Cherry served as interim director and curator. In March 2003, Anne-Marie Russell was appointed to the position of Executive Director and Chief Curator, and in 2017 Ginger Shulick Porcella became the new Executive Director and Chief Curator of MOCA.

=== Fire Station ===
In 2009, Tucson’s Fire Station #1 was decommissioned and the firefighters relocated to a new facility. A request for proposals was issued for the “highest and best use” of the building and MOCA Tucson saw an opportunity to acquire a permanent space while preserving an important piece of Arizona's modernist architectural history. The main hall that once housed fire trucks became the museum's main exhibition space, while the first-floor offices were converted into white-box galleries for showcasing intimate works. The firefighters' quarters were transformed into artist-in-residence accommodations, and the second-floor offices were repurposed into administrative offices and an education space for the museum. Since 2009, MOCA has presented between eight and twelve exhibitions per year, showcasing the works of local, regional, national, and international artists. The museum has also established an Artist-in-Residence Program, developed youth programming for underserved populations, and hosts a variety of public events such as ArtNow!, Artist Talk series, dance, performance, music, and other celebrations of the arts.

== Exhibits ==
Date of Exhibit	Exhibit Name	Artist(s)
March 6 – June 13, 2010	Made in Tucson/Born in Tucson/Live in Tucson Part 1	Artists included in the exhibition: Taylor Baldwin, Don Bell, Robert Breer, Skyler Brickley, Raven Chacon, Robert Colescott, Bailey Doogan, SJ Gibson, Amy Granat, Harmony Hammond, Alex Hay, Drew Heitzler, Adam Helms, Charles Hitner, Brookhart Jonquil, Marguerite Kahrl, Kim Largey, Jessica James Lansdon, Julia Latané, Carolyn Leigh, Dave Lewis, Jason Manley, Mathieu Mercier, Tom Miller, Olivier Mosset, Vik Muniz Coke Wisdom O’Neal, Raymond Pettibon, Lucy Raven, Francois Robert, Dave Sayre, Aili Schmeltz, Ken Shorr, Luke Stettner, Andy Steinbrink, Eric Golo Stone, Julianne Swartz, Janaina Tschäpe, Kade L. Twist, Dick Tuck, Alex Von Bergen, Steven Yazzie, Nathan Young, and Peter Young
July 10 – September 26, 2010	Made in Tucson/Born in Tucson/Live in Tucson Part 2	Artists included in the exhibition: Jack Balas, Matt Cotten, Lawrence Gipe, Dimitri Kozyrev, Kim Largey, Bill Mackey, Chika Matsuda, Armando Miguélez, Dean Narcho, Alfred Quiroz, Lucy Raven, Gwyneth Scally, Kenneth Shorr, Dana Smith, Paco Velez, and Lee Ann Woolery.
October 23, 2010 – May 29, 2011	The Artist As Collector: Olivier Mosset	Artists included in the exhibition: Peter Young, Jeffrey Schad, Vincent Szarek, Virginia Overton, George Belcher, Mathieu Mercier, Serge Bard, Drew Heitzler, Amy Granat, Alexandre Bianchini, Jeff Bursey, Darren Clark, Catherine Eyde, Sylvie Fleury, John Armleder, Cliff Taylor, Emory Douglas, Frederic Sanchez, Hinrich Sachs, Francis Baudevin, Renee Levi, Joan Waltemath, John Nixon, Sarina Basta & Gabrielle Penabaz, S.J. Gibson, Dave Sayre, Chuck Nanney, Nicole Hassler, Steven Parrino, Dimitry Orlac, Emily Sunblad, Haley Mellin, Lawrence Weiner, Jackie McAllister, Mike Bidlo, Fia Backstrom, Robert Colescott, Liam Gillick, Dan Walsh, Isabel Halley & Joana Avillez, Howard Smith, Christian Robert-Tissot, Dan Graham, Sherrie Levine, Louise Lawler, Michael Zahn, Yves Klein.
March 5 – May 29, 2011	The Slanted Broom	Jocko Weyland
	Tomorrowland	Aili Schmeltz
July 9 – October 16, 2011	The Tucson Work	Gerben Mulder
October 22, 2011 - April 1, 2012	The Punk Years 1978-86	Raymond Pettibon
November 1, 2010 – March 25, 2011	Plata o Plomo	Camp Bosworth
Winter 2011
December 17, 2010 – March 25, 2011	Legislate Crazy	Armando Miguelez
Spring 2012
April 21 – November 21, 2012	The Air Show	Participating Artists: Gerban Mulder, Brookhart Jonquil, Mathieu Mercier, Jessica James Lansdon, Olivier Mosset, Janaina Tschäpe, Sarina Basta & Gabrielle Penabaz, Peter Young, Vincent Szarek, Alois Kronschlaeger, Dorothy Iannone, Jocko Weyland, Henry Kerr, Robert Colescott, Coke Wisdom O’Neal, Armando Miguélez
Summer 2012
June 30 – September 16, 2012	Quietly Taking Over the World	Vinjon Global Corp
Winter 2012
December 14, 2011– April 27, 2012	Capitalist Masterpieces	Peter Young
Spring 2013
May 25 – July 7, 2012	Chrysalis	Chico MacMutrie/ Amorphic Robot Works
May 25 – September 22, 2013	Action Through Redaction	Kenneth Shorr
July 26 – August 18, 2013	The Early Years	Wylywn Dominic Reyes
July 13 – September 8, 2013	The Box	Coke Wisdom O'Neal
Fall 2013
October 4, 2013 – March 16, 2014	Untitled (Basin and Range)	Alois Kronschlaeger
October 4, 2013 - January 26, 2014	How to Kill a Marvin Gaye Song	David Sayre
Spring 2014
February 15 – May 18, 2014	Floating Worlds	Janaina Tschape
Summer 2014
June 21-September 14, 2014	Blueprint	Guest Curator: Sebastiaan Bremer and Florian Idenburg & Jing Liu
	MOCA Bas-Relief (Mike-Papa-Bravo)	Sebastiaan Bremer
	BAKERMAN	I.U.D. (Lizzi Bougatsos, Sadie Laska, and Spencer Sweeny)
Fall 2014
September 27 – December 7, 2014	Mouton	Francois-Zavier LaLanne
	On Kindness	Jacob Kassay & Kyle Thurman
	Golden State	Guest curator: Drew Heitzler Artists included in the exhibition: Samara Golden, Lucy Dodd, Kaari Upson, Lucy Raven, Amy Yao, Pentii Monkkonen, Liz Craft, Mungo Thomson, Scott Benzel, Theodora Allen
Spring 2015
January 11 - May 31, 2015	Robert Barber: A Retrospective	Robert Barber
Summer 2015
June 20 - September 26, 2015	Mobile Pools	
	6 Artists	Artists included in the exhibition: Eli Burke, Bryan Crow, Ishi Glinsky, Jessica James Lansdon, Andrew Shuta, Jason Write
Fall 2015
October 24, 2015 - January 31, 2016	Next Time	Alex Von Bergen
	Best Dressed Pirate	Alex Streeter
Spring 2016
February 13 - May 29, 2016	For All: Selections from the Arts for All Archive	
	Every Word Said: History Lessens from Athens and Tucson	Nicole Miller
	1991-2016	Max Estenger
Summer 2016
June 18 -September 25, 2016	Tucson 3 Ways: A Foray into Digital Alchemy	MachineHistories
	Gardens of the Pure	Kitty Brophy, Emma Kohlmann, Alice Mackler
	Christofer Churchill	Christofer Churchill
	Steven Parrino	Steven Parrino
Fall 2016
October 29 - January 29, 2017	Meeting the Clouds Halfway	Aranda\Lasch and Terrol Dew Johnson
	Sleep Never Rusts	JPW3
	Sound and Noise	Miranda Lichtenstein
Spring 2017
February 18 - May 28, 2017	If You Stay Busy You Have No Time to Be Unhappy	
	How to Make and Mend Cast Nets	Andy Steinbrink
	From Antelope Springs	Dennis Jeffy
	The Joy of Multitasking	John Kilduff
Summer 2017
June 17 - October 1, 2017	A night on the edge of forever: The art of midnight films, free theater, and the psychedelic Underground San Francisco 1969-1973	Guest Curator: Steve Terry Various artists included in the exhibition
	Why?! Why Did You Take My Log?!?!	Virginia Overton
	Selected Ambient Works, Volume II	Chuck Nanney
	Tucson Nights: After dark in the Naked Pueblo	Tucson John
Fall 2017
October 7 - December 31, 2017	Nothing to Declare	Artists included in the exhibition: Lana Z. Caplan, Saulo Cisneros, Wesley Fawcett Creigh, Miguel Frenandez de Castro, Einar & Jamex de la Torre, Blane de St. Croix, Francisco Eme, Louis Hock, Khaled Jarrar, Kaydee Jimenez, PANCA, Omar Pimienta, Marcos Ramirez
	Estamos Buscando	Paul Turounet
	BYNOWWEARETHERE	Artists included in the exhibition: Isan Brant, Stephanie Burchett, Conor Elliot Fitzgerald, Wren Gardiner, Hellen Gaudence, Jonathan Marquis, Nassem Navab, Karoliina Paatos, Dustin Shores, Galen Trezise, David Taylor
Winter 2017
January 13, 2017 - March 25, 2018	Westification	Rosson Crow
	In Residence	Rose Eken
	Out of the Pale	Victoria Fu
	Town and Country	Robert Melee
	Carl Jung's Assault Rifles The Game	Bryan Zanisnik
Spring 2018
April 7 - June 30, 2018	Last Nation	Folkert de Jong
Spring 2024
February 2 – June 23, 2024	Sofía Córdova: Sin Agua	Sofía Córdova
February 2 – June 23, 2024	Sara Hubbs and Sarah Zapata: Between Gravity and Ground	Sara Hubbs, Sarah Zapata
March 8 - September 22, 2024	Fay Ray: Portals	Fay Ray
Fall 2024
September 13, 2024 - February 16, 2025	Karima Walker: Graves for the Rain	Karima Walker
September 13, 2024 – February 16, 2025	CAConrad: 500 Places at Once	CAConrad
October 11, 2024 - February 9, 2025	Juan Obando and Yoshua Okón: Demo	Juan Obando, Yoshua Okón

=== Fundraisers ===
MOCA Tucson has two large fundraisers a year: an annual Gala and a Fall Fundraiser. Every two years, the gala features the Local Genius Awards, honoring visionary and innovative Tucsonans whose activities have a global impact and whose talents have been internationally recognized.

LGA Award Recipients
Year	Award Recipient
2018	Carol A. Barnes
	Thomas Grogan
	Susan Stryker
2016	Ofelia Zepeda
	Mort Rosenblum
	Andrew Weil, M.D.
	Brad Lancaster
2013	Rick Joy
	Dr. Gary Nabham
	Dr. Anna Dornhaus
	Robert A. Williams
	Peter Warshall, Ph.D.
2011	Joey Burnes (of Calexico)
	John Convertino (of) Calexico)
	Jacob Valenzuela (of Calexico)
	Dr. Diana Liverman
	Jane Poynter
	Taber MacCallum
	Leslie Marmon Silko
	Janos Wilder
2009	Peter Smith
	Byrd Baylor
	Sherwin Bitsui
	Suzana Davila
	Robert Colescott
	Howe Gelb

== Residency programs ==
=== Artist-in-Residence Program ===
MOCA Tucson has a competitive artist residency program that was relaunched through a public application process in 2017, receiving several hundred applications for just seven annual slots lasting between two weeks and three months. Selected artists receive private studio and housing space, studio visits with curators, production stipends and PR support, as well as an opportunity to present a public program, exhibition, or lecture at the museum.

2017/2018 Artists-in-Residence
Date	Artist(s)
October 8–28, 2017	Bryan Zanisnik
November 11–23, 2017	Gelare Khoshgozaran
October 8, 2017 - January 13, 2017	Robert Melee
January 15 - March 31, 2018	Kris Grey
	Scotty Wagner and Bailey Hikawa
May 1–22, 2018	Rachel Frank
October 1 - December 31, 2018	Tra Bouscaren

=== Curator-in-Residence Program ===
MOCA recently launched a Curator-in Residence Program starting in 2019 with the first Curator-in-Residence, Alex Young. Selected museum professionals will be given a three-month residency and MOCA will provide time, space, and access to resources for a curator to develop an exhibition, conduct research, and engage with MOCA Tucson’s artists-in-residence.
