= Yumi Janairo Roth =

American visual artist

- Born: Eugene, Oregon
- Education: MFA, SUNY New Paltz; BFA, School of the Museum of Fine Arts, Boston; BA, Tufts University
- Website: www.yumijroth.com

Yumi Janairo Roth is a Colorado-based visual artist who is known for her sculptures and site-responsive projects that explore themes of hybridity, immigration, and displacement. Working in diverse media, Roth's practice elevates the mundane, honors international craft techniques, and empowers the interloper to navigate unfamiliar places. Roth is an associate professor of Sculpture and Post-Studio Practice at the University of Colorado Boulder.

Roth was born in Eugene, OR and raised in Chicago and Washington D.C. She earned a BFA in Visual Arts from the School of the Museum of Fine Arts, Boston in 1993; a BA in Anthropology from Tufts University in 1993; and an MFA in Metals from SUNY New Paltz in 1998.

== Projects ==
Stacked Datsun (2013) is a project that draws on themes from the American West (the 1960s Datsun pickup bed), international shipping industry (wooden pallets), and handicraft traditions (mother of pearl inlay). In combining these references through appropriated objects and ornate patterns meticulously inlayed into the pallets, Roth disrupts the traditional function of the materials and calls into question the value of labor, the romantic quest for progress, and the disassociation between commercial goods and their place of origin.

10,000dwt (pennyweights) (2011) is a chainlink fence that the artist made by hand with sterling silver. The work mimics the commonplace galvanized chainlink fences that are mass-produced and used as a barrier on both private and public property. Roth recontextualizes the uninviting form by producing her version with a precious metal, typically used in jewelry and flatware production.

Prodded, Tugged, Pushed, Pulled and Paleta::Pallet (2007) are two of Roth's projects that she developed through research and residencies in the Philippines. Appropriating forms commonly used to ship goods or mobilize commercial products, Roth recontextualizes shipping pallets and furniture dollies by incorporating traditional Filipino handicraft into their construction. Prodded, Tugged, Pushed, Pulled is a series of objects made of mahogany and rattan that imitate the everyday furniture dolly. Paleta::Pallet is a series of wooden pallets that have been intricately handcarved with a traditional Filipino motif. These projects draw attention to the universal devices that transport goods around the world without retaining a sense of origin.

Detoured (2003–2005) is a series of sculptures that explore themes of authority and glamour and how transposing these associations through object and material can bring up questions regarding boundaries and regulations, and whose job it is to enforce them. Roth has covered the surface of police barriers in small mirrors resembling a disco ball, she created traffic cones using pinata construction techniques and filled the insides with candy, and produced satin slipcovers for concrete road barricades.

== Exhibitions ==
=== 2016 ===
Yumi Janairo Roth, Sienna Patti Contemporary, Pulse Art Fair, NYC

=== 2015 ===
ArtSourced Call Center, Smack Mellon, Brooklyn, NY

=== 2013 ===
Modifications and Adaptations, Galleries 1 & 2, TSU, San Marcos, TX

=== 2012 ===
All That Glitters, The Front, New Orleans, LA

Continental Drift, Museum of Contemporary Art Denver and Aspen Art Museum, CO

=== 2011 ===
Kaugummiautomatenpreise, Public Project, Frankfurter Kunstverein, Germany

Site 92, Smack Mellon, NYC

Perfect Citizen, Arts Council, Princeton, NJ

=== 2010 ===
F.O.B.: Yumi Janairo Roth, Cuchifritos Project Space and Gallery, NYC

Painting and Sculpture, Lehmann Maupin, NYC

You Are Here, Pratt Manhattan Gallery, NYC

This is not a Photograph, Blue Star Contemporary, Unit B, San Antonio, TX

=== 2009 ===
Hand Drawn Map Association, Florida International University, Miami, FL

Beauty Underfoot, Smack Mellon, NYC

Untitled, Casa Orlandai, Barcelona, Spain

All Over the Map, Kohler Art Center, Sheboygan, WI

Infinite Possibilities, Momenta Art, Brooklyn, NY

=== 2008 ===
In Transition, Boulder Museum of Contemporary Art, Boulder, CO

Ruminant, Institute of Contemporary Art, Portland, ME

Surprisingly Natural, Bronx River Arts Center, NYC

Political Craft, Society of Arts and Crafts, Boston, MA

Flower Power, Museum of Fine Arts, Santa Fe, NM

=== 2007 ===
Yumi Janairo Roth, Apama Mackey Gallery, Houston, TX

Prodded, Tugged, Pushed, Pulled, Ayala Museum, Manila, Philippines

ArtCamp, Galerie Petrohrad, Pilsen, Czech Republic

=== 2006 ===
Speak Clearly So We Can Understand, Sarah Bowen Gallery, Brooklyn, NY

Run for Your Lives, DiverseWorks, Houston, TX

Prevailing Climate, Sara Meltzer Gallery, NYC

2005

Detoured, Lawndale Art Center, Houston, TX

Small Acts of Public Service, Vargas Museum, Manila, Philippines

Roth explores ideas of immigration, hybridity, and displacement through the reinvention of banal objects, site-responsive installations, and projects that recontextualize the familiar.
