= Gerben Mulder =

Dutch artist

Gerben Mulder (born April 25, 1972) is a Dutch artist who lives in New York City and Rio de Janeiro. Mulder moved from the Netherlands to the United States in 1993.

== Biography ==
During the course of his career as a fine artist, he has participated in exhibitions at many art venues worldwide. In the United States, his artwork has been exhibited at the Newman Popiashvili Gallery and Suite 106 Gallery, New York, New York; the Museum of Contemporary Art in Tucson, Arizona; and the Roos Arts Gallery in Rosendale, New York. In Europe, his artwork has been exhibited at the Kunst Verein Koelnberg, Galerie K4 and the Galerie Michael Janssen in Germany, Pippy Houldsworth, London, UK, Galerie Anton Weller, Paris, France, the Galeria Fortes Vilaça in Brazil, and the Galerie Akinci and Frank Taal Galerie in the Netherlands.

== Selected exhibitions ==
- 2023 July – September, Summer Group Show, MPV Gallery, Oisterwijk, Netherlands
- 2023 May – June, Gerben Mulder: Moon Madness, Marisa Newman Projects, New York, USA
- 2023 January – March, CA$H '23, Galerie Frank Taal, Rotterdam, Netherlands
- 2022 July – August, Bart Julius Peters & Gerben Mulder: A Perspective on Colour, Josilda Da Conceição Gallery, Amsterdam, Netherlands
- 2022 May – June, Gerben Mulder: Life Goes On, Galerie Frank Taal, Rotterdam, Netherlands
- 2022 March – May, Here We Are: Exhibition #5, MPV Gallery, Oisterwijk, Netherlands
- 2022 January – March, Catch '22, Galerie Frank Taal, Rotterdam, Netherlands
- 2021 July – August, Art Rotterdam 2021, Galerie Frank Taal, Rotterdam, Netherlands
- 2020 September – November, The Beginning, MPV Gallery, Oisterwijk, Netherlands
- 2020 July – August, (Un)certainty: A reconsideration of our beliefs through art, Galerie Frank Taal, Rotterdam, Netherlands
- 2019 February – March, Paper Chase, Marisa Newman Projects, New York, USA
- 2018 August, Summer Show, Galerie Frank Taal, Rotterdam, Netherlands
- 2018 January – February, Stephen Shanabrook & Gerben Mulder: Poor Traits, Galerie Frank Taal, Rotterdam, Netherlands
- 2017 September – November, Gerben Mulder at Fortes D'Aloia & Gabriel, SÃO PAULO (GALPÃO) Brazil
- 2015 January – March, BLUE PRINT at Storefront for art and architecture NY NY USA, accompanied with catalogue, curated by Sebastiaan Bremer & SO – IL (Solid Objectives, Florian Idenburg en Jing Liu)
- 2014 October, POP UP, Gerben Mulder & Arthur Mulder at Fournier Street. London UK
- 2014 Gerben Mulder – Frank Taal Galerie Rotterdam, Still–Life
- 2014 21 June – 20 September, BLUEPRINT, MOCA TUCSON, Tucson Arizona, USA, Curated by Sebastiaan Bremer & SO – IL (Solid Objectives, Florian Idenburg en Jing Liu).
- 2014 June – September, Figure That, Frank Taal Galerie, Rotterdam, NL.
- 2014 16 February – 23 March, BLUEPRINT – BLAUWDRUK, KUNSTHAL DE KADE, Amersfoort Netherlands, Curated by Sebastiaan Bremer SO – IL (Solid Objectives, Florian Idenburg en Jing Liu)
- 2013 September, Frank Taal Galerie, Rundgang Spinnerei, Leipzig Germany
- 2013 Almanac, Newman Popiashvili gallery, NY USA
- 2012 Dirty messy painting, Roosarts, Rosendale, NY USA, Curated by Heige Kim & Gerben Mulder
- 2012 Flowers for you, Stephan Stoyanov gallery, NY USA
- 2012 AIR, Museum of contemporary art Tucson, AZ USA
- 2012 Gerben Mulder – Galeria Fortes Vilaca, New paintings
- 2011 Gerben Mulder – Museum of contemporary art Tucson, The Tucson work
- 2010 Gerben Mulder – Newman Popiashvili Gallery, NY, USA
- 2010 Boston University gallery (Sherman Gallery), fresh Flowers
- 2010 kunst verein koln Germany drawing now –aktuel- gerben Mulder, Jan Fabre, Enrique Martin, Paul Morrison
- 2010 the bug the spider and the butterfly, Roos arts NY USA, Janaina Tschäpe, Xavier Noiret-Thomé, Gerben Mulder
- 2009 Gerben Mulder – Gallery Akinci, Amsterdam, Netherlands
- 2009 Naked – Galeria Fortes Vilaça, São Paulo, Brasil
- 2009 Gerben Mulder – Gallery de Schouw – Rotterdam, Netherlands
- 2009 "I don't fucking simply know what to do" Gallery Anton Weller – Isabelle Suret, Paris France
- 2009 Casa do Saber, Rio de Janeiro, Brazil
- 2008 Gerben Mulder, New paintings – Galeria Fortes Vilaça, São Paulo, Brazil.
- 2008 Curatorial Project Arco Madrid – Newman Popiashvili Gallery, NY
- 2008 International Drawing Fair Paris – Gallery Anton Weller – Isabelle Suret, Paris France
- 2007 "The Sickbed" – Galerie k4 München – with catalogue (Germany)
- 2007 Works on /of paper – Gallery K4, Munich, Germany
- 2007 EXPOSIÇÃO MUNDO ANIMAL, curated by Marcia Fortes, São Paulo, Brazil
- 2006 "The Aftermath" – Newman Popiashvili Gallery, New York
- 2006 "Online: Contemporary Drawing" – The University Art Gallery at Sonoma State university
- 2005 "Things I'd like to say but don't know how" – Galeria Fortes Vilaça, São Paulo, Brazil
- 2005 Gerben Mulder – Galerie k4, München (Germany)
- 2005 Newman Popiashvili gallery NY, 112 Mercerstreet
- 2005 "Lost Treasures" – Galerie Michael Janssen Köln, (Germany)
- 2005 "10" – Michael Janssen Gallery, Cologne, Germany
- 2004 Gallery Akinci, Amsterdam (Group show)
- 2004 Bazar de Verão, Galeria Fortes Vilaça, São Paulo, Brasil
- 2003 Akinci Gallery, Amsterdam, Netherlands (group)
- 2003 SUITE 106 Gallery, New York City
- 2003 Satellite Roebling Hall. New York City
- 2003 Gallery Akinci, Amsterdam, Netherlands
- 2002 "My Father Told Me...", SUITE 106 Gallery, New York City
- 2002 Bodybuilder & Sportsman Gallery, Chicago, USA
- 2000 "Sexy", Houldsworth Gallery, London, England
- 1999 "Egyptian Radio",1st Liverpool Bienale, UK
- 1998 "Blueprint", Spark Gallery, New York City
