= Momenta Art =

Artist-run, non-profit art space

Momenta Art was an artist-run, not-for-profit organization and gallery, which from its founding in 1986 to its closing in 2016, exhibited and promoted emerging artists and underrepresented artistic perspectives. Artists who received support from Momenta Art include Simone Leigh, Chitra Ganesh, Elana Herzog, and Mark Tribe.

== Origins ==
=== Philadelphia ===
Momenta Art was founded in 1986 by a group of five artists in Philadelphia, Timothy Aubry, Donna Czapiga, Eric Heist, Christina LaSala, and James Mills. Their first exhibition, “The Cast Iron Building Presents Momenta Art”, was an inclusive group exhibition of 47 emerging artists working in Philadelphia exhibited in a raw industrial space on Arch Street in the Old City section of Philadelphia loaned to the group by a real estate development company, Growth Properties. The organizers were criticized by established arts organization Philadelphia Art Alliance for exchanging artworks from the exhibition to be included in Growth Properties’ art collection. The popularity of the exhibition encouraged the founders to rent a five-story building, 309 N. 3rd Street, also in Old City, which they pooled their money together to rent, renovate the ground floor into a gallery, and sublet the upper floors as studio space.

Momenta Art operated at this space from 1986 to 1990, exhibiting the work of emerging artists. These included now-established artists Jim Hodges, Katy Schimert, and Karen Kilimnik. Momenta established itself as a non-profit organization at this time, and received some funding from the Pennsylvania Council on the Arts and discretionary funding from Senator Vincent Fumo. However, the financial burden and time required to administer the organization led to the dissolution of Momenta in 1990.

== History ==
=== SoHo, New York City ===
Momenta cofounder, Eric Heist, relocated to New York City, where he attended Hunter College graduate school. He met video artist Laura Parnes and together they began to organize exhibitions in New York City.

=== Chelsea ===
In 1992, the gallery community was moved from SoHo to Chelsea, leaving many large loft spaces empty in the downtown district, and available for temporary rentals. Artist Kenny Schachter was already organizing temporary exhibitions in SoHo at that time, inspiring Heist and Parnes, who found a 5,000-square-foot second floor space available in the area for $2,000. In order to raise funds for an exhibition they created hand-screened manila envelopes containing multiple artworks by artists John Hatfield, Lucky De Bellevue, John Groh (Jed Brain), Marlene McCarty, Janine Antoni, Sue Williams, Jude Tallichet, Chuck Agro, David Carrino, Jody Culkin, Tony Feher, Paula Hayes, Janet Henry, Jim Hodges, Barry Hylton, Pat Lasch, Julie Melton, Serge Pinkus, Barbara Pollack, Lily Van Der Stokker, Heist, and Parnes. They went door-to-door selling these multiple packets to SoHo galleries, including gallerists David Zwirner, Sandra Gering, and others, for $30 each. This secured the funding to pay for the space and the exhibition “The Art of Self-Defense and Revenge... It’s Really Hard,” which presented the artists included in the multiples collection. The exhibition inverted stereotypes of power and passivity by separating the work of male and female artists.

The exhibition was visited by critics Michael Kimmelman and Jerry Saltz who wrote an encouraging review of the exhibition for Art in America magazine. Heist and Parnes followed up in 1994 with an exhibition space rented alongside Bravin Lee Gallery on Mercer Street. Titled “Yes I Am, No I’m Not”, the exhibition included Matthew Benedict, Robert Blanchon, Mary Beth Edelson, Kara Hammond, Janet Henry, Trudie Reiss, Kenny Schachter, Kerri Scharlin, Danny Tisdale, Miguel Ventura, Karen Yamauchi, and Naief Yehya, and focused on created identities.

=== Brooklyn ===
In March 1995, Momenta Art opened in a permanent exhibition space in the Williamsburg section of Brooklyn, signing a 10-year lease for a 4,000-square-foot space at 72 Berry Street close to other emerging galleries. The space consisted of two exhibition spaces, as well as artist studios that were offered at below-market rates. Artists who joined the community over the following decade included Rico Gatson, Rochelle Feinstein, Rina Banerjee, Carl Fudge, Matthew Abbott, Wangechi Mutu, and Adam Henry.

During this time, Momenta Art established itself as one of the hub galleries of the Williamsburg art scene, finding success in collaborations with Manhattan galleries, including Ronald Feldman, as well as with the Brooklyn Museum. To complement their exhibitions, the gallery published a paper newsletter that detailed exhibiting artists and their creations as well as an annual catalog showcasing all the noteworthy gallery exhibitions. Additionally, the newsletter featured a helpful map highlighting nearby art spaces and provided supportive information for those who were unfamiliar with the Williamsburg arts community.

Working as co-directors, Parnes and Heist became known for their group exhibition fundraisers at White Columns and other venues in which donated works by artists of note were raffled off to ticket holders. Michael Waugh joined the team managing Momenta Art in 2000 and under his guidance a publicly accessible video library was established. When Parnes stepped down as co-director in 2004 to focus on her own work, Waugh took on the role of assistant director and Parnes became the chair of the board.

Other artists whose work was exhibited at this location include Huma Bhabha, Derrick Adams, Wangechi Mutu, Akiko Ichikawa, Simone Leigh, Yasser Aggour, and Roe Ethridge. A group exhibition regarding created identities organized by artist Deb Kass titled “Enough About Me” included work by Adrian Piper, Cindy Sherman, Michael Smith, John Kelly, Delia Brown, Guy Richards Smit, John Waters, Hiroshi Sunairi, and Nikki S. Lee. “Pop Patriotism”, curated by artist Peter Scott, satirized the commercial exploitation of 9/11 and included work by Heidi Schlatter, Christy Rupp, Thomas Sherrod, and David Opdyke. “No Return”, organized by Eric Heist, examined circular systems of economy and waste linking art and commerce included works by Jed Ela, Lan Tuazon, Peggy Diggs, Rainer Ganahl, and Pawel Wojtasik. "Still Ill", organized by John Lovett and Alessandro Codagnone, presented a series of performances that included Rita Ackermann, Jonathan Schipper, Adrien Cowen, and Agathe Snow.

==== Bedford Avenue ====
In 2006, Momenta Art relocated to a larger space at 359 Bedford Avenue. During this period, Momenta Art garnered considerable art world attention for the shows such as Air Kissing (2007), addressed alienation and inequalities in the art world, and Project Rendition (2007), which examined the Bush administrations clandestine kidnapping and extradition of suspected terrorists. Momenta Art's time at 359 Bedford was relatively short-lived, however, as a changing demographic and real estate market in Williamsburg encouraged Heist and Waugh to move again, this time to Bushwick, Brooklyn, and a location that offered more space (over 4,000 square feet) and facilities for artists and exhibits than what was negotiable in Williamburg.

==== Bogart Street ====
The first show for Momenta Art's Bushwick location at 56 Bogart Street, an exhibit of the photography of J. Pasila and Peter Scott, took place in the raw, partially-renovated space newly opened gallery. In a curatorial decision that reflected on the provisional nature of their current circumstances and the cyclical nature of neighborhood development, Momenta "simply stuck push pins directly through the print and attached them, frameless, on the wall." With funding from the National Endowment for the Arts (NEA), and the New York State Council on the Arts (NYSCA) plans for the new space included an expansion of the video library project, which housed hundreds of artworks from dozens of artists, and making them permanently available to the public on a searchable database on a touch-screen monitor at the gallery. Plans also included events hosted in the library, including panel discussions with past video artists, and an ongoing curated selection of video work on view in the gallery.

With 2,700 feet of dedicated gallery and library space, the rest of the complex would be divided in art studios, storage, and eventually provide facilities for residencies Momenta's exhibitions during this period often critiqued the machinations of the art world and art markets and continued to focus on artists from underrepresented communities. Bolivia Existe (2013–14) accommodated cross-generational Bolivian artists, whose works respond to Bolivia's painful history of military dictatorship and neoliberalization. The exhibition of Occupy Museums (2012) raised a series of questions regarding the political economy within which art institutions are embedded. Jacqueline Hoang Nguyen's solo exhibition Space Fiction & the Archives (2014) critiqued what she perceived to be disguised racism and planned economic exploitation that lurk under multiculturalism.

=== Closing ===
With a reduced funding base during the 2008 financial crisis, Momenta Art slowly became financially unsustainable. A final, 30-year survey exhibition was organized and Momenta concluded programming with the exhibition "Recap: Thirty Years of Momenta Art", on October 30, 2016.
