= Jonathan Podwil =

American painter

Jonathan Podwil (born 1966) is an American painter and experimental filmmaker living and working in Brooklyn, New York. He is known for paintings based on film and photography and often have oblique references to historical events. In addition he has made short super8 films which are digitally manipulated and presented as looped animations.

Podwil earned his B.A. from the University of Pennsylvania and later studied at the Pennsylvania Academy of the Fine Arts, in Philadelphia, Pennsylvania and the Malmö Konstskola Forum in Sweden. His exhibitions have been reviewed in Artforum, The New Yorker, the New York Sun, and the Austrian Publications Wiener Zeitung, artmagazine.cc and Eikon. Podwil has exhibited at galleries and nonprofit art spaces such as White Columns and Smack Mellon, Postmasters, and Plane Space in New York City, Kunstlerhaus Bethanien in Berlin and IG Bildende Kunst T19, >RAUMSTATION puuul in Vienna, and Södertälje Konsthall in Sweden

He is a recipient two Pollock-Krasnser Foundation fellowships, in 2012 and 2025.
