= Nancy Atakan =

Turkish artist

- Born: 1946 (age 79–80); Virginia, US
- Occupation: Visual artist

Nancy Atakan (born 1946) is a Turkish visual artist. Her works deal with issues of feminism, gender, identity, migration, and memory. Also an art critic and art historian, she has completed her PhD and has authored two books on conceptual art in Turkey. She is a co-founder of the artist-run-space 5533, operating since 2008 in Istanbul Traders' Market Shopping Center.

== Early life and education ==
Atakan was born in Virginia, United States, and completed her undergraduate education in Studio Art and Art History in 1968 at the University of Mary Washington. She moved to Istanbul in 1969 and completed her PhD titled "Conceptual Art in Turkey" under the supervision of Zeynep Inankur at Mimar Sinan University in 1994. She taught Art History at Robert College (1983–1997) and History of European Painting and Sculpture at Boğaziçi University (1996–2000). In 2007 she participated at a residency at the Banff Centre in Alberta, Canada and in 2017 to the Nordic Art Association's (NFK) Residency program with the support of IASPIS.

== Work ==
Having studied painting, Atakan produces drawings, paintings, videos, installations, photography and needlework, using personal archival materials and exploring the relationship between text and image.

Starting from the 1990s, Atakan emphasized the importance of collaboration in her work and defined her approach as "art as dialogue". In the late 1990s she produced independent exhibitions in collaboration with Gülçin Aksoy, Gül Ilgaz, and Neriman Polat, the first of which, titled "Arada" ("In Between") took place in 1997 at Atatürk Cultural Center in Istanbul. Starting from 2000 she also collaborated with the artists from Hafriyat collective in producing several exhibitions in Istanbul: "Local Produce", 2000, Elhamra Passage; "Voices From Homeland", 2001, Karsi Sanat and "Families Only", 2003, Karsi Sanat.

In 2008 when she co-founded the artist-run-space 5533 with Volkan Aslan, she considered this to be a continuation of her practice in the form of "art as dialogue". In the framework of 5533 Nancy Atakan and Volkan Aslan have shaped a programming with the participation of artists and curators such as Adnan Yıldız, Ahmet Öğüt, Anna Eriksson, Asena Günal, Banu Cennetoğlu, CANAN, Cevdet Erek, Can Altay, Fulya Erdemci, Hale Tenger, Ipek Duben, Inci Eviner, Mari Spirito, Marcus Graf, Övül Durmuşoğlu and Pelin Tan. 5533 was the subject of an archival exhibition held at New York's ISCP (International Studio and Curatorial Program) in 2018 featuring documentation, new works and a series of talks.

In 2016, the first monograph focusing on Atakan's works, titled Passing On was published by Kehrer Verlag. Edited by Nat Muller, the publication included contributions by Yeşim Turanlı, Nat Müller, Wendy Shaw and Merve Ünsal. The book focuses on Atakan's latest works dealing with female lineage and intergenerational transmission, with a focus on how women's public and private roles were shaped and transformed during the transition from Ottoman Empire to Turkish Republic, and how this transformation affected intimacy.

== Exhibitions ==
Atakan's works have been presented in exhibitions in the following institutions: Weserburg, Elgiz Museum, Istanbul Modern, Akademie der Kunste, DEPO Istanbul, Apartment Project, Middle East Technical University, CerModern, Kunstverein Langenhagen, Museum of Contemporary Art Copenhagen and Banff Center among others.
