= Alfred Quiroz =

American Artist

- Born: May 9, 1944; Tucson, Arizona
- Occupation: Visual artist

Alfred J.Quiroz (born May 9, 1944, in Tucson, Arizona) is an American artist known for his works that critique historical, social, and political themes that examine injustice. His upbringing in a culturally rich environment informs his exploration of identity, justice, and power dynamics in American society. Employing vibrant colors, caricature-like imagery, and meticulous historical research, Quiroz's art highlights overlooked or controversial aspects of history. A professor emeritus at the University of Arizona, Quiroz has exhibited internationally, contributing significantly to contemporary and Chicano art movements.

== Early life and education ==
Alfred J. Quiroz was born in Tucson, Arizona, on May 9, 1944 and grew up in the Millville barrio. He attended Menlo Park and Borton Elementary, Safford Jr. High, and Tucson High School. He regularly decorated the halls of Tucson High School with themes relating to academics, athletics, dances, socials, and cultural festivities.

As a Navy Vietnam Veteran, he utilized the G.I. Bill to earn a Bachelor of Fine Arts in 1971 at the San Francisco Art Institute, and a Master of Arts in Teaching at Rhode Island School of Design in Providence in 1974. He completed his Master of Fine Arts at the University of Arizona in 1984.

According to the artist, an early mentor advised him to paint what was on his mind. “Then that’s all it took,” Quiroz said. "It opened up the floodgates and everything I had in my head came out." His wife Marcia Quiroz notes: "Alfred is an avid history buff; he really loves it and what he tells his students is to read and research, leave no stone unturned when it comes to investigation."

== Career ==
From 1985 to 1989, Quiroz taught art at schools in Tucson and throughout Arizona doing mural projects with children K-12.

In 1989, Quiroz was appointed to the University of Arizona as an assistant professor. Quiroz was promoted to associate professor with tenure in 1993 and became a full professor in 1998. He is the first Mexican American to obtain full professor status in the Art Department. He retired in 2018 and was awarded emeritus status.

In 2003, he had an exhibition "Alfred Quiroz: Razor's Edge: War, Ideology, Ecstasy" at the Museum of Contemporary Art in Tucson. Margaret Regan, the critic for the Tucson Weekly, said it was "Encyclopedically researched and painted in characteristic caricature, with leering cartoonish figures pushed to the edge of nightmare, the work howls against political evil." She also noted that the artist "meticulously researches history for its forgotten outrages, its glossed-over massacres and land seizures, and brings them to artistic light courtesy of crayon-bright colors." Following his service during the Vietnam War, Regan says "Demolishing patriotic myths has been the artist's job description ever since."

"Presidential Series," his exhibition at the University of Arizona Museum of Art in 2016, surveyed American history through portraits of presidents. According to curator Olivia Miller, "the dichotomy of dazzling colors and the energetic compositions coupled with scenes of debauchery, war, and hypocrisy is difficult, if not impossible for the viewer to reconcile."

As the artist notes in a statement: "My creative process is based on satire, whether it is about the socio-political world we live in or my own personal history. ... I am also fascinated by the usage of the word 'war', such as the drug wars, border wars and the war on crime, terror, etc. All of this creates remarkable displays of jingoism, which in itself it becomes a satire. I see these events as visual 'cartoons.'”

His work has been shown in the Apex Gallery in New York, and in Slovakia, Mexico, Spain, and China. His work is also part of the collection at the Museum of Contemporary Art, Tucson.

== Selected works ==
2015: Las Dilemas del Barrio Millville - Tucson, AZ 1954 an acrylic painting on panel, measuring 55 inches by 120 inches, completed in 2015. The artwork reflects Quiroz's personal connection to the Millville barrio in Tucson, where he grew up, and explores themes related to his childhood experiences in that neighborhood.

1986: Quiroz collaborated with at-risk students to create seven murals at Tucson's Connie Chambers Housing Project (La Reforma). These murals depicted diverse themes, including natural landscapes and cultural symbols, aiming to foster community engagement.

1993: His 24-feet-long painting Novus Ordo was described by the Tucson Weekly as "a map of the entire world, and crowded into the seething borders of its painted nations are depictions of every murderous injustice imaginable."Reviewed in Art America June 1994

1994: George Washington Inspects The Hemp Crop This acrylic piece on mahogany panel, measuring 90 by 86 inches, enhanced with AstroTurf and plastic plants, portrays George Washington examining his hemp fields, referencing historical accounts of his cultivation of hemp at Mount Vernon for industrial purposes. Quiroz's depiction employs a cartoon-like Americana style, incorporating puns and historical details, such as Washington's dentures made from walrus tusk, to provide a satirical commentary on American history.

1995: Thomas Jefferson Sows The Seeds is an oil on canvas measuring 72 by 48 inches. The artwork portrays Jefferson planting hemp seeds while holding a nude Sally Hemings on his knee, referencing his introduction of hemp as a staple crop and his relationship with Hemings.

1996: Muneefist Destiny is a mixed media piece on mahogany panel, measuring 108 by 156 inches. The painting outlines the historical map of Mexico, critiquing the U.S. annexation of the Southwest and the concept of Manifest Destiny. Quiroz incorporates period-specific slogans to highlight the racial and political ideologies of that era.

2002: Nix-On Hell is an acrylic on panel that portrays Richard Nixon enduring punishment in hell. The artwork critiques Nixon's actions during his presidency, particularly the Watergate scandal, by depicting him standing on a hot plate, with his head featuring multiple faces to symbolize deceit, and his hands on springs to mimic his characteristic wave.

2003: Bushwhacked is an acrylic on panel that critiques the policies of George W. Bush.

2004: Parade of Humanity: Border Milagros Quiroz created large aluminum sculptures, on the Mexican side of the newly installed border wall near Nogales, that represent religious votive offerings.

2005: Back To Normalcy is an acrylic on panel that critiques Warren G. Harding's administration, particularly the scandals and corruption that marred his tenure. The title references Harding's 1920 campaign slogan, "Return to Normalcy," which promised a return to pre-World War I stability but was undermined by subsequent governmental misconduct.

2006: Quiroz provided direction for the Phoenix Mars Lander Science Operations Center mural, a 60’ by 20’ mural on the exterior wall of the Lunar and Planetary Laboratory & Department of Planetary Sciences of the University of Arizona.

2006: Quiroz created work for the traveling exhibition African Presence in Mexico organized by the National Museum of Mexican Art in Chicago.

2010: Quiroz was included in the second part of Museum of Contemporary Art, Tucson's inaugural exhibition Made in Tucson/Born in Tucson/Live in Tucson, featuring works made exclusively by artists who either lived or worked in Tucson.

2011: ‘F’Ulna Ah Wuz Why-T is an acrylic on birch panel that exemplifies his satirical approach to addressing social and racial issues. The artwork's title, phonetically reading as "If only I was white," suggests a commentary on racial identity and societal perceptions.Part of the University of Arizona Museum of Art permanent collection.

2017: His Presidential Series was showcased at the University of Arizona Museum of Art. This collection featured satirical paintings critiquing U.S. presidents, highlighting issues of hypocrisy, corruption, and misconduct.

2019: Quiroz's work was included in the exhibition Face to Face: Self Portraits Before Selfie" at the Museum of Texas Tech University in Lubbock. The show explored various approaches to self-representation, with Quiroz's piece Opportunity Target (2008) among the featured artworks.

2021: He participated in Rethinking Social Justice, a virtual exhibition at Pima Community College's Bernal Gallery in Tucson. The show, which also featured artist Allison Miller, focused on social justice themes, reflecting both artists' backgrounds and their commitment to raising awareness on such issues.

2024: Quiroz's artworks in several mediums, including the 2004 Border Milagros and ‘F’Ulna Ah Wuz Why-T, are featured in the Promega Art Showcase.

== Museum collections ==
Quiroz's work is part of the Museum of Contemporary Art, Tucson, including the painting Columbus Introduces Eurocentric Philosophy to America. Six works, including a sculpture Aztec TV (2004), a drawing El Azteca Practicando para Su futuro de Modelo para Calendarios de Tortillerias (Aztec Practicing for his Future Role as a Model for Tortilleria Calendars) of 1992, and El Primero Mafioso de America (1991), a mixed media work on paper, are in the collection of the Tucson Museum of Art. The painting Opportunity Target (2008) is in the collection of the Texas Tech University Museum in Lubbock.

== Awards and honors ==
- 1986, Arizona Biennial Best of Show
- 1996 Clinton King Purchase Award, Museum of Fine Arts, Santa Fe (now New Mexico Museum of Art)
- 1997, Arizona Biennial Juror’s Recognition
- 2001, Chicano Hispano Student Affairs Teaching Excellence & Exemplary Service to Students Award
- 2003, Arizona Biennial Pat Mutterer Memorial Fund First Place Award
- 2003, Fulbright-García Robles Grant as part of the Fulbright Border Program in Mexico
- 2007, LULAC (League of United Latin American Citizens Latino Artist Lifetime Achievement Award
- 2015 – 2016, University of Arizona College of Fine Arts James Anthony Award for Sustained Excellence in Teaching
- 2016, The University of Arizona Museum of Art published Presidential Series Paintings
