= Terrol Dew Johnson =

Tohono O'odham artist and community leader from Arizona (1973–2024)

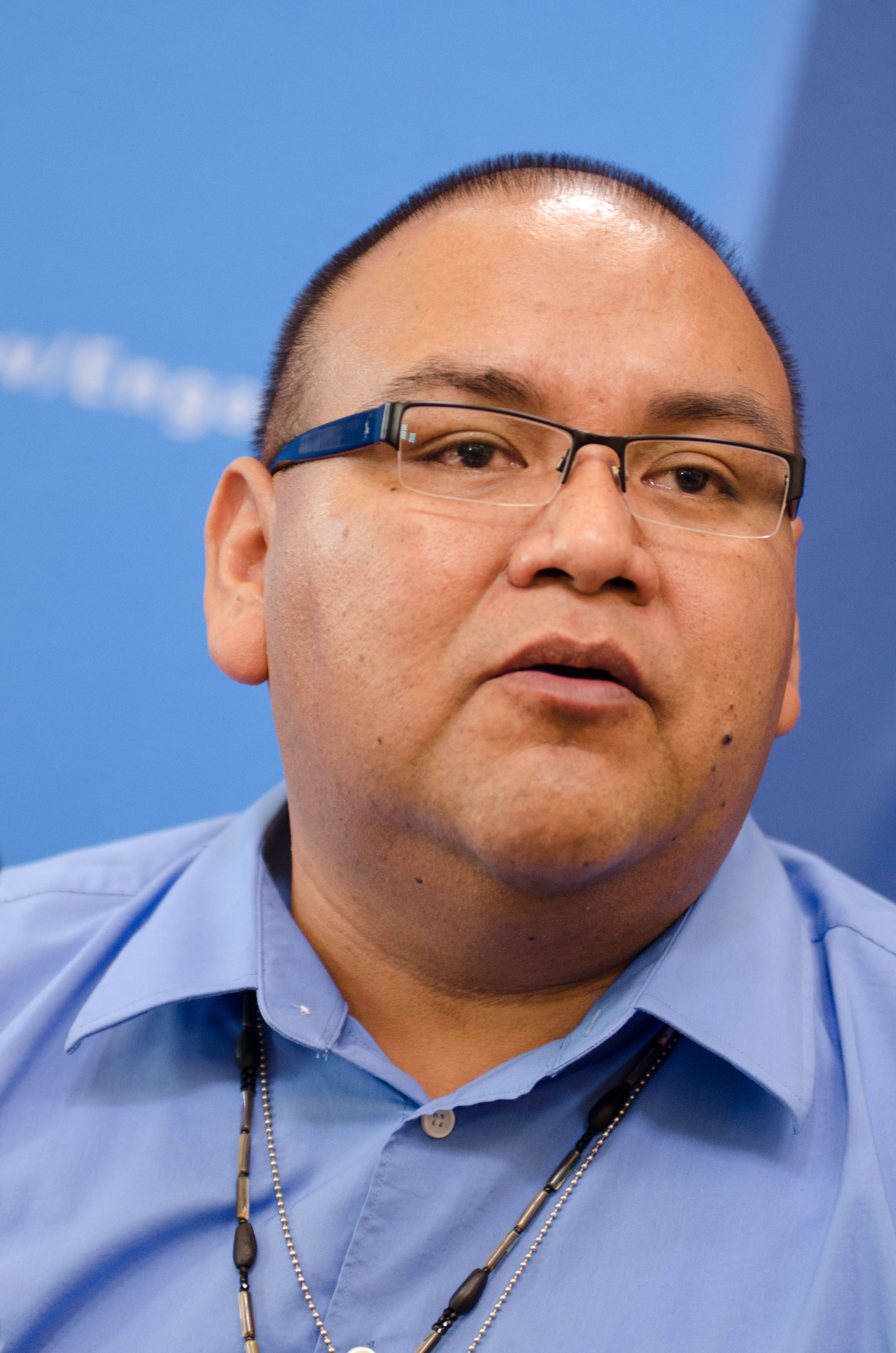
- Terrol Dew Johnson at 2012 Champions of Change gathering at the White House
- Born: 1973; Sells, Arizona, United States
- Died: May 8, 2024 (aged 50–51)
- Citizenship: Tohono O'odham Nation and U.S.
- Education: Self-taught
- Known for: Basket weaving
- Movement: basket making, sculpture
- Website: tdewj.com

Terrol Dew Johnson (1973–2024) was a Tohono O'odham basket maker, sculptor, and health advocate, who promoted Indigenous food sovereignty to promote health and prevent diabetes.

== Background ==
Terrol Dew Johnson was Tohono O'odham from Sells, Arizona. Johnson began weaving at the age of ten. "It was the only thing I was good at," the artist has been quoted as saying, "I've always been touchy-feely and good with my hands—I could do this with my hands, and it was fun!" His parents, particularly his mother Betty Ann Pancho, actively encouraged his interest in basketry.

== Basketry ==
Johnson used plant materials historically used by his tribe in his work in experimental weaves, forms, and techniques. One of his pieces, Quilt Basket, is a virtuoso display of different weaving techniques, suspended from a single branch. His materials include bear grass, yucca, devil's claw, and gourds. He was most known for his gourd baskets, in which pieces of the gourd are cut away and the negative space is filled with finely woven bear grass.

In 2016, Johnson collaborated with the Aranda\Lasch architectural studio on an exhibition at the Tucson Museum of Contemporary Art entitled "Meeting the Clouds Halfway," which combined traditional designs using natural desert materials with computer-generated patterns.

Johnson won major top awards at Santa Fe Indian Market, O'odham Tash (the Tohono O'odham annual festival held in February), the Heard Museum Guild Fair, and the Southwest Museum's Indian Art Fair.

== Tohono O'odham Community Action ==
With his business partner Tristan Reader, Terrol Johnson founded Tohono O'odham Community Action (TOCA) in 1996. The nonprofit community development organization operates a basketry cooperative, farms, and sells indigenous foods. Tohono O'odham people have the highest rate of adult-onset diabetes of any ethnic group in the world. TOCA's Tohono O'odham Community Food System provided tribal members with aboriginal desert foods to combat the disease and promote health and sustainability. Foods provided by TOCA include tepary beans, mesquite beans, cholla (cactus) buds, chia seeds, squashes, acorns, and saguaro cactus fruit and syrup.

TOCA received widespread recognition. For his efforts with TOCA, Johnson was named one of the top ten community leaders in 1999 by the Do Something organization. The US President's Committee on the Arts and Humanities gave TOCA the Coming Up Taller Award in 2001. In 2002, both Johnson and Reader won the Ford Foundation's Leadership for a Changing World Award.

In 2011, Johnson was named a White House Food Security "Champion of Change" for his work renewing indigenous food sovereignty.

== "The Walk Home" ==
For two years, Terrol Dew Johnson traveled on a "journey of the heart," a 3000-mile walk across the country with his teenage relatives. Stopping at Native communities to discuss health and culture, "The Walk Home" has celebrated Native foods and health. "The Walk Home" arrived home on March 20, 2010.

== Native Foodways Magazine ==
In 2013, TOCA launched a national magazine covering the community organizing, culinary innovation, and cultural significance of Native American foods. Johnson is the publisher and a significant contributor to the production of the magazine. The magazine and its Facebook page have been central to the Native Food Sovereignty movement, of which Johnson is a part. He is a founding board member of the Native American Food Sovereignty Alliance (NAFSA).
