= Hales Gallery =

Art gallery in London

Coordinates: 51°31′27″N 0°4′26″W

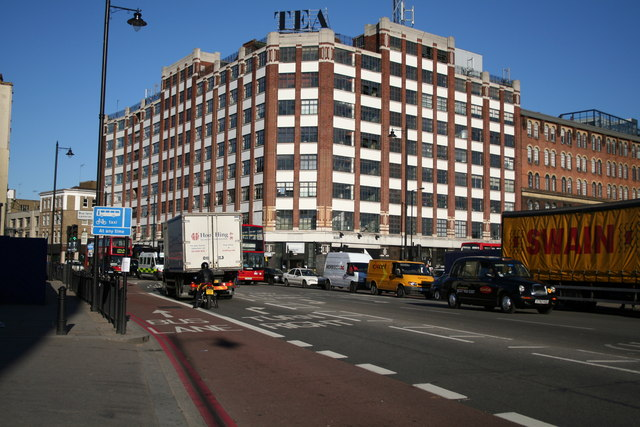
The Tea Building

Hales Gallery is a contemporary London art gallery located on Bethnal Green Road in Shoreditch owned by Paul Hedge and Paul Maslin. Hales Gallery opened in 1992 in Deptford, South London, before moving to the Tea Building, in Shoreditch, London's East End in 2004 and later opening a second space in Chelsea, New York City in 2018.

== History ==
Hales opened its first space in a basement beneath the Revival Cafe on Deptford High Street, South London, in 1992. Hedge divided his time between running the gallery and cooking meals upstairs in the cafe. In this period, Hales launched the careers of a number of British artists, including Jake and Dinos Chapman, whose first show, "We Are Artists", was with the gallery, as well as Mike Nelson (artist) and Sarah Jones.

In 1997 Hales added Hew Locke and Sebastiaan Bremer to their roster, and held exhibitions of Tomoko Takahashi and Spencer Tunick's work.

In 2004 Hales moved to its current gallery space in the Tea Building in Shoreditch, London's East End.

In February 2016 Hales opened an office and viewing room in New York's Lower East Side district, which in September 2017 became the 'Hales Project Room' – a small space for exhibitions and artist's project works. The programme has included exhibitions from Rachael Champion, Jeff Keen and Frank Bowling.

In October 2018 Hales Gallery expanded, opening a new location in Chelsea, New York City. The inaugural exhibition: Foundations, a solo presentation of works by abstract painter Virginia Jaramillo. In 2017, at Frieze New York, Hales presented three works by Virginia Jaramillo (artist) – painted in the 1970s, none of which had been shown in public for four decades.

The gallery represents feminist artist Carolee Schneemann, who had her first ever solo exhibition in London with the gallery, Water Light, Water Needle, in February 2014.
