= Lana Z Caplan =

American artist

- Born: Philadelphia, Pennsylvania
- Education: MFA Massachusetts College of Art and Design, BA, BS Boston University
- Known for: Photography, video, new media, and installation

Lana Z Caplan is an American interdisciplinary artist working in photography, video, film, and interactive media installation.

== Career ==
Caplan earned a BA and BS from Boston University and an MFA from the Massachusetts College of Art and Design.

Working across photography, experimental film and video, interactive installations, and video art, Caplan has exhibited and screened her work internationally. Venues and festivals have included the Museum of Contemporary Art, Tucson, Anthology Film Archives in New York, the Inside-Out Art Museum in Beijing, Museo Tamayo in Mexico City, and the International Short Film Festival Oberhausen.

Her work has received critical coverage in ARTnews and The Boston Globe. Writing in ARTnews, critic Joanne Silver described Caplan's work as a "suggestion of worlds colliding". Reviewing Caplan's exhibition at Gallery NAGA in Boston, Boston Globe critic Cate McQuaid highlighted the three-channel video The Loveliest Mountain of China, which juxtaposes a painterly image of a mountain with tourists having their photographs taken and interviews with people involved in the tourism industry. McQuaid argued that the work addresses the commercialization and packaging of nature, concluding that increasingly elaborate forms of such packaging deepen the "schism between humans and the landscape".

Her 2010 film Sospira is an experimental documentary combining Super 8 and digital video. The film's original score was composed by Chris Brokaw (Come, Codeine) and Kevin Micka (Animal Hospital).

Caplan is an associate professor of Photography and Video at Cal Poly, San Luis Obispo.

== Oceano (for seven generations) ==
Caplan's photographic project Oceano (for seven generations) examines the history and contemporary use of the Oceano Dunes on California's Central Coast. The project developed through several years of research into the area's successive inhabitants and uses.

The project considers overlapping histories of the dunes, including those of the yak titʸu titʸu yak tiłhini Northern Chumash, the Dunites, the 1923 filming of The Ten Commandments, the history of landscape photography associated with the dunes, and contemporary recreational use of the area.

Oceano (for seven generations) was published by Kehrer Verlag as a monograph in 2023. The book includes texts by Matthew Goldman, Hanna Rose Shell, and Mona Olivas Tucker, chair of the yak titʸu titʸu yak tiłhini Northern Chumash tribe.

The project has received independent critical attention. In a 2024 review for FRAMES, W. Scott Olsen discussed the book's presentation of communities with differing relationships to the same landscape and its juxtaposition of competing perspectives. On Lenscratch.com, Aline Smithson described the project as an examination of photographic conventions and landscape histories, noting Caplan's use of collaborative and constructed portraits of past and present inhabitants of the dunes.

The Oceano project was presented in a solo exhibition at the Harvey Milk Photo Center in San Francisco from January 25 through March 1, 2025. The exhibition included photographs and video from the project.
