= Beirut Art Residency =

Lebanese nonprofit art studio

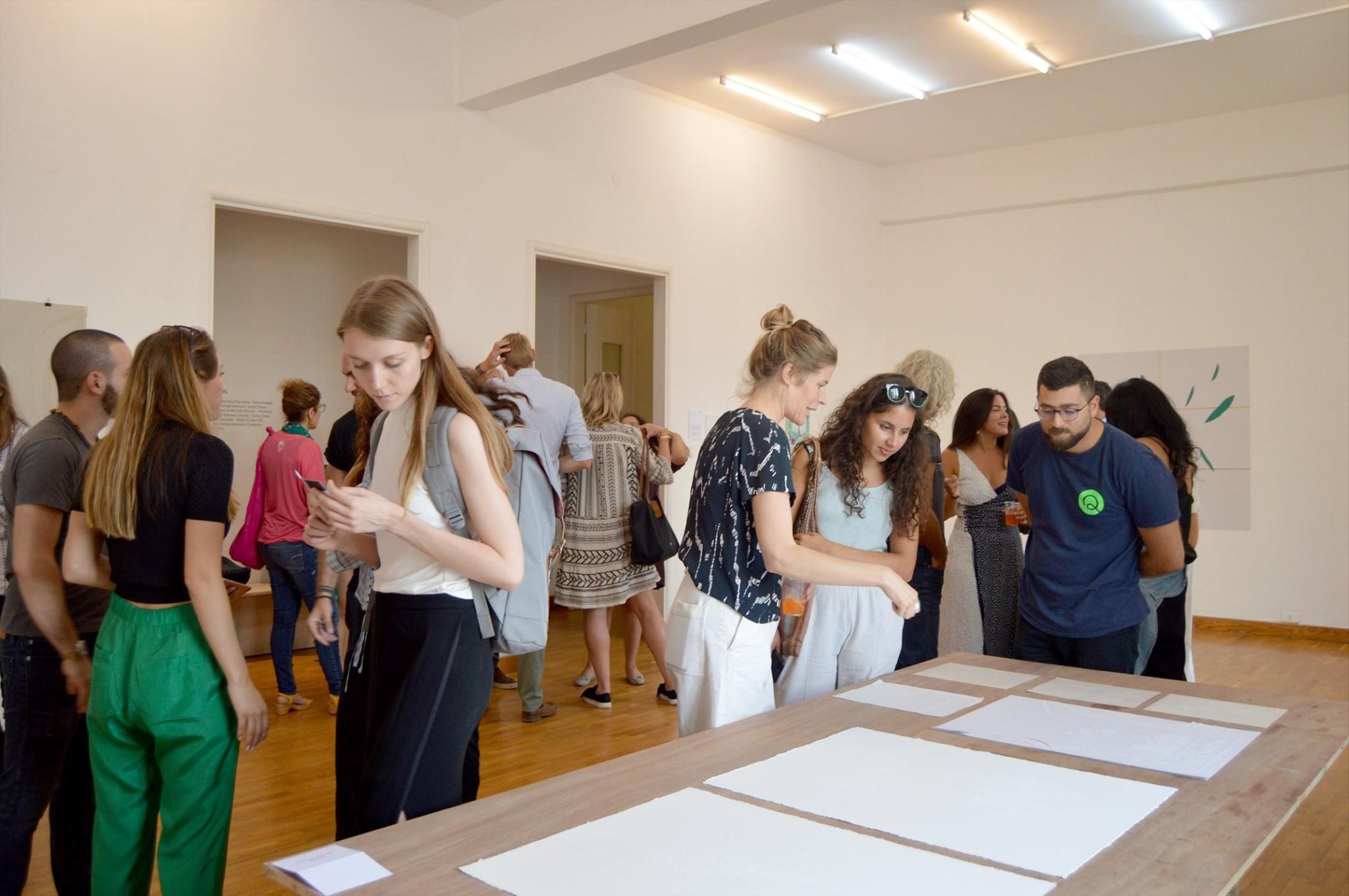
BAR during an Open Studios exhibition, 2019

Beirut Art Residency (BAR) was a non-profit, artist-run interdisciplinary residency based in Beirut, Lebanon.

== Background and program ==
Beirut Art Residency (BAR) was founded in 2015 by Amar A. Zahr and Nathalie Ackawi in Beirut, Lebanon. The project offered a two-month residency program for 3-5 residents at a time. The artist-in-residence program aimed to stimulate creativity through interaction with local environments, artists, and cultural institutions, attempting to foster cross-cultural exchange between participants and Beirut’s artistic community.

The program consisted of artists from various disciplines, such as visual arts, concept and theory, design, film & video, installation, music and sound, performance, photography and curatorial research. It was in Gemmayzeh, which has numerous art galleries. The residency aimed to build community through interaction and engagement and provide a platform for communication between the invited artists and the Lebanese art scene.

A jury of local and international creatives selected the artists at BAR. The jury consisted of the following people:

- Ziad Antar, photographer, filmmaker, and co-founder of the Third Line Gallery
- Sunny Rahbar, director
- Mari Spirito, art historian, photographer, and founder of Protocinema
- Gregory Buchakjian,art historian & photographer
- Myriam Ben Salah, curator and writer

The advisory board also included Ali Khadra, founder of Canvas Magazine, and Middle Eastern art collector Khaled Jalanbo.

== Past Residents ==
- Phase I (September 1 - 1 October 2015): Sara Naim and Athier Mousawi
- Phase II (October 1 - 1 November 2015): Ivana Ivkovic, Lucienne Bestall, and Pierre Dalpé
- Phase III (January 1 - 1 February 2016): Ibi Ibrahim, Lara Ögel, and Evelyn Simons
- Phase IV (April 1 - 1 May 2016): Mary Ann Peters, Naomi Moser, and Amor Herrera
- Phase V (June 1 - 1 July 2016): Dexter Davey, Isaac Blease, Sumiah Salloum, and Asiya Alsharabi
- Phase VI (September 1 - 1 October 2016): Gianna Dispenza and Darryl Westly
- Phase VII (November 1 - 1 December 2016): Rehan Miskci, Nicolas Courdy, and Ragnheidur Gestsdottir
- Phase VIII (January 1 - March 1 2017): Abdelkader Benchamma, Hilda Ekeroth, and Esmeralda Kosmatopoulos

== La Vitrine ==
During the second year of BAR, La Vitrine emerged as a response to the lack of public art in the city. La Vitrine is a four by two meter, high-ceilinged room with a glass door acting as the only separator between the art and the sidewalks of Beirut. Artists are invited on a bi-monthly basis to work on site-specific interventions responding mainly to social issues and public space.
