= Ziad Antar =

Lebanese filmmaker and photographer

Ziad Antar (born 1978 in Saida, Lebanon) is a Lebanese filmmaker and photographer. He studied Agricultural Engineering at the American University of Beirut before turning to video and arts with a residency at the Palais de Tokyo in Paris and a post-diploma of the École nationale supérieure des Beaux-Arts, Paris.

== Life and work ==
Ziad Antar’s short films evoke a world in conflict through a playful tone. In the aftermath of the 2006 Lebanon War, Ziad Antar produced a short film entitled La Marche Turque. The image shows the hands of a pianist playing Mozart’s partition, while the sound is hammered, reminding the one of bombings. In 2002, Antar had directed a documentary film devoted to his mentor, the photographer Jean-Luc Moulène.

In 2000, he acquired a 1948 Kodak Reflex and 10 rolls of black-and-white film that had expired in 1976. He began using this outdated material, producing a blurred and almost abstract effect on his photographs. One of the photographs depict Walid Jumblatt and supposedly evokes the danger the Lebanese Druze leader faces after having criticized Hezbollah and the Syrian government.

== Filmography ==
- Jean-Luc Moulène (2002)
- Tokyo Tonight (2003)
- WA (2004)
- La Marche Turque (2006)
- Safe Sound (2006)
- Mdardara (2007)
- La Corde (2007)
- Le Radar (2007)
- Etudes Mains (2008)
- La Mouche (2008)
- Banana (2008)
- Night of Love (2009)
- La Souris (2009)
- Safe Sound (2009)

== Publications ==
- Beirut Bereft – The Architecture of the Forsaken and Map of the Derelict (Rasha Salti & Ziad Antar), Sharjah Art Foundation, 2009
- Portrait of a territory, Actes Sud/Sharjah Art Foundation, 2012
- Expired, Beaux Arts de Paris Editions and Musée Nicéphore Niepce publication, 2014
- After Images, Contributions by Hans Ulrich Obrist, Yahya Amqassim, Manal Khader, Yasmina Jraissa, Kaph 2016

== Selected exhibitions ==
=== Solo exhibitions ===
- Dark Matter, La Crypte, Beirut in Collaboration with Beirut Art Residency 2017
- Ziad Antar: Safe Sounds II in Collaboration with Beirut Art Residency 2016
- After Images, Beirut Exhibition Center 2016
- Ziad Antar: Expired, Selma Feriani Gallery, London, 2011
- Portrait of a Territory, Arts Area, Sharjah, 2012

=== Group exhibitions ===
- Home Works IV, Galerie Sfeir Semler, Beirut, 2008
- 2008 TaipeiBiennial, Taipei, 2008
- Lebanon Now, Darat al Funun, Amman, 2008
- Provisions for the Future: Past of the Coming Days, Sharjah Biennial 09, Sharjah, 2009
- America, Beirut Art Center, Beirut, 2009
- 21 Shortlisted Artists of the Future Generation Art Prize Group Exhibition, Pinchkuk Art Centre, Kiev, 2010
- The Future of a Promise, 54th Venice Biennale, 2011
- The Mediterranean Approach, Palazzo Zenobio, Venice, 2011
- Art is the answer! Contemporary Lebanese artists and designers, Villa Empain, Brussels, 2012
- Across Boundaries. Focus on Lebanese Photography, curated by Tarek Nahas, Beirut Art Fair 2018
