= Moritz Glik =

Jewelry designer

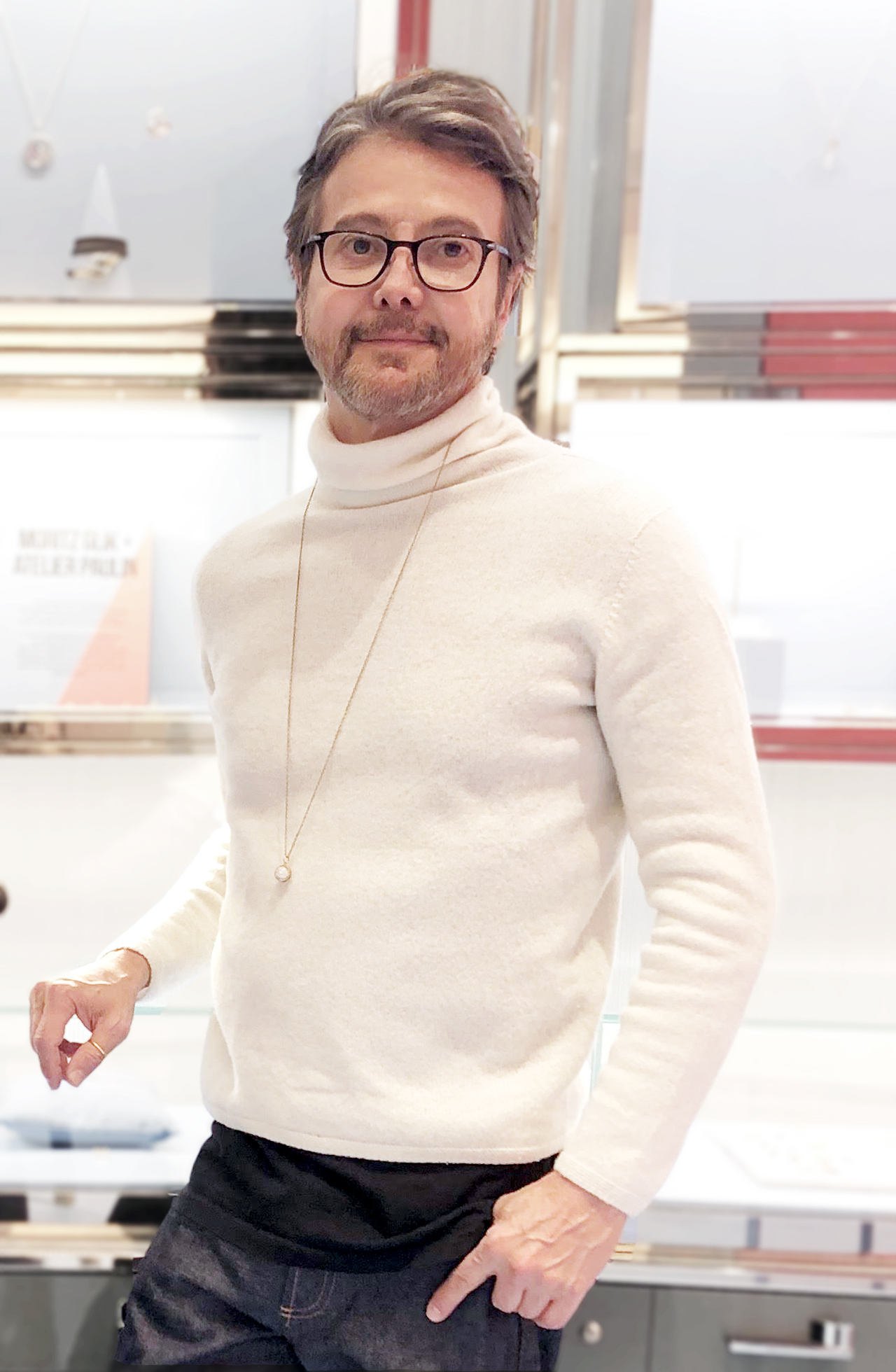
- Born: Moritz Flávio Moreira Glik; Belo Horizonte, Brazil
- Education: Pontifical Catholic University of Minas Gerais
- Occupation: Jewellery designer
- Website: moritzglik.com

Moritz Glik (born August 8, 1962) is a Brazilian naturalized American jewelry designer known as the creator of the Kaleidoscope Shakers.

== Early life and education ==
Moritz Glik was born in Belo Horizonte, Brazil, and developed an early fascination with craftsmanship and handmade objects primarily through his mother, who was a seamstress and taught him how to cut and sew fabric at an early age. His passion for creativity led him to pursue formal training at Pontifícia Universidade Católica de Minas Gerais (PUC-MG) where he received a BA in Advertising and Marketing.

== Career ==
In 2003 Moritz founded his eponymous jewelry brand, Moritz Glik.

One of Moritz Glik's innovations is the creation of the "Kaleidoscope Shaker", where loose precious gemstones are enclosed in capsules made of white sapphire crystal and gold. This technique allows the gemstones to float freely, creating a mesmerizing and dynamic visual effect

His work has been showcased in various publications and media outlets, including Forbes, JCK, InStore, Vogue, InStyle, Cosmopolitan, W, Harper's Bazaar, and the book "Jewelry Shining Stars" by jewelry writer Beth Bernstein.

Moritz has a private showroom and studio in SoHo, New York City, where his pieces are designed and handcrafted.

== Honors and notable collaborations ==
Moritz Glik's honors include being a two-time recipient of the Couture Design Awards for Best Diamond Piece under $20,000 (2011, 2012), presented by The Couture Show in Las Vegas, and the InDesign Award for Diamond Design by InStore Magazine (2016). His collaborations include Vik Muniz and Sebastian Bremer, and the auction house Christie's.
