= Elana Herzog =

American artist

- Born: 1954 (age 71–72); Toronto, Ontario, Canada
- Education: SUNY-Alfred, Bennington College
- Known for: Sculpture, installation art, mixed media
- Awards: John S. Guggenheim Fellowship, Anonymous Was a Woman Award, Louis Comfort Tiffany Foundation, Joan Mitchell Foundation
- Website: Elana Herzog

Elana Herzog is an American installation artist and sculptor based in New York City. She is most known for abstract, tactile works in which she disassembles, reconfigures and embeds second-hand textiles in walls, modular panels and architectural spaces with industrial-grade metal staples. Herzog has been recognized with a Guggenheim Fellowship, Anonymous Was a Woman Award and Louis Comfort Tiffany Foundation Award, among others. She has exhibited nationally and internationally, including at the Brooklyn Museum, Museum of Arts and Design (MAD), Tang Museum, Weatherspoon Art Museum, Sharjah Art Museum, and Reykjavik Art Museum.

Herzog's installations blur distinctions between two-and three-dimensional media, eliciting comparisons to late-modernist painting and drawing, yet they also upend that tradition through a subversive, deconstructive process that emphasizes ephemerality and fragility. Artcritical editor David Brody writes of that process: "Herzog's ambitiously scaled compositions are built up from small, provisional decisions—unruly brushstrokes, in effect—that coalesce into powerful storms of texture." Thematically, Herzog's conversion of household castoffs into minimalist art raises questions about value, ownership and high- and low-culture conventions of taste and beauty; Review Magazine describes her work as a "conceptual, emotional, and gutsy" alternative to most fiber art, which leaves viewers to conjecture on associations between women, fiber and gender stereotypes, the destructive capacities of the creative process, and the layering of history.

Elana Herzog, Valence, wood, drywall, paint, textile, metal staples, steel shelving posts, hardware, 20' x 30' x 4', 2014. Installation, The Boiler (Pierogi), Brooklyn, NY.

== Education and career ==
Herzog was born in 1954 in Toronto, Canada. She studied art at Bennington College (BA, 1977) and Alfred State College (Masters of Fine Arts, 1979). In the 1980s, she worked a variety of blue-collar jobs, including electrician's apprentice, mechanic and construction worker, while producing mixed-media sculpture out of a studio in Williamsburg, Brooklyn. She withheld from exhibiting until 1990, when she participated in a group show at Minor Injury Gallery (Brooklyn) and received a review mention from Roberta Smith in The New York Times.

After turning to textile-based works in the 1990s, Herzog attracted growing attention with several site-specific installations, group shows at White Columns, Hofstra University and the Brooklyn Museum, and solo exhibitions at Black + Herron, Momenta Art, and P.P.O.W. In the 2000s, she installed stapled-textile works at venues including SculptureCenter, Smack Mellon, Herbert F. Johnson Museum of Art, Aldrich Museum of Contemporary Art, and the Drawing Center; in 2009, the Daum Museum of Contemporary Art presented a fifteen-year survey of her work. Since then, she has had solo and two-person exhibitions at LMAK Projects (2011, 2014), The Boiler (Pierogi Gallery, 2014), Studio 10 (2015, 2016), the Sharjah Art Museum (2016), and Western Exhibitions (2018, Chicago), among others.

== Work and reception ==
Elana Herzog, Untitled I, Plastic shower curtains, elastic and plastic curtain rings, dimensions variable, 1996

Herzog's art has been described as a mix of visceral color and texture, formal rigor and whimsy that balances between decorative beauty and violence and "ruin and monument." She works intuitively, through a process-based method of accumulation and subtraction that involves improvisation, context-sensitive experimentation, and labor-intensive, heavy-duty assemblage. Her work bears the formal influence—often irreverently—of minimalists Donald Judd and Frank Stella, Eva Hesse, and site-specific conceptualists Robert Smithson and Gordon Matta-Clark, as well more narrative-based sources, such as Freud and Magritte.

=== Early sculptural works and installations ===
In her early career, Herzog aggressively reconfigured found linens, shower curtains, rugs, drapery and lace, smocking, puckering, cutting and stretching them into minimal sculptures. This work alluded to the body, gender and women's undergarments, nature, cleanliness and privacy. Her first textile work, Rapunzel (1990), featured a long, knotted piece of sheer fabric that hung below an altered, used wooden table and snaked along the floor; in 1995, The New York Times likened her installation of elastic-ringed fabric pieces at the Islip Art Museum to a chamber colonized by caterpillars and candy-striped cocoons or pajamas gone berserk. Reviews also identify Herzog's absurdist regard for the functionality and abjectness of the raw materials; The New Yorker described her 1998 P.P.O.W. show as "amusing, sophisticated formal objects whose poise belies their homely origins."

Art in America critic Nancy Princethal, however, relates Herzog more to postminimalists, such as Mary Kelly and Richard Tuttle—for her focus on formal-spatial properties and exploration of the limits of the acceptable in art—than to contemporary artists engaging domestic materials in debates over "women's art" (e.g., Untitled I, 1996) For the installation The Carpet Paradigm (1998, Wesleyan University), Herzog strewed thousands of square feet of diverse carpet remnants throughout an architecturally altered exhibition space; writers compared the layered formal effects to color field painting and the abstract landscapes of Richard Diebenkorn, while noting allusions to the obsolescence of design and the discard of cultural products in the work's appearing and disappearing patterns.

Elana Herzog, Civilization and Its DisContents, Persian and Persian-type carpets, mixed fabrics and media, and metal staples, dimensions variable, 2003/5. Installation views at Smack Mellon, Brooklyn, NY. Left: close-up view.

=== Stapled textile works ===
In 1999, Herzog began embedding found textiles in walls, movable panels and built surfaces using thousands of heavy-gauge metal staples that often re-inscribed selected patterns in the material. She then deconstructed them through a process of shredding, pulling and cutting; the remaining fragments maintained the rectangular formats of her sources in ghostly, afterimage-like forms that dissolve distinctions between figure and ground. Critics suggest that Herzog's disintegrating imagery and hands-on, violent process of de-materialization both acknowledge and undermine relationships to late-modernist and domestic-craft traditions, while suggesting geological-archaeological and historical themes of impermanence, decay, erosion, memory, absence and presence.

Herzog first exhibited this work in shows at the Kohler Arts Center and GAGA ("Projected") in 2000. Her GAGA exhibition featured six sections of a shredded red bedspread embedded in panels that she integrated with gallery walls to suggest pieces created in situ, rather than modular units. Art in America's James Hyde described the zigzagging remnants as "intimate and architectural, delicate and rough," unconventional drawings with "juicy" surfaces of liquid-like fabric, glistening embroidery-like staples and dislodged chunks of sheetrock. Writers such as Barbara Pollock termed later works "monumental friezes" that recalled Stella's stripe paintings or the monolithic rectangles of Barnett Newman.

Herzog expanded her themes and formal ambitions in four subsequent installations. At the outset of the U.S. War in Iraq, she turned to more specific cultural referents—Persian-style carpets deconstructed to the point of dissolution—in order to convey powerlessness, fragility, the fluidity of cultural meaning, and global power dynamics for Civilization and Its DisContents (Smack Mellon, 2003). At the Herbert F. Johnson Museum (2006), she reconfigured that work alongside carpets and art from the museum's own collection to further those themes. W(e)ave (2007, Aldrich Museum, with sound artist Michael Schumacher) and Plaid (2007, Smack Mellon) signaled Herzog's growing architectural and spatial engagement. W(e)ave featured lacy white bedspread fragments embedded on custom-built walls; Nancy Princethal wrote that the ghostly floral fragments suggested faded memories of the one-time 18th-century residence's eroded decorative motifs. In Plaid, Herzog shifted from pictorial formats to bolder sculptural configurations of built structures and surfaces seemingly invaded by patches or shifting three-dimensional grids of stapled brown wool.

Elana Herzog, W(e)ave, Collaboration with sound artist Michael Schumacher. Heirloom cotton Chenille bedspreads, staples in drywall constructions, 12 speakers, programmed sound, gallery dimensions 12' x 31' x 31', 2007. Installation, Aldrich Museum of Contemporary Art, Ridgefield, CT.

=== Linear textile and later works ===
Herzog's textile works evolved in a more minimal, linear direction beginning with a new, site-specific installation in her Daum Museum survey, Untitled 2009 (Seams). It featured floor-to-ceiling forms that Review Magazine described as "eloquent lines created through violent physical action," resembling frayed seams or fibers forcing their way through walls. She extended this linear work into the gallery space and its built structures in the shows "The Jewel Thief" (2010, Tang Museum) and Into The Fray (2011, LMAK Projects, solo). The former featured the installation, Romancing the Rock, which New York Times critic Holland Cotter described as lines of ripped fabric that "appear to be burning, like corrosive acid in the cube they're stapled to." For Into The Fray, Herzog mounted sections of stapled textiles on fiberboard on to freestanding metal shelving struts, found wood, and walls throughout the space, rendering armature and art indistinguishable; curator Dan Cameron called the show a poetic, "refreshingly anti-academic" deconstruction of late-modernist painting.

In two large installations, Herzog explored history as a cycle of resurrection and collapse, and rationality spiraling into entropy. "SHIFT" (2015, Studio 10) featured 6'–8' amputated tree logs embedded with textile remnants and arranged on tattered Persian rugs that were surrounded by walls punctured with vertical, sutured bits of a sports jacket. Hyperallergic compared the show's elements to "precisely arranged shreds of viscera and lopped-off limbs" that offered a "witheringly beautiful meditation on the murderous elegance of fate." In Valence (2014, The Boiler), Herzog created two overlapping, 17' x 24' surfaces of tattered fabric, staples and paint inspired by the Bauhaus textiles of Anni Albers—one supported by steel shelving posts leaning against a massive brick wall and the other mounted directly to the brick. In 2018, she recreated Valence at the Rubin Foundation's 8th Floor Gallery in a 10'-high version inhabiting a corner in the gallery; writers likened it to intimate, peeling layers of civilization evoking aerial views and underlying structures of urban planning, power relations and global change.

For two international exhibitions, Scale Shifts; Vision Adjusts (2016, Sharjah Museum, UAE) and "Material Migrations" (2017, Artisterium 10, Tbilisi, Georgia), Herzog collected carpets from New York and each show's locale, from which she created largely horizontal works that reference the global movement of culture and allude to (and upend) the Modernist grid and aesthetic.

=== Paper works and books ===
Herzog began working in handmade paper after a residency at the Dieu Donné Papermill in Manhattan (2008–9) suggested similarities between paper production and her own processes of deconstruction and reconstitution. In 2009, she was invited by the publisher Gervais Jaussad to produce an edition of twelve unique artist books pairing her work with poetry by Jerome Rothenberg. She created a second book edition in 2012, Texas, with poetry by Monica de la Torre.

Herzog first foregrounded her works on paper in the show "Plumb Pulp" (2014) at LMAK Projects, which featured books and pieces framed and pressed between glass and backing board that conjoin textile fragments and wet paper pulp into a single substance. Artforum describes the paper work in a second show, "Compression" (2018, Western Exhibitions), as " intense visual stimulants" whose mix of rigid textures and gestural interplay of fabric and pigmented pulp cleverly blur the categories of drawing and collage.

== Awards and recognition ==
Herzog was awarded a Guggenheim Fellowship in 2017 and the Anonymous Was a Woman Award in 2009. She has also received awards from the Foundation for Contemporary Arts, The Saint Gaudens Memorial, Louis Comfort Tiffany Foundation, Joan Mitchell Foundation, and New York Foundation for the Arts, among others. Her artist books belong to the Koopman Collection in the National Library of the Netherlands, the Rare Book Collection of the French National Library, and Rauner Special Collections at Dartmouth College.

Herzog has been recognized with artist residencies from the MacDowell Colony, Sondre Green Farm (Norway), Albers Foundation, Gertrude Contemporary Art Spaces (Australia), Marie Walsh Sharpe Space Program, and Farpath Foundation (France), among others. She has been a visiting artist, lecturer or instructor at Parsons School of Design, Cooper Union, Rhode Island School of Design, Pratt Institute, New York University, The New School, and School of the Art Institute of Chicago, among others. Between 2012 and 2016, Herzog lectured at Yale University.
