= Selin Balci =

Visual artist and biologist

Selin Balcı is a visual artist and biologist who creates works with Petri dishes filled with mold, fungi, and other organisms, and refers to her work as "a living studio." She has exhibited internationally in both group and solo exhibitions.

== Education ==
Balcı earned her Bachelor of Science in Forestry at Istanbul University, Turkey, in 2002, and went on to earn a Bachelor of Fine Arts in Intermedia at West Virginia University in 2008. She received her Master of Fine Arts from the University of Maryland, College Park in 2012.

== Recognition ==
Balcı has been recognized with several fellowships, including an Artist in Residence fellowship at the Virginia Center for the Creative Arts in Amherst, VA, and a College Art Association Professional Development Fellowship. She was both a Hot Picks Artist (2012) and a Project Grant recipient (2014) at Smack Mellon in Brooklyn, NY, and has twice been named a finalist for the Trawick Prize at the Bethesda Contemporary Art Awards in Bethesda, MD for artists from the Washington, D.C., Maryland, and Virginia area (2013 and 2015). Balcı has been featured in several solo and two-person shows in the Washington, DC area, as well as in Maryland and in Istanbul. In 2017, her work was included in the show "Contemporary Artists from Turkey," at the Biennale Arcipelago Mediterraneo in Palermo, Italy. Her work in "Under the Scope" at the Silber Art Gallery of Goucher College in Towson, MD, was the subject of a 2014 Washington City Paper article.

== Technique ==
Balcı, trained in biology, finds her samples in tree bark and soil from her backyard, and sometimes collaborates with her plant pathologist husband for colorful natural material, and stores her specimens in the refrigerator in test tubes. In recent years, Balcı has moved from boards to framed works, and uses Yupo paper as a support, which can withstand the mold growth and emphasizes the texture of her medium. After sterilizing her Yupo paper, she coats it in potato dextrose agar to feed the colonies, and waits one to two months for her composition to grow. Although she has used the term "living" to describe her works, she no longer exhibits living specimens—instead she allows them to dry out and prevents new growth with a layer of acrylic. Along with boards and frames, she has recently exhibited her works in Petri dishes arranged in shapes such as a map of the world or on Yupo paper covered with watch glasses to magnify certain elements of the growths. Balcı studies how microorganisms behave and relate to one another before beginning new projects, and is interested in how their interactions reflect conflicts and boundaries in the human world.
