= Bryan Zanisnik =

Contemporary artist

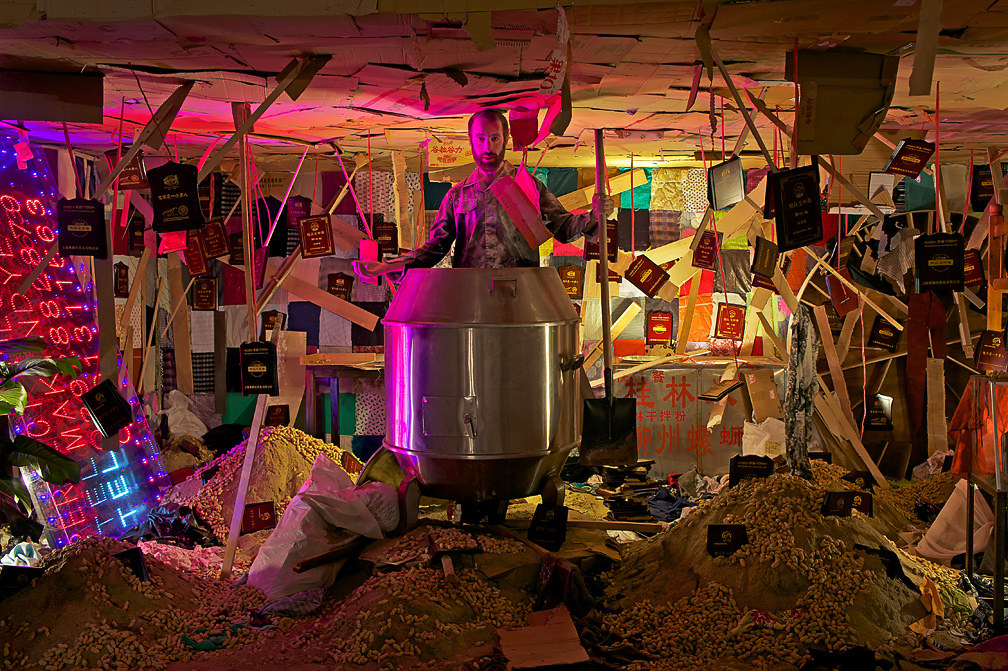
Museum of Americans in China, Site-Specific Installation and Performance, 2011

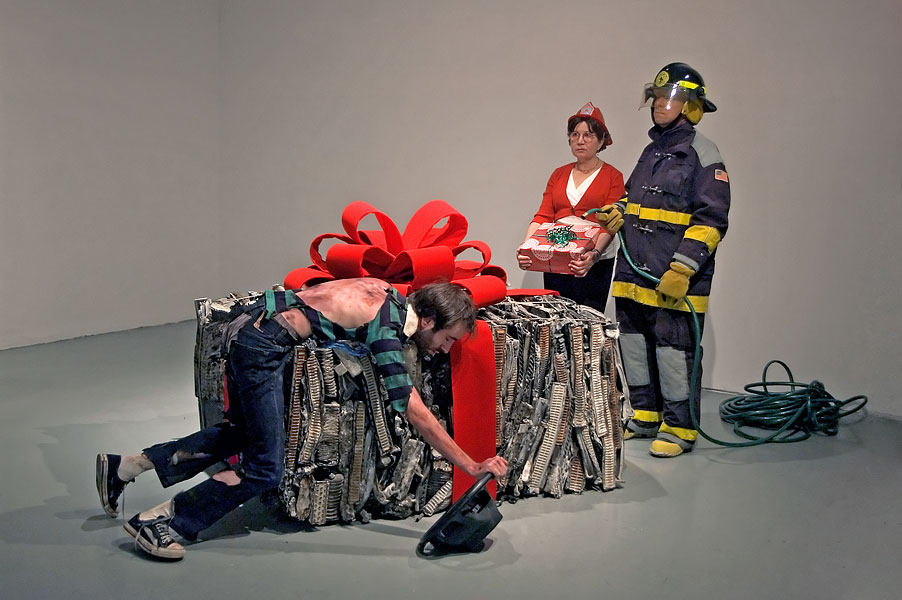
When I Was a Child I Caught a Fleeting Glimpse, Performance, 2009

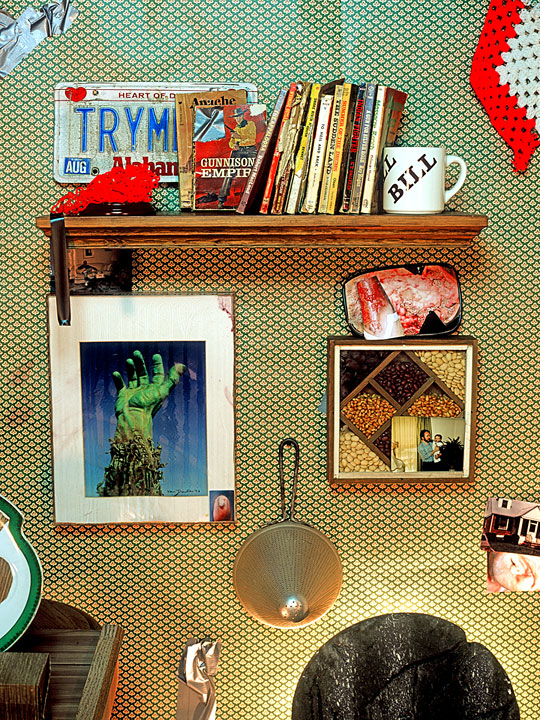
To Hell and Back (Nothing), 40" x 30", C-Print, 2008

Bryan Zanisnik is a contemporary artist working in video, performance, photography, and installation. Zanisnik's multidisciplinary practice uses objects en masse to explore American culture, Freudian psychology, and familial relationships. His site-specific installations have addressed diverse subjects, including a crumbling library of Philip Roth novels, an entropic swamp littered with Northern New Jersey waste, and an Americana museum reconstructed in Guangzhou, China. Critic David Duncan commented that Zanisnik "comical impartation of dubious history and catalogue of trivial possessions sidestep sentimentality while conveying a fascination with the type of inherited narrative that gets passed down in close-knit families."

In the spring of 2012 Zanisnik was involved in a legal battle with Philip Roth over the use of Roth's The Great American Novel in his performance at the Abrons Arts Center. According to Artnet magazine, "the law firm representing author Philip Roth personally served performance artist Bryan Zanisnik with a cease and desist letter at the Abrons Arts Center on New York's Lower East Side, where Zanisnik was in the midst of staging Every Inch a Man, a performance that involves locking himself inside a Plexiglass case while he silently reads Roth's The Great American Novel and a fan blows old baseball cards and money into the air around him."

Since 2002 Zanisnik has photographed and written about the Meadowlands, a polluted swamp in northern New Jersey. Focused on the objects discarded within the landscape, Zanisnik was known to have had encounters with local police, environmental scientists, hobo encampments, and homeland security. Critic Christine Smallwood said Zanisnik's "photo essay in Triple Canopy 'Beyond Passaic' documents the author's illegal wanderings in New Jersey's heavily polluted and largely neglected Meadowlands. Inspired by Robert Smithson, himself famously inspired by the region, Zanisnik walks abandoned train tracks, finds discarded objects, and discovers a hobo encampment under a bridge. While Smithson was drawn to 'geology and rock quarries, monumental vacancies and ruins in reverse', Zanisnik is interested in the legal ambiguity of the space, its toxicity, and the people living on its waste."

== Personal life and education ==
Zanisnik was born in Union, New Jersey in 1979. He received a B.A. from Drew University and an M.F.A. from Hunter College. He has completed residencies at the Skowhegan School of Painting and Sculpture, the Lower Manhattan Cultural Council Workspace Program, the Smack Mellon Artist Studio Program, the MacDowell Colony, the Art Omi International Artists Residency, and the Guangdong Times Museum in Guangzhou, China.

He is married to Anna Kaschel, formerly a fashion designer at H&M. She is German; they met at a New Year's Eve party in Brooklyn in 2014.

== Exhibitions ==
He has exhibited and performed in New York at MoMA PS1, SculptureCenter and the Queens Museum of Art; in Philadelphia at the Institute of Contemporary Art and the Fabric Workshop and Museum; in Miami at the De La Cruz Collection; in Chicago at the Museum of Contemporary Photography; in Los Angeles at LAXART; and internationally at the Kunsthalle Exnergasse in Vienna and the Futura Centre for Contemporary Art in Prague. Zanisnik’s work has been reviewed in The New York Times, Art in America, Artforum, and ARTnews, amongst others. He is included in Art:21's documentary series New York Close Up and is a contributing writer at Triple Canopy.
