= Robert Melee =

American artist

Robert Melee (born 1966) is an artist, based in NYC and Asbury Park, New Jersey.

Melee was born in New Jersey. He makes multimedia art – videos, installations, collages. – His work is often compared to that of John Waters and Andy Warhol due to its overt campiness. He is also a painter.

He attended the School of Visual Arts in New York City from 1986 to 1990.

== Selected exhibitions ==
2009

"Robert Melee in City Hall Park"' NYC

2008

"Unshamelessfulnessly", Andrew Kreps Gallery, NYC

2007

Painting the Edge, Gallery Hyundai (Do Art), Korea

"The Lath Picture Show", Fredrich Pretzel Gallery, NYC

2006

Robert Melee's Poplar, Ingalls & Associates, Miami

2005

Greater New York, P.S.1 Contemporary Art Museum, New York

Stage Works and Substitutions, Sutton Lane Gallery, London

"In Between False Comforts", Andrew Kreps Gallery, NYC

"Robert Melee's Talent Show"' the Kitchen, NYC

2004

"Currents:31 Robert Melee", Milwaukee Art Museum, Milwaukee

2003

Greetings from New York: A Painting Show, Galerie Thaddaeus Ropac, Salzburg

Robert Melee, Art Statements, Art 34 Basel, Switzerland

"This Is For You"', Judson Church, NYC

2002

Wonderland, Aeroplastics Contemporary, Brussels

Super-Heroes, Galerie Edward Mitterrand, Geneva

You, Me and Her, Andrew Kreps Gallery, New York

2001

Robert Melee’s Unit, Corcoran Museum, Washington D.C.

2000

Mount Miami, Tel Aviv Artists Studio, Tel Aviv

Units, Jay Jopling / White Cube, London

"Robert Melee's UNIT"', Andrew Kreps Gallery, NYC

1999

Group Show, Cartervous & Time, Wales
