= Sebastiaan Bremer =

Dutch artist (born 1970)

- Born: 27 June 1970 (age 56); Amsterdam
- Known for: Painting, Photography

Sebastiaan Bremer (born 27 June 1970) is a Dutch artist who lives and works in New York City.

== Work ==
Born in Amsterdam, Bremer attended the open studio program at the Vrije Academie in The Hague from 1989 until 1991. During his early years he meticulously reproduced personal photographs in paint. He received the Werkbeurs Grant from FBKVB in the Netherlands and moved to New York in 1992 where he began to work primarily in black and white, reemphasizing his connection to photography.

In 1994 he had his first solo show at Galerie Reisel in the Netherlands and began both exhibiting in group shows and curating them. He was assistant to several artists in New York, and worked on production for the photographers Inez and Vinoodh from 1996 until 2000.

In 1998, he produced Liza May Post's 'Trying' film and photograph. In that same year he attended the Skowhegan School of Painting and Sculpture in Maine where he began experimenting with murals, collage paintings, and began drawing directly on photographs, the style which he continues to use today.

In 1999, he finished his first large scale Ink on C-Print drawing entitled 10 AM-PM.

His ink-on-photograph piece, Avila, was included in a 2001 review by Inez van Lamsweerde where she wrote: "[Bremer] invents a poetic braille made up of text, personal symbols and ghostly shapes that, when integrated with their complex grounds, disappear again, buried in a sea of suspended dots. By slowly and laboriously painting on top of quickly taken snapshots, Bremer slows down time to render an interior landscape."

In 2001, he had a solo debut, 'Veronica' at Roebling Hall, New York. His work is part of several important collections in the US and abroad, including the Victoria & Albert Museum, The MoMA, Zabludowicz Trust, the Rabobank collection and Lodeveans Contemporary LLP.

A new solo exhibition of his work opened May 2, 2008 in Galerie Barbara Thumm, Berlin. In the same year he worked on a small edition of jewelry pieces in collaboration with Moritz Glik for Karen LaGatta editions, a commission for the Rabobank in the Netherlands and new works for various group shows, as well as an upcoming solo show at Mia Sundberg Galleri in Stockholm.

== Selected exhibitions ==
=== Solo exhibitions ===
2008

- Solo show at Voltahalle, Hales Gallery, Basel
- Cold Turkey, Galerie Barbara Thumm, Berlin, DEU

2006

- Kraaij, Hales Gallery, London, UK
- Sebastiaan Bremer, Roebling Hall, NY, NY, USA

2005

- Sub Neblina Use Luz Baixa, Gemeente Museum, The Hague, NLD
- Galica, Milan, ITA

2004

- Seething, Lying And Other Work, Satellite, NY, NY, USA
- Monkey, Air de Paris, Paris, FR

2003

- Sebastiaan Bremer, 303 Gallery at White Box, Mari Spirito curator, NY, NY, USA
- Vanishing Point, Roebling Hall, Brooklyn, NY, USA
- You’ve Made Your Mother Cry, Galerie Barbara Thumm, Berlin, DEU

2002

- Janus, Schaper Sundberg Gallery, Stockholm, SWE
- Sebastiaan Bremer, Ybakatu Gallery, Curitiba, BRA

2001

- Veronica, Roebling Hall, Brooklyn, NY, USA
- Hotel Lydmar, curated by Thomas Nordanstad, Stockholm, SWE

2000

- Melanchromia, Ybakatu Gallery, Curitiba, BRA

1994

- Sebastiaan Bremer, Gallery Reisel, Rotterdam, NLD

=== Group exhibitions ===
2008

- When it’s a photograph, curated by Soo Kim, Bolsky Gallery, Otis College of Art and Design, Los Angeles, CA, USA
- MULTIVERSE, curated by Pilar Tompkins, Claremont Museum of Art, CA, USA
- Your Documents Please, MAC-Itami, Japan
- Versions of Reality, curated by Lee Stoetzel, selections from the West Collection, NEXT, Chicago
- When it's a photograph, curated by Soo Kim, Bolsky Gallery, Los Angeles, CA, USA
- Passed as present, York Art Gallery, York, UK

2007

- Inaugural show, Mia Sundberg Galeri, Stockholm, SWE
- In het woud - op zoek naar betekenis, Armando Museum, Amersfoort, NLD
- Photoplus, curated by Lilly Wei, Blue Star Contemporary Art Center, TX, USA
- Out of True, Byblos Gallery, Verona, ITA
- The End Begins, curated by Gil Hedley, selections from the Lodevans Collection, London, UK
- Unseen, Roebling Hall, Chelsea, NY, USA
- ICPNY Selections 2007, curated by James Siena, ICPNY, USA
- The Photograph as Canvas, curated by Stephen Maine, The Aldrich Museum of Contemporary Art, Ridgefield, CT, USA

2006

- Out of True, curated by Micaela Giovannotti & Joyce Korotkin, part of Art Basel Miami
- I Walk the Lines, Galerie Barbara Thumm, Berlin, DEU

2005

- Stay Inside, Shoshanna Wayne Gallery, LA, USA

2004

- Is One Thing Better Than Another? Galerie Aurel Scheibler, Cologne, DEU
- Pin-Up: Contemporary Collage and Drawing, Tate Modern, London, UK
- Sugar Hiccup, Taka Ishii Gallery, Tokyo, JPN
- Curious Crystals of Unusual Purity, PS1/MoMA, curated by Bob Nickas Queens, NY, USA
- Drawn/Quartered, Southeastern Center for Contemporary Art, Winston-Salem, NC, USA
- Off the Wall: Works from the JP Morgan Chase Collection, Bruce Museum, Greenwich, CT, USA
- Open House: Working in Brooklyn, Brooklyn Museum, Brooklyn, NY, USA
- Home Extension, Albany University Museum, curated by Gregory Volk and Sabine Russ, Albany, NY, USA

2003

- Obsession, Galica, curated by L. M. Barbero, Milan, ITA
- Game Over, Grimm Rosenfeld Gallery, Munich, DEU
- The Ballroom Show, Gimm- Eis Gallery, Copenhagen, DNK
- Some Panoramas, Pump House Gallery, curated by Paul Hedge, London, UK
- The Photography Gallery, Victoria & Albert Museum permanent collection, London, UK
- Ybakatu Gallery, Curitiba, BRA
- Far Away, So Close, Clare Weiss Fine Arts, New York, NY, USA
- Group Show, Mia Sundberg Galleri, Stockholm, SWE
- Water, Water, Rotunda Gallery, curated by Lily Wei, Brooklyn, NY, USA

2002

- Paris/Brooklyn, Filles du Calvaire, Paris, FRA
- Transformer II, Air de Paris, curated by Inez van Lamsweerde, Paris, FRA
- Quase Desenho, Adriana Penteado, São Paulo, BRA
- Recent Works, Zabriskie Gallery, New York, NY, USA

2001

- Fast Fwd: Miami, Roebling Hall, Miami, FL, US
- Song Poems, Cohen, Leslie & Brown, curated by Steven Hull, New York, NY, USA

2000

- Figured Out, Spencer Brownstone Gallery, New York, NY, US
- Groupshow, Bellwether Gallery, Brooklyn, USA
- Lightness, Marcello Marvelli Fine Arts, New York, NY, USA
- Aspects of Contemporary Landscape, Marcello Marvelli Fine Arts, New York, NY, USA
- MeatMarket Art Fair, Roebling Hall, New York, NY, USA
- White, Nicolai Fine Arts, curated by Irina Popiashvili, New York, NY, USA
- 3D, Zingmagazine, New York, NY, USA
- Polar Bear In A Snow Storm, Mills Gallery, Boston Center for the Arts, Boston, MA, USA

1999

- Sebastiaan Bremer/Vince Szarek Gallery Untitled, curated by Steven Cochran, Dallas, TX, USA
- The Stroke, Exit Art, curated by Shahzia Sikander, New York, NY, USA
- Blueprint, Spark Gallery, New York, NY, USA
- Anti –World, Gallery Untitled, curated by Marcos Rosales, Dallas, TX, USA

1998

- Bank Holiday, Skowhegan School of Painting and Sculpture, Skowhegan, ME, USA
- Imagination Dead Imagine, Silverstein Gallery, New York, NY, USA

1996

- The Art Market, Gen Art, New York, NY, USA

1995

- Thicket on the Lamb, Thicket Gallery, New York, NY, USA

1992

- Protectors, Bloom Gallery, Amsterdam, NLD

== Collections ==
His work is part of several important collections in the United States and abroad, including the Victoria & Albert Museum, The MoMA, Zabludowicz Trust, the Rabobank Collection and Lodeveans Contemporary LLP.
