= Michael Waugh (artist) =

Michael Waugh is a New York-based artist whose primary medium is drawing.

Known for his large-scale satirical drawings that are meticulously rendered, Waugh incorporates whole texts such as presidential inauguration speeches, excerpts from Edward Gibbon's Decline and Fall of the Roman Empire, and notable bureaucratic documents such as those that coalesced around the privatization of social security and the investigation into the assassination of President Kennedy.

Waugh has exhibited in group shows at Ronald Feldman Fine Art and in exhibitions curated by Bill Arning and Phong Bui. He showed in "Chelsea Visits Havana" at the Museo Nacional de Bellas Artes during the 2009 Havana biennial and is represented by Schroeder Romero & Shredder (formerly Schroeder Romero Gallery) in New York City.

== Education ==
Waugh received a B.A. in history from the University of Texas at Austin and an M.A. in studio art from New York University.
