= Allison Miller (artist) =

American painter

Allison Miller (born 1974 in Evanston, Illinois) is a contemporary painter based in Los Angeles.

== Early life and education ==
Miller earned a Bachelor of Fine Arts from the Rhode Island School of Design in 1996. She later received a Master of Fine Arts from the University of California, Los Angeles in 2001.

== Professional career ==
Miller has held multiple solo exhibitions at galleries across the United States, including at ACME., The Pit in Los Angeles, and Susan Inglett Gallery, New York. She exhibited at the first Los Angeles biennial, Made in L.A. 2012, that was organized by the Hammer Museum in 2012. Her work has been included in other group exhibitions at the Santa Barbara Museum of Art, the Bregenzer Kunstverein in Austria, and the Orange County Museum of Art. Several public collections currently hold Miller's work, including the Orange County Museum of Art; the Santa Barbara Museum of Art; The Pizzuti Collection; The West Collection; and, Vassar College, New York.

=== Work ===
Miller's paintings typically combine multiple media, such as oil paint, acrylic paint, pencil, and dirt. Her work utilizes bright colors, bold forms and textures, and tentative and improvised sketchy lines.

Her practice is often guided by uncertainty and unexpectedness that allows her to "build" each painting with layers of elements. The artist states, "Since there is no real planning involved in the making of the paintings, they are as much a surprise to me as to anybody looking at them." Daniel Gerwin, in a 2016 article for the Los Angeles Review of Books, praised Miller for being a "master" of negative capability, the ability to work through and within a state of uncertainty. He posited that "Miller's capacity for the unknown allows her to arrive at novel and fascinating outcomes in her paintings, with unpredictability the most notable through-line." In a review of the artist's 2018 exhibition Feed Dogs at Susan Inglett Gallery, The Brooklyn Rail wrote that "Miller has been refining [for the past decade] a disarming, vernacular abstraction that maximizes the associative propensities of form and color and dramatizes the essential subjectivity of visual experience."

Allison Miller is represented by Susan Inglett Gallery, New York. Additionally, she is a Senior Lecturer in the MFA Fine Arts program at the Otis College of Art and Design.
