= Kerri Scharlin =

American painter and conceptual artist

Kerri Scharlin is an American painter and conceptual artist who lives and works in New York City. She is known for a series of conceptual projects made in the 1990s that explored identity through the outsourcing of self portraiture to observers such as police sketch artists, art students, and magazine profilers. The New York Times said her works are “proof that identity is not fixed, that one’s persona and possibly even one’s self are malleable and fluid, capable of continual adjustment.”

== Early life and education ==
Scharlin grew up in Miami, FL. She earned a BA from Barnard College, a BFA from School of Visual Arts, and attended the Hunter College MFA program.

== Work ==
=== Witnessed ===
From 1991-1993 Scharlin asked artist friends to describe her to police sketch artists. She then photographically enlarged and exhibited the resulting portraits.

=== The Big Nothing or Le Presque Rien ===
In 1992 Scharlin curated "The Big Nothing or Le Presque Rien" at the New Museum. The artists in the show included Janine Antoni, Fred Wilson, Wendy Jacob, Sam Samore, Gary Simmons, Devon Dikeou, and Rirkrit Tiravanija. The exhibition featured works that were subtle or invisible, appearing at first glance as an empty room.

=== Student body ===
In 1993, Scharlin put up fliers advertising herself as a free live model for art students in exchange for the drawings and sculptures of her body. She exhibited the resulting works at Dooley LeCappellaine Gallery in New York. Artforum said of the project that:

In inverting the traditional relationship between artist and “muse,” Scharlin sought to examine its social and economic nexus. Scharlin’s work asks one to imagine the differences that would exist in the system of capital surrounding the work of art, and in art-historical discourse, if Manet’s Olympia or Ingres’ Odalisque had controlled the means of production.

=== Interview ===
For the project Interview, Scharlin commissioned writers, photographers, and graphic designers from well known publications to create articles about her in the style of their respective publications. These publications included Self, Allure, G.Q., Vanity Fair, and Psychology Today and the tone and style of the coverage shifts accordingly in each article. The New York Times said this work "places Ms. Scharlin in a tradition of what might be called performance photography; it includes Lynda Benglis, Chris Burden, Cindy Sherman, and Jeff Koons."

=== Diary ===
In 1997 Scharlin commissioned writer/ producers from famous television shows - The Simpsons, NYPD Blue, Caroline in the City, One Life to Live, Beavis and Butt-Head, Thirtysomething, and My So Called Life - to turn passages from her diary into five minute scripts in the style of their respective shows. She displayed storyboards based on their scripts, as well as videos of thirty-five actresses auditioning for the role of "Kerri Scharlin", at Wooster Gardens in New York.

=== Girls' School ===
In 2006, Scharlin a group of paintings that were inspired by her daughter's attendance of a private school in Manhattan. Artnet called the paintings, "scary, eroticized Children of the Corn work which stared back cunningly".

=== In Her Studio ===
In 2019, Scharlin showed a series of works of women artists in their studios. She sourced imagery using the internet and rendered these paintings in an "Expressionistic figurative style that harks back to Fauvism, Der Blaue Reiter and Bonnard." The paintings were envisioned as an "invitation to friendship" or a way of building community.

== Exhibitions ==
Scharlin has had solo exhibitions at Dooley LeCappellaine, New York (1993), Postmasters Gallery, New York (1993), Jose Freire Gallery, New York (1994), Schaper Sundberg Galleri, Stockholm (1995), Wooster Gardens, New York (1997), Kustera Tilton Gallery, New York (2006), and New Release Gallery, New York (2019).

She curated the show The Big Nothing or Le Presque Rien at the New Museum in 1992.

== Personal life ==
Scharlin lives in New York with her husband Peter. She has a son and daughter.
