= Sarah Zapata =

American textile artist (born 1988)

- Born: 1988 (age 37–38); Corpus Christi, Texas, U.S.
- Education: Bachelor of Fine Arts Degree in Fibers from the University of North Texas
- Known for: textile artist
- Notable work: To Teach or To Assume Authority (2018-2019); A Famine of Hearing (2019); Standing on the Edge of Time (2019)

Sarah Zapata (1988) is an American textile artist based in Brooklyn, New York City. Her works address themes of labor, systems of power, queerness, and the intersection of identity.

== Early and personal life ==
Zapata was born in Corpus Christi, Texas in 1988 to a Peruvian father and American mother. She was raised near Dallas in an Evangelical Christian household. She became interested in fabric and textile arts from a young age, feeling that clothing was one of the only things she could control. She earned her Bachelor of Fine Arts Degree in Fibers from the University of North Texas in 2011.

She lives in the Red Hook neighborhood of Brooklyn, New York City. Zapata identifies as a queer artist.

== Career ==
Zapata is recognized for her distinctive textile-heavy artwork. Her pieces and latch-hooked carpets veer toward abstraction and perception while drawing inspiration from traditional Peruvian weaving. The majority of Zapata's works include hand-weaving, which is a very time consuming and labor intensive process. Hand-weaving incorporates both traditional and contemporary elements that add to its effect. The duration and endurance that go into hand-weaving make Zapata feel like she has to earn the work.

Her early work was woven from telephone book paper. Since moving to New York City, Zapata has embraced bright colors in her works. This was born initially out of a need to find cheap materials; Zapata worked for a yarn company, and took home materials that would otherwise be thrown out.

Zapata's abstract woven artworks symbolically represent her intersectional identities such as her Christian religious upbringing or her gender identity. Zapata’s body of work address issues like labor, systems of power and control, and queerness.

Zapata's work has gained more exposure since 2017. Her work has been shown throughout the United States, Mexico, and Peru. In 2016, she was the artist-in-residence at the Museum of Art and Design in New York City.

Notable works by Zapata include: To Teach or To Assume Authority (2018-2019), A Famine of Hearing (2019) and Standing on the Edge of Time (2019).

=== Solo exhibitions ===
- Siempre X (2015-2016), El Museo del Barrio, Manhattan, New York City
- a resilience of things not seen (2022-2023), John Michael Kohler Arts Center, Sheboygan, Wisconsin
- So the roots be known (2023-2024), Kemper Museum of Contemporary Art, Missouri

=== Collections ===
- El Museo del Barrio, Manhattan, New York City
- Museum of Art and Design, Manhattan, New York City
- Lima Art Museum, Lima, Peru
