= Smack Mellon =

Nonprofit arts organization in Brooklyn

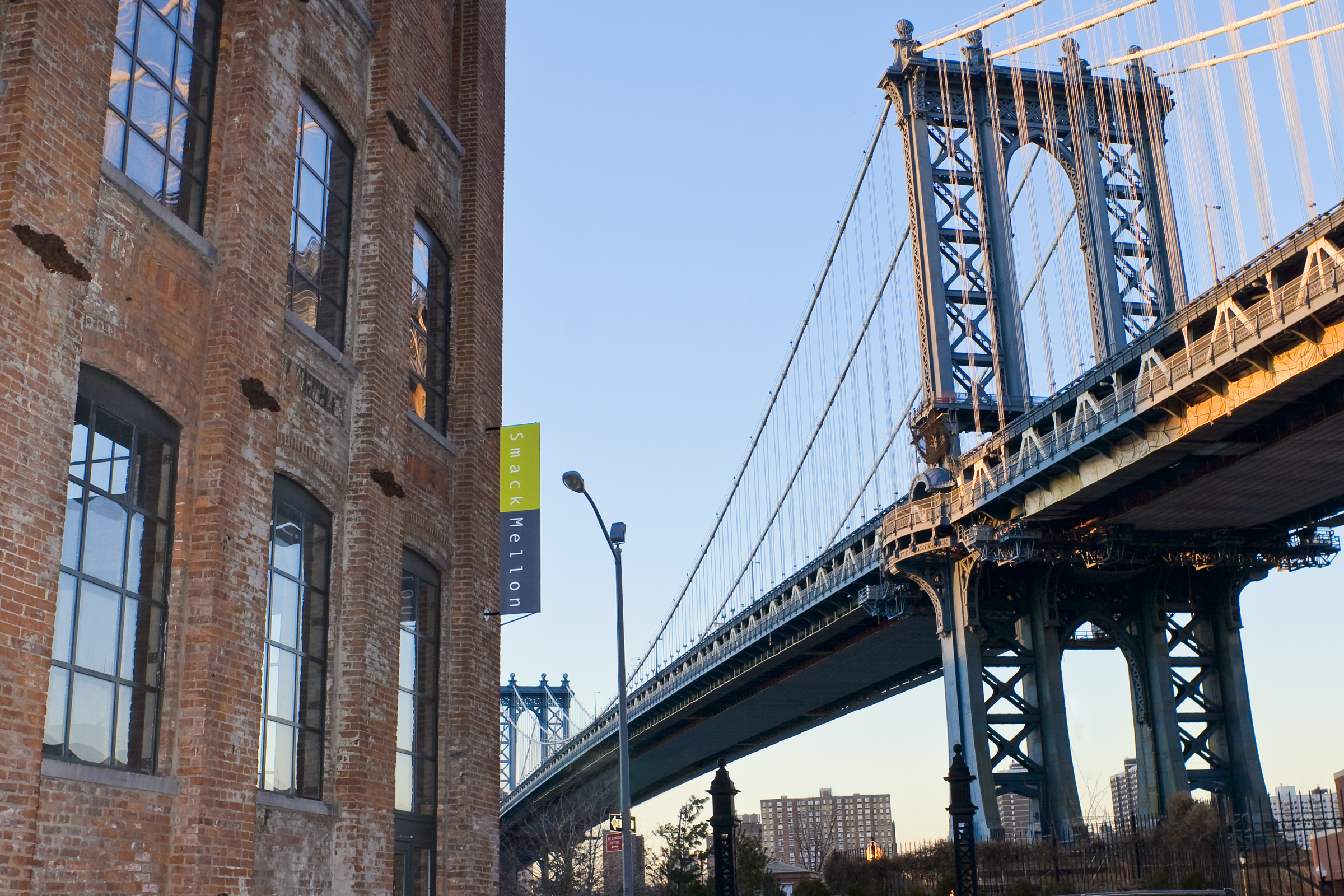
- Entrance to Smack Mellon on 92 Plymouth Street with the Manhattan Bridge in the background.
- Established: 1995
- Location: 92 Plymouth Street, Dumbo, Brooklyn, NY 11201
- Website: http://www.smackmellon.org/

Smack Mellon is a non-profit arts organization located at 92 Plymouth Street, in Dumbo, Brooklyn. Smack Mellon supports emerging, under-recognized mid-career, and women artists through a highly regarded exhibition program, competitive studio residency, and technical support to realize new and ambitious projects.

== History ==
Smack Mellon was founded in 1995 in Dumbo, Brooklyn by artist Andrea Reynosa and musician Kevin Vertrees in their live/work loft space at 135 Plymouth Street, #306 when the neighborhood consisted of abandoned warehouse buildings and a sparsely populated pioneering class of artist do-it-yourselfers. Since its inception the organization has produced numerous exhibitions, and presented the work of hundreds of artists in four different locations in DUMBO. In 1997 Smack Mellon founding Executive Director Andrea Reynosa brokered a partnership with the Walentas family and their company Two Trees Management for a temporary dedicated space at 81 Washington Street for the exhibition Lost and Found featuring the work of Harmony Hammond and emerging Brooklyn based talent. At that time, Two Trees had a number of vacant historic, industrial properties throughout DUMBO and was interested in providing their spaces to not-for-profit organizations to use for cultural programming. From 1999 to 2005 Smack Mellon occupied a Civil War-era iron foundry at 56 Water Street, which had been turned into a spice milling and grinding facility in the 1950s. Since 2005 Smack Mellon has been located at 92 Plymouth Street in a former coal-fired boiler house that provided steam for heat and power to several industrial buildings in the neighborhood.

== Exhibitions ==
Today, Smack Mellon’s Exhibition Program continues to advance public interest in the visual arts while providing opportunities for emerging and under-recognized visual artists whose opportunities for exhibition have been limited to realize ambitious projects. Smack Mellon enables roughly thirty artists each year - 60% of whom are women - to create and present large-scale work to the public in their 6,000 sq ft gallery. Smack Mellon features a wide range of work, including sculpture, installation art, painting, photography, film/video, and site specific projects. Smack Mellon provides opportunities for solo exhibitions to artists who do not have commercial gallery representation in NYC.

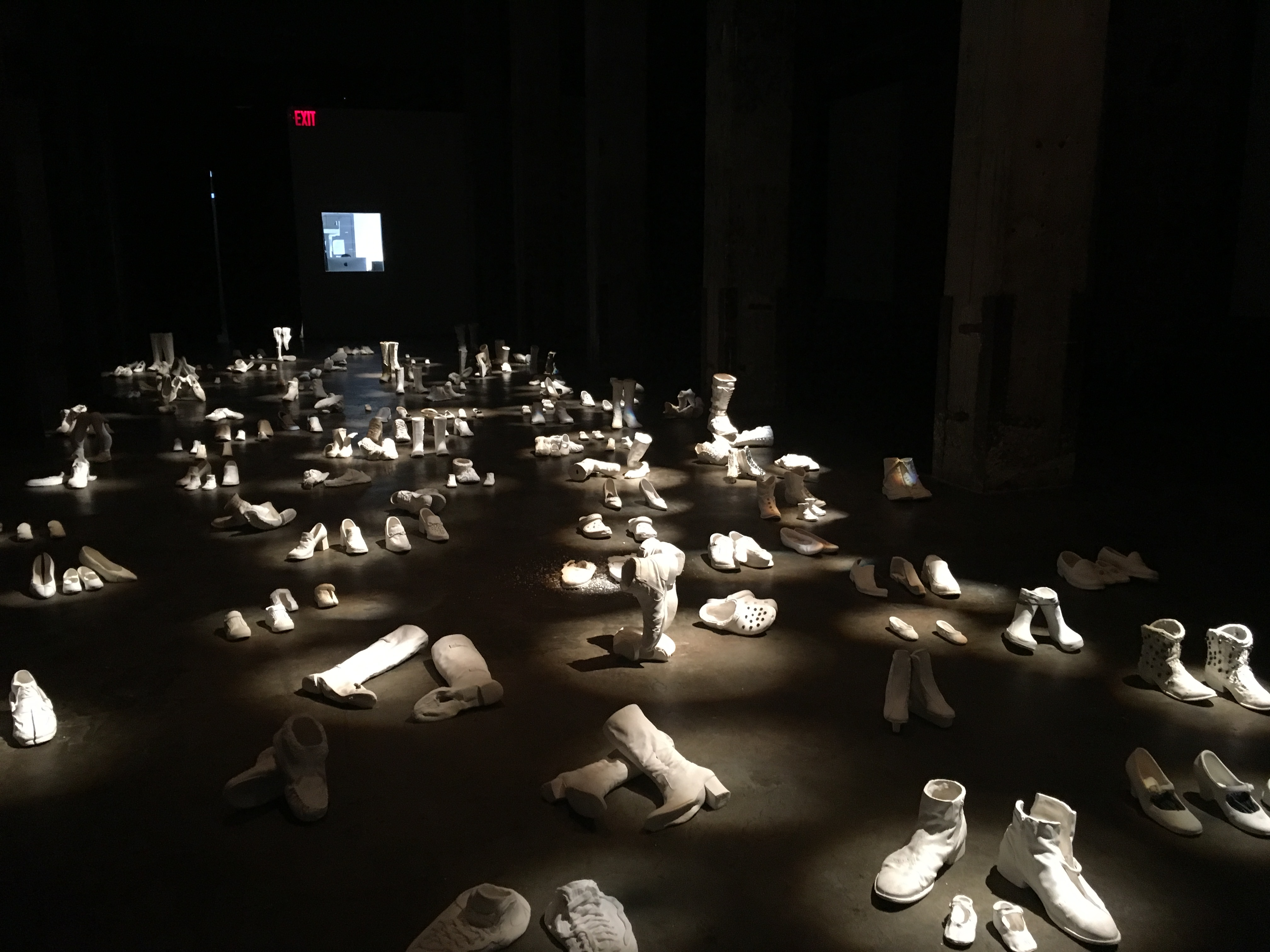
Beyond, Beyond by Ron Baron at Smack Mellon, 2017

Previous exhibitions have included the critically acclaimed RESPOND, which was a direct response to the continued failure of the United States to protect its black citizens from police discrimination and violence, after learning of the grand jury's decision to not indict Officer Daniel Pantaleo for the death of Eric Garner.

Smack Mellon's exhibitions have received multiple rewards for best show during the Dumbo Art Festival. In 2013 Bryan Zanisnik's exhibition at Smack Mellon was awarded the prize of best exhibition; and the following year Saya Woolfalk's ChimaTEK won the award.

=== Exhibition History ===
2016 Two Solo Exhibitions: Christine Sciulli ROIL and Nona Faustine White Shoes - January 9 - February 21;

2015 Karin Giusti / Michael Kukla - September 26 - December 13; Story of a Story - June 13 - July 26; Art Ready: Selected Work from the Artist Mentorship - May 20–24; Erica Bailey / Yumi Janiaro Roth & Nadine Wasserman - March 14 - April 19; RESPOND - January 17 - February 22

2014 Selin Balci / Tracey Goodman / Alison Owen - December 22 - January 4; Saya Woolfalk / Vandana Jain - September 27- November 9; FOODshed: Art and Agriculture in Action - June 7 - July 27; In Plain Sight - March 15 - April 20; Robert Hickman / Mónika Sziládi - January 18 - March 2

2013 Andrea Loefke / LoVid - November 23 - January 5, 2014; Shana Moulton / Bryan Zanisnik - September 28 - November 3; Art Ready: Selected Work from the Artist Mentorship - May 22 -June 16; The Hollow Center - March 9 April 21; Janet Biggs / Aude Moreau - January 12 - February 24

2012 Adriane Colburn / Cheryl Molnar - September 29 - Nov 4; Art Ready: Selected Work from the Artist Mentorship - June 6 - July 15; Yoko Inoue / Jeanne Quinn - March 17 - April 22; Tamara Gayer / Stephen Sollins / Heeseop Yoon - January 21 - March 4

2011 Rachel Beach / Isidro Blasco - September 24 - October 30; Heat Island - June 18 - July 31; David Henderson / Shannon Plumb - March 5 - April 10; SITE 92 : Work Permit Approved - January 15 - February 20

2010 eteam / Charlotte Schulz - September 25 - November 21; Condensations of the Social - June 19 - August 1; Pawel Wojtasik / Marietta Hoferer - March 6 - April 11; John von Bergen / Michelle Weinstein - January 16 - February 21

2009 Tracey Snelling / Michael Britto - November 21 to January 3; Ellen Driscoll / Fernando Souto - September 26 to November 8; Beauty Underfoot - June 20 to August 2; Blane De St. Croix / Carlos Motta - March 7 to April 12; Kirsten Hassenfeld / Jennie C. Jones - January 17 to February 22

2008 Wayne Hodge / Joanna Malinowska / Jessica Ann Peavy - November 22 to January 4; Sarah Kabot / Shin Il Kim / Kwabena Slaughter - September 27 to November 9; There is No Synonym for Hope - June 14 to July 27; Jennifer Dalton / Rita MacDonald / Amanda C. Mathis - March 8 to April 20; Site 92: Phase II - January 12 to February 24

2007 What is the Artworld Thinking - January 2007 to February 2008; Infinitu et Contini: Repeated Histories, Reinvented Resistance -November 17 to December 30; Peter Dudek / Elana Herzog - September 29 to November 11; Emerging Artists - June 9 to July 22; Ledelle Moe / Letitia Quesenberry - March 24 to April 29; Re-Generation - January 27 to March 11

2006 Legal Aliens - December 2 to January 14, 2007; Mary Temple / Liza McConnell - September 30 to November 12; I Can't Quite Place It... - June 3 to July 16; Mind the Gap - March 18 to April 30; Site 92 - January 21 to March 5

2005 Multiplex 2 - October 14 to November 27; T-Zone - June 4 to July 17; Fifteen Paces - April 2 to May 15; On the Subject of War - February 12 to March 27; Between Interconnectedness - December 4 to January 16

2004 9 x Smack Mellon, 2004 Studio Artists - October 15 to November 14; Sunrise Sunset - June 5 to June 27; Ricoh Gerbl / Robert Taplin - March 20 to May 2; Multiplex - January 24 to March 7

2003 Big Cry Baby - November 8 to December 14; Landslide - September 13 to October 26; Outpost - June 14 to July 20; Custom Fit - April 19 to June 1; Raw - March 1 to April 6

2002 One Hand Clapping - November 30 to December 29; The Omega Manual - October 18 to November 30; Sacred Matter - September 7 to October 6; Hash Brown Potatoes - June 15 to July 21; Flay, Splay, Play - June 7 to July 12; Rendez Vous - April 26 to June 26; Eyestalk - March 9 to April 14

2001 Peppermint - December 1 to January 13; Mir2 - October 18 to November 18; Barnstormers - August 8 to September 23; Popular Mechanics - May 31 to July 8; Simon Lee / Claire Lesteven - April 7 to May 13

2000 Significant Pursuits - November 18 to December 17; Trajectories - September 28 to November 5; White Hot - July 13 to August 20; The Skin Game - April 8 to May 21

1999 Natural Histories - September 25 to November 7; Red Square - May 1 to June 25

1998 Lost and Found - March 20 to May 22; Chiaroscuro - September 12 to October 25; Just Ripe - November 7 to December 20

== Artist Studio Program ==
The Artist Studio Program at Smack Mellon provides urgently needed studio space and career building opportunities to artists wishing to live and work in New York City. As rents continue to increase astronomically throughout the City, it is increasingly difficult, if not virtually impossible for artists to find affordable, appropriate studio space. In response to the studio crisis faced by artists in New York City, Smack Mellon's Studio Program provides much needed workspace, and financial and technical support to aid artists in the creation of new work. Smack Mellon receives over 600 applications for six available studios each year. Expenses, including museum admissions, transportation and food, are paid during the program.

== Education ==
Smack Mellon’s arts education initiative, Art Ready engages young people in a way no other arts education program does, it pairs students directly with working artists; the students learn first hand over the course of a school year what it is to be an artist in the artist’s studio. The program operates during the school year and includes a series of studio visits with emerging and established artists; a series of field trips to museums and galleries; 2-3 art workshops; and a four-month arts mentorship. Art Ready connects up to twenty high school students with ten diverse artists, to gain practical experience working with professionals in a variety of artistic disciplines. The program is free for students. Working as mentors, the artists provide professional and creative guidance as the students make decisions about their futures in the arts. Mentor/teaching artists also tutor the students in their creative process, introduce them to new ways of working, and engage them in continuous critical reflection. Art Ready truly prepares high school aged students for artistic careers and gives them practical experience working in a diversity of artistic disciplines.
