= Mari Spirito =

American curator

- Education: Massachusetts College of Art and Design
- Occupation: Curator
- Known for: Founding director of Protocinema
- Website: protocinema.org

Mari Spirito is an American curator based in Istanbul and New York City. She is the founding director of Protocinema, a non-profit arts organization that presents site-aware exhibitions internationally, including in Istanbul, New York, Tbilisi, Paris, Seoul, New Delhi, Moscow, Basel, and Lima.

== Career ==
Spirito received her BFA from the Massachusetts College of Art and Design. Early in her career, she co-founded a gallery in New York and worked at 303 Gallery, where she was a director from 2000 to 2012.

In 2011, she established Protocinema, which presents contemporary art in diverse, often unconventional spaces. The organization's exhibitions aim to foster cross-cultural dialogue and contextual sensitivity.

The name 'Protocinema' was inspired by a concept from Werner Herzog's documentary Cave of Forgotten Dreams regarding early human efforts to depict motion through art. According to Spirito, Protocinema engages with questions of representation, communication, and perception.

Spirito has curated and advised on various international art programs. In 2012, she was an advisor to the second Mardin Biennial in Turkey. In 2014, she guest-curated for Artspace Sydney, focusing on contemporary Turkish art.

From 2014 to 2018, Spirito programmed Art Basel's 'Conversations' in Basel and Miami Beach, a series of panel discussions featuring artists, curators, and cultural figures.

She served as director of Alt Art Space in Istanbul from 2015 to 2017, curating exhibitions and public programs including the Turkish premiere of Rodney Graham and a group exhibition featuring Aykan Safoğlu, Hasan Özgür Top, and Hera Büyüktaşçıyan.

Spirito launched Protocinema’s Emerging Curator Series in 2015, hosting year-long exhibitions and mentorship programs at 5533 in Istanbul.

She was part of the International Advisory Committee for the inaugural High Line Plinth Commissions in New York in 2017.

Spirito has served as an associate curator for the Onassis Cultural Center, where she curated Nature of Justice (2018), a visual arts response to Aristophanes’ play The Birds, co-produced with St. Ann's Warehouse.

She has participated in curatorial training and research programs, including ICI’s Curatorial Intensive in Bangkok and was awarded the 2012 SAHA Research Award for the project Ancient Works / Asar-ı Atika.

Spirito served as a jury member for the 2018 Beirut Art Residency and curated Under (2018), a public commission by Hale Tenger launched during Dubai Art Week.

She is Vice President of the Board at Participant Gallery in New York, serves on the advisory board of Collectorspace in Istanbul, and was a former board member of the New Art Dealers Alliance.
