= Janaina Tschäpe =

Brazilian German artist living in New York

- Born: 1973 (age 52–53)

Janaina Tschäpe (born Munich, Germany, 1973) is a Brazilian/German artist.

== Biography ==
Janaina Tschäpe was born in 1973 in Munich, Germany, and was raised in São Paulo, Brazil. She received her Bachelor in Fine Arts from the Hochschule für Bildende Kueste, Hamburg in 1997 and her Master in Fine Arts from the School of Visual Arts in 1998. Tschäpe’s interdisciplinary practice spans painting, drawing, photography, video and sculpture. Incorporating elements of aquatic, plant, and human life, Tschäpe’s universe of sublime forms shift between representation, fantasy and abstraction.

The artist lives and works in New York since 1997.

Her work is in the Guggenheim Museum, New York, the Mudam, Luxembourg, the National Museum of Women in the Arts and the Taguchi Fine Art Collection, Japan.

== Bibliography ==
- ARANTES, Priscila; BARROS, Lenora; LESCHER, Artur. Enciclopédia Temporada de Projetos: 1997–2009. São Paulo: Paço das Artes, 2010.
- Art Now! Vol. 4, Hans Werner Holzwarth (editor), Cologne: Taschen, 2013
