= Liars and Prayers =

Studio album by Thalia Zedek
- Released: April 22, 2008
- Recorded: December 2007 and January 2008
- Studio: Mad Oak Studios, Allston, MA; Translator Audio, Brooklyn, NY
- Genre: Alternative rock, Blues rock, Indie rock
- Length: 57:10
- Label: Thrill Jockey; Low Transit Industries (Australia)
- Producer: Thalia Zedek; Andrew Schneider

Thalia Zedek chronology
Trust Not Those in Whom Without Some Touch of Madness (2004)	Liars and Prayers (2008)	Via (2013)

Professional ratings
Review scores
Source	Rating
Allmusic	4/5 stars
Pitchfork	7.8/10 stars
PopMatters	Positive
All About Jazz	2.5/5 stars
Cokemachineglow	Positive
Spin	3/5 stars
Exclaim!	Positive
Metro	Positive
The Washington Post	Positive
The Phill(er)	Positive

Liars and Prayers is Thalia Zedek's fourth solo album, released four years after Trust Not Those in Whom Without Some Touch of Madness.

== Background ==
Recorded between December 2007 and January 2008 at Mad Oak Studios, in Allston, MA, and Translator Audio, in Brooklyn, NY, and released on April 22, 2008, by Thrill Jockey) Records, Liars and Prayers is Thalia Zedek’s fourth solo album. The first one to be released under the name Thalia Zedek Band, Liars and Prayers was co-produced by the members of the band and record producer Andrew Schneider (Cave In, Unsane, Daughters). Further recording was undertaken by Jane Pipiki at WGBH Studios and the album was ultimately mastered by Roger Seibel. The Brooklyn Paper reported that, after the release of Trust Not Those in Whom Without Some Touch of Madness and the touring of Europe and Australia that ensued, Zedek believed she and her band "had taken the viola, drums, guitar thing as fas as [they] could." Upon her return to Boston, then, she invited bassist Winston Braman (Shepherdess) and pianist Mel Lederman (Victory at Sea) to join her as she prepared material for her following album. Both Braman and Coughlin had played bass and drums, respectively, in Zedek's previous band Come’s final record Gently, Down the Stream, after the departure of the original rhythm section consisting of Sean O’Brien and Arthur Johnson. Meanwhile, Lederman had already contributed piano to several tracks in Zedek's first and third solo records, namely, Been Here and Gone and Trust Not Those in Whom Without Some Touch of Madness.

“Body Memory" was written in remembrance of Lisa King, a "pioneering punk spoken-work artist/activist [who] died in February 2006."

In Australia, the album was released by Low Transit Industries.

== Track listing ==
All songs by Thalia Zedek. All arrangements by Zedek, Winston Braman, Daniel Coughlin, David Michael Curry, and Mel Lederman.

No.	Title	Writer(s)	Length
1.	"Next Exit"	Thalia Zedek	7:12
2.	"lower allston"	Thalia Zedek	4:37
3.	"Do You Remember"	Thalia Zedek	5:46
4.	"We Don't Go"	Thalia Zedek	4:11
5.	"Body Memory"	Thalia Zedek	6:43
6.	"Begin to Exhume"	Thalia Zedek	4:30
7.	"Stars"	Thalia Zedek	4:55
8.	"Wind"	Thalia Zedek	4:49
9.	"circa the end"	Thalia Zedek	5:03
10.	"Come Undone"	Thalia Zedek	3:42
11.	"Green and Blue"	Thalia Zedek	5:49

== Personnel ==
Thalia Zedek Band

- Thalia Zedek – guitars; vocals
- David Michael Curry – viola, trumpet, vocals
- Mel Lederman – piano
- Winston Braman – bass
- Daniel Coughlin – drums, percussion

Additional personnel

- Dan Zedek – Cover design
- Rosa Zedek – Assistant art director
- Jacob Zedek – Assistant art director
- David Michael Curry – Front cover photo
- Heather Kapplow – Back cover photo
- Thalia Zedek Band – Production
- Andrew Schneider – Production, Engineering, Mixing
- Jane Pipiki – Recorded the grand piano on tracks 1, 3, 6, 9–10
- Roger Seibel – Mastering

== Critical reception ==
On Metacritic, the album has a weighted average score of 81 out of 100, based on 5 critics, indicating "universal acclaim". Reviewing Liars and Prayers for PopMatters, Jennifer Kelly characterised the album as Zedek's "most cathartic, powerful solo album yet," going as far as labelling it "one of the year's most intense and fiercely passionate albums." In his review of the album for The Phill(er), novelist Doug Cowie describes it as "an hour of melodic, rocking, aching music that wears its country, blues and punk hats in a surprisingly complicated and layered way […] and it's played by a terrific band." Meanwhile, in her review for AllMusic, Heather Phares remarks that "Liars and Prayers’ only flaw may be that its unflagging intensity is almost overwhelming, given that the album is nearly an hour long, but it's still some of Zedek's most thoughtful and full-bodied work." Vish Khanna, writing for Exclaim!, praised the album as "a ruminative response to living in America under the Bush Administration," going on to describe the Thalia Zedek Band as Zedek's "own latter-day Patti Smith Group," before drawing the distinction that, "while reserved rage is employed instead of a frenetic punk zeal, there’s a similar belief in the revolutionary power of language." In Joe Gross’ positive review of the album for Spin, he asserts that "[m]elodrama is Zedek’s natural state, and augmenting her touring crew of drums and viola with bass and piano fills out the lyrical paranoia — guitar rushes and soaring riffs speak louder than words." The Brooklyn Paper claims "the whole record is a bit of a perfect storm".
