= Eve (Thalia Zedek album) =

Studio album by Thalia Zedek
- Released: August 19, 2016
- Recorded: Fall 2015
- Studio: Kimchee Records, Cambridge, MA
- Genre: Alternative rock, Blues rock, Indie rock
- Length: 47:07
- Label: Thrill Jockey
- Producer: Andy Hong

Thalia Zedek chronology
Six (2014)	Eve (2016)	Fighting Season (2018)

Professional ratings
Review scores
Source	Rating
The Boston Globe	Positive
The Quietus	Positive
Blurt	4/5 stars
The Skinny	3/5 stars
Mojo	8/10 stars
Financial Times	4/5 stars
Q	8/10 stars

Eve is Thalia Zedek's sixth solo album, released three years after Via.

== Background ==
Released by Thrill Jockey on August 19, 2016, three years after her previous solo album Via, Eve was recorded in the Fall of 2015 at Kimchee Studios, in Cambridge, MA. Zedek's third solo album to be credited to the Thalia Zedek Band, Eve was engineered and mixed by Andy Hong, while Andy Guthrie recorded the percussion on three songs, namely, "Afloat", "You Will Wake", and "Northwest Branch". Eve was mastered by Heba Kadry at Timeless Mastering in November 2015.

The process of writing the songs for Eve was different from that of Zedek's previous records, as the band "recorded a fair amount of songs that [they] hadn't played live before [they] recorded them." She reflected that "[w]hen you're writing in the studio, it lends a different, more reflective feel to the music."

Zedek has characterised Eve as "darker than [her] last few albums," listing globalisation, economic instability, the internet, and global warming as some of the reasons why her songwriting has taken an even more sombre turn. The title of the album refers to the anxiety regarding being at the brink of change. As Zedek puts it, "I feel like we are on the eve of something momentous. It may be the eve of a new era, or the eve of destruction, I don't know."

Eve was Zedek's first album to feature Jonathan Ulman—who also contributed to her 2014 EP Six—on drums.

Hilken Mancini (Fuzzy, Shepherdess) contributed back-up vocals for "Afloat", the album's opening song.

== Track listing ==
All songs and lyrics by Thalia Zedek.

No.	Title	Writer(s)	Length
1.	"Afloat"	Thalia Zedek	6:47
2.	"360°"	Thalia Zedek	3:24
3.	"By the Hand"	Thalia Zedek	4:37
4.	"Illumination"	Thalia Zedek	4:19
5.	"You Will Wake"	Thalia Zedek	4:47
6.	"Northwest Branch"	Thalia Zedek	6:06
7.	"Not Farewell"	Thalia Zedek	7:36
8.	"Walking in Time"	Thalia Zedek	6:11
9.	"All I Need"	Thalia Zedek	3:20

== Personnel ==
Thalia Zedek Band

- Thalia Zedek – vocals, acoustic guitars, electric guitars
- David Michael Curry – viola
- Mel Lederman – piano
- Jonathan Ulman – drums, percussion
- Winston Braman – bass

Additional musicians

- Hilken Mancini – back-up vocals on "Afloat"

Additional personnel

- Andy Hong – engineering and mixing
- Andy Guthrie – recording of percussion on "Afloat", "You Will Wake", and "Northwest Branch"
- Heba Kadry – mastering
- Dan Zedek – design
- Krisa – front and inside cover photos

== Critical reception ==
On Metacritic, the album has a weighted average score of 81 out of 100, based on 10 critics, indicating "universal acclaim". In his review for The Quietus, Neil Kulkarni stated that Eve includes "some of the best songs [Zedek has] ever written," going on to claim that she always manages "to map out a territory in songwriting that's almost entirely her own." In his four-star review of the album for Blurt, John Schacht describes the material in Eve as "extended, slow-burn songs [...] that evolve from quiet viola and/or piano-accented meditations into emotionally cathartic maelstroms built mostly around [Zedek's] biting guitar." Ludovic Hunter-Tinley, in his praising, four-star review of Eve for The Financial Times, called it "a tribute to uncompromising artistic survival." In his review for The Skinny, Gary Kaill called Eve "a collection of upfront confessionals that fuses guitar, bass and drums into a hellfire brew," going on to laud Zedek, stating that "there are few artists whose commitment to performance is so absolute and fearless."
