= 11:11 (Come album) =

Studio album by Come
- Released: December 1, 1992
- Recorded: July 1992
- Genres: Alternative rock; punk blues; noise rock; slowcore
- Length: 52:30
- Labels: Matador; Placebo; Sub Pop
- Producers: Come; Tim O'Heir; Carl Plaster

Come chronology
11:11 (1992)	Don't Ask, Don't Tell (1994)

Singles from 11:11
- 1. "Fast Piss Blues" Released: November 20, 1992

11:11 is the debut album by Boston indie rock band Come.

== Background ==
After their 7" single "Car" was released as part of Sub Pop's Singles Club subscription series, "Come started getting raves in the press, [and] played to wildly enthusiastic crowds in London and Amsterdam" before recording their debut album 11:11, which was recorded and mixed in just seven-and-a-half days. Recorded in July 1992 at Fort Apache Studios in Cambridge, MA, 11:11 was produced by Come with Tim O'Heir and Carl Plaster. The album takes its title from the numerological phenomenon involving the recurrence and potential synchronicity of the time 11:11. The members of the band "decided on the title after glancing at a digital clock on several occasions and finding it was 11:11 each time." As Brokaw puts it, "[i]t was a recurring phenomena [...] It became a sort of superstitious mantra."

The band recorded a music video for the album's opening track, "Submerge", directed by Jesse Peretz, in addition to which their song "Dead Molly" was included in Allison Anders and Kurt Voss's 1999 independent comedy Sugar Town.

The song "Fast Piss Blues" was released as a single, featuring a cover of Mick Jagger and Keith Richards's "I Got The Blues", from The Rolling Stones' 1971 album Sticky Fingers, as its B-side. Both songs were included in the CD version of 11:11, but did not feature in the LP version.

== Critical reception ==
Professional ratings
Review scores
Source	Rating
AllMusic	3.5/5 stars
Consequence of Sound	C+
The Encyclopedia of Popular Music	4/5 stars
Entertainment Weekly	A−
MusicHound Rock	4/5 stars
Mojo	4/5 stars
Paste	8.7/10
PopMatters	8/10
The Village Voice	C+

In a contemporary review for The Village Voice, music critic Robert Christgau said that the music comprises flat melodies with some slide guitar and lyrics that range from "unintelligible to incomprehensible". Entertainment Weekly described 11:11 as "a captivating blast of ennui and feedback that may be Matador's finest moment yet", going on to characterize it as "enthralling, like watching someone howl into a rainstorm," whilst The Virgin Encyclopedia of Nineties Music states that it was "rightly lauded as one of 1992's finest releases." Trouser Press stated that 11:11 is "very much a guitar tour de force, drenched as it is in the sweaty fluids that come forth when the six-strings of Zedek (a veteran of Boston's Dangerous Birds and New York's Live Skull) and Chris Brokaw (who served concurrently as Codeine's drummer until 1993) rub against each other."

AllMusic referred to 11:11 as "a uniquely sludgy, electric, and strong fusion of sounds and styles, combining extreme angst and commanding power." Rolling Stone called 11:11 "one of Matador's defining records," whilst The Rough Guide to Rock summarizes 11:11 as follows: "The music and moods teeter precariously, erupting into violent explosions with little warning."

== Re-issue ==
In January 2013, Matador Records announced that a special 20th anniversary 2 LP/CD re-issue of 11:11 would be released in May 2013. The re-issue includes the original release, in addition to a live album consisting of the band's performance at the 1992 Vermonstress Festival. Announcing the news, Pitchfork described 11:11 as "one of the more elusive gems of Matador's back catalog."

The vinyl LP version of the record was pressed by United Record Pressing in Nashville, TN.

== Cover versions ==
No Safety covered 11:11's opening track, "Submerge" in their 1994 album Live at the Knitting Factory, whilst Australian alternative rock band Screamfeeder covered "Off To One Side" in their 1999 album Home Age, a cover which was later included in their 2011 rarities compilation Cargo Embargo (B Sides & More). The Spanish band Mourn covered the song "William" on their 2019 release Mixtape.

== Track listing ==
No.	Title	Writer(s)	Length
1.	"Submerge"	Come	4:24
2.	"Dead Molly"	Come	4:08
3.	"Brand New Vein"	Come	6:13
4.	"Off to One Side"	Come	5:47
5.	"Bell"	Come	3:25
6.	"William"	Come	4:34
7.	"Sad Eyes"	Come	4:03
8.	"Power Failure"	Come	5:44
9.	"Orbit"	Come	5.04

CD Bonus Tracks
No.	Title	Writer(s)	Length
10.	"Fast Piss Blues" (Bonus track on CD version)	Come	3:57
11.	"I Got the Blues" (Bonus track on CD version – The Rolling Stones cover)	Jagger/Richards	5:04

Anniversary Edition Reissue – Live at Vermonstress Festival, Burlington, VT
No.	Title	Writer(s)	Length
1.	"Dead Molly"	Come
2.	"William"	Come
3.	"Submerge"	Come
4.	"Last Mistake"	Come
5.	"Fast Piss Blues"	Come
6.	"Bell"	Come
7.	"Car"	Come
8.	"SVK"	Come

== Personnel ==
- Thalia Zedek – vocals, guitar
- Chris Brokaw – guitar, vocals
- Sean O'Brien – bass
- Arthur Johnson – drums

with

- Carl Plaster – piano on "Brand New Vein", organ on "Sad Eyes", floor tom on "Power Failure"
- Bob Hamilton – art direction
- Roderigo Avila – cover art
