= Trust Not Those in Whom Without Some Touch of Madness =

Studio album by Thalia Zedek
- Released: September 14, 2004
- Recorded: February–March 2004
- Studio: Hotel2Tango, Montreal
- Genre: Alternative rock, Blues rock, Indie rock
- Length: 55:38
- Label: Thrill Jockey; Acuarela Records (Spain)
- Producer: Howard Bilerman

Thalia Zedek chronology
Hell is in Hello (2004)	Trust Not Those in Whom Without Some Touch of Madness (2004)	Liars and Prayers (2008)

Professional ratings
Review scores
Source	Rating
Allmusic	3.5/5 stars
Pitchfork	7.8/10 stars
Tiny Mix Tapes	5/5 stars
Neumu	6/10 stars
Stylus Magazine	B+
Uncut	1/5 stars
Out	Positive
The Advocate	Positive
The Washington Post	Positive
The Times	Positive

Trust Not Those in Whom Without Some Touch of Madness is Thalia Zedek's third solo album, released under two months after Hell is in Hello.

== Background ==
In 2002, after Matador Records—which had released Zedek's debut solo album— was bought by Beggars Banquet, Zedek was dropped from Matador's roster. Therefore, Trust Not Those in Whom Without Some Touch of Madness was released in 2004 by Thrill Jockey (and Acuarela Records in Spain), which began the long-lasting and fruitful relationship between Zedek and Thrill Jockey. The album was recorded, engineered, and mixed by producer and one-time Arcade Fire drummer Howard Bilerman, who co-owns the Hotel2Tango recording studio at which it was recorded. The recording of Trust Not Those in Whom Without Some Touch of Madness took place in February and March 2004.

Guest musician included Jonah Sacks and Harris Newman. Sacks (Dresden Dolls, Willard Grant Conspiracy) "drove up from New York [to Montreal] on a day’s notice" to contribute cello to "Bone," whilst Newman (Mudfish, Sackville) added lap steel guitar to "Evil Hand".

Whereas her prior solo releases had included many covers—Leonard Cohen, Luiz Bonfa, and V; in 2001's Been Here and Gone, The Velvet Underground and Bob Dylan in 2003's You’re a Big Girl Now EP, not to mention the self-released Live at Tonic, NYC January 16, 2000 which consisted entirely of covers— Trust Not Those in Whom Without Some Touch of Madness was composed wholly of original material. The album's eleven songs were recorded in eleven days employing completely analog techniques, forgoing any use of Pro Tools or computers. Its title came from a scrambled Chinese fortune cookie Zedek got at a New York City restaurant in the late eighties; the "fortune had actually been cut in half horizontally, and the Scotch-taped back together with the bottom half of another fortune." Zedek held on to the fortune for many years and, eventually, decided to repurpose it as the title to her second solo album.

Trust Not Those in Whom Without Some Touch of Madness was mastered at Peerless Mastering in Boston, MA, by Roger Seibel, and was pressed at Disque Americ.

The album is dedicated to the memory of the late Laura Carter, Bar-B-Q Killers’ vocalist and guitarist, friend and former girlfriend of Zedek's. Carter died on December 2, 2002.

== Track listing ==
All songs by Thalia Zedek. All arrangements by Zedek, David Michael Curry, and Daniel Coughlin.

No.	Title	Writer(s)	Length
1.	"Ship"	Thalia Zedek	6:14
2.	"Sailor"	Thalia Zedek	4:57
3.	"Evil Hand"	Thalia Zedek	4:26
4.	"Since Then"	Thalia Zedek	4:37
5.	"Angels"	Thalia Zedek	5:01
6.	"Bus Stop"	Thalia Zedek	5:56
7.	"Brother"	Thalia Zedek	4:49
8.	"Bone"	Thalia Zedek	4:34
9.	"Island Song"	Thalia Zedek	3:58
10.	"Virginia"	Thalia Zedek	4:27
11.	"Hell is in Hello"	Thalia Zedek	6:40

== Personnel ==
- Thalia Zedek – vocals; guitars
- David Michael Curry – viola, trumpet, loops
- Daniel Coughlin – drums

Additional musicians

- Mel Lederman – piano on tracks 1, 3–6, 9–10
- Jonah Sacks – cello on track 8
- Harris Newman – lap steel guitar on track 3

Additional personnel

- Howard Bilerman – Producer, Engineer, Mixing
- Roger Seibel – Audio mastering
- Sheila Sachs – Design
- Lana Z Caplan – Photography
- David M. Curry – Photography
- Heather Kapplow – Photography

== Critical reception ==
On Metacritic, the album has a weighted average score of 78 out of 100, based on 11 critics, indicating "generally favourable reviews". In his review for AllMusic, Johnny Loftus remarked that "[t]hroughout this record as it's been since the old days, Zedek never fails to put her very soul into each syllable, and her commitment is matched by the instrumentation," whilst Mike Joyce, writing for The Washington Post, described it as "somber, poetic and sometimes unnerving, […] cutting and dissonant" In his praising review for Pitchfork, Matthew Murphy remarked that, "[t]hough the musicians occasionally make overt references to traditional blues, C&W, or Appalachian folk, the proceedings here generally breathe in the same nebulous, turbulent atmosphere that has fueled groups like the Bad Seeds or The Dirty Three." Tiny Mix Tapes’s review of the album stated that "[w]hat surprises [...] most about Trust Not in Those… is the willingness on Thalia's behalf not to retread much of her past work," whilst also praising "the strength of the actual songwriting" In his positive review of Trust Not Those in Whom Without Some Touch of Madness for Out, Matthew Breen characterised it as "truly challenging, beautiful, dark music inspiring something akin to desperation", while, opening his complimentary review the album for Neumu, Anthony Carew stated that "Thalia Zedek should be so well acclaimed by now that she's reached some sort of venerable status."
