= Perfect Vision =

Studio album by Thalia Zedek
- Released: August 27, 2021
- Recorded: Late 2020 to January 6, 2021
- Studio: Machines with Magnets, Pawtucket, Rhode Island
- Genre: Alternative rock, Blues rock, Indie rock
- Length: 46:21
- Label: Thrill Jockey
- Producer: Seth Manchester

Thalia Zedek chronology
Fighting Season (2018)	Perfect Vision (2021)

Perfect Vision is the eighth solo album by Thalia Zedek, released on August 27, 2021, three years after Fighting Season.

== Background ==
Released by Thrill Jockey on August 27, 2021, three years after her previous solo album Fighting Season, Perfect Vision was recorded in late 2020 to early 2021 at Machines with Magnets, in Pawtucket, Rhode Island. Zedek's fifth solo album to be credited to the Thalia Zedek Band, Perfect Vision was recorded and mixed by producer Seth Manchester and mastered by Sarah Register.

Whilst the material in Zedek's previous album Fighting Season "was written leading up to and following the 2016 U.S. elections", which contributed to the political themes of many of its songs, Zedek and Manchester finished working on Perfect Vision on January 6, 2021, as the United States Capitol in Washington, D.C. was being violently attacked by a mob of supporters of President Donald Trump, resulting again in an album that is at points not only overtly political but one that, as Jared Dix reviewing it for Echoes and Dust states, "may even be angrier than the last album, Fighting Season".

"Tolls" features fellow Thrill Jockey artist Alison Chesley, also known as Helen Money, on cello and piano.

== Critical reception ==
Professional ratings
Aggregate scores
Source	Rating
Metacritic	71/100
Review scores
Source	Rating
AllMusic	3.5/5 stars
Dusted Magazine	Positive
Echoes and Dust	Positive
Mojo	3/5 stars
Spectrum Culture	71%
Uncut	7/10

On Metacritic, the album has a weighted average score of 71 out of 100, based on four critics, indicating "generally favorable reviews".

Jennifer Kelly, in her review of the album for Dusted magazine, declared that Perfect Vision, "[l]ike all [of Zedek's] works, [...] exudes a brute, persistent strength that will not yield, no matter what happens". Kelly then went on to state that "[the] album presents an artist who has had all the time life affords to figure out how she wants to sound and all the support that long-time collaborators can bring to realizing her ideas. Every sound fits, without sounding in the least bit fussed over or premeditated." AllMusic's review of the album, penned by Mark Deming, suggested that "[e]ven more than Fighting Season, Perfect Vision is art that offers a hard but honest look at the world and the times that gave it life, and its evocative power will still speak clearly long after other crises have replaced those keeping Zedek awake in 2021."

== Track listing ==
All tracks are written by Thalia Zedek.

No.	Title	Length
1.	"Cranes"	4:41
2.	"Smoked"	5:08
3.	"Binoculars"	5:19
4.	"Overblown"	4:10
5.	"Queasy"	3:56
6.	"From the Fire"	3:22
7.	"The Plan"	5:20
8.	"Revelation Time"	4:45
9.	"Remain"	3:47
10.	"Tolls"	5:51

== Personnel ==
Thalia Zedek Band

- Thalia Zedek – electric guitars, vocals
- Winston Braman – bass guitar
- David Michael Curry – viola
- Gavin McCarthy – drums

Additional musicians

- Mel Lederman – piano on "Binoculars"
- Brian Carpenter – trumpet on "From the Fire"
- Karen Sarkisian – pedal steel guitar on "Cranes"
- Alison Chesley – cello and piano on "Smoked" and "Tolls"

Production

- Thalia Zedek – front cover photo
- Heather Kapplow – back cover photo
- Dan Zedek – design
- Seth Manchester – recording and mixing
- Sarah Register – mastering
