= Been Here and Gone =

Studio album by Thalia Zedek
- Released: July 31, 2001
- Recorded: March 2001
- Studio: Higher Power Recording
- Genre: Alternative rock, Blues rock, Indie rock
- Label: Matador; P-Vine Records (Japan)
- Producer: Bryce Goggin; Thalia Zedek

Thalia Zedek chronology
Been Here and Gone (2001)	Hell is in Hello (2004)

Professional ratings
Review scores
Source	Rating
Allmusic	4/5 stars
Pitchfork	8.5/10 stars
Spin	8/10 stars
Out	Positive
The Guardian	3/5 stars
The A.V. Club	Positive
CMJ New Music Monthly	Positive
Exclaim!	Positive

Been Here and Gone is Thalia Zedek's debut solo album, following the demise of Come, her previous band.

== Background ==
Released in 2001 by Matador and P-Vine Records, the album was produced by Bryce Goggin and Thalia Zedek at Higher Power Recording, Goggin's recording studio in a de-sanctified church along the Hudson River, south of Albany, NY. The recording of the album took place in March 2001.

After the break up of Come, Zedek "wanted to play in a band where [she] could hear [her]self sing and not have to wear earplugs." She began playing solo live shows, singing in diverse styles with different collaborators, often including various covers. Eventually, she started playing with longtime associate Beth Heinberg on piano, with David Michael Curry (Empty House Cooperative, Willard Grant conspiracy, Will Oldham) soon joining them on the viola. Not long after, Daniel Coughlin got involved and became the project's drummer.

The title of the album came from an old copy of Frederic Ramsey Jr.’s Been Here and Gone (New Brunswick: Rutgers University Press, 1960) on the Southern musical landscape of spirituals, blues, and jazz, that Zedek had been gifted by a friend. The "combination of future and past and present tense" appealed to Zedek. According to Andi Rowlands, the album was "supposedly inspired by the cabaret-style shows [Zedek’s previous band] Come played between their third and fourth records," Near-Life Experience and Gently, Down the Stream. Zedek wrote the songs for the album within a year.

Been Here and Gone also includes three covers. "Dance Me to the End of Love" is a cover of the opening track to Leonard Cohen’s 1984 album Various Positions. "1926" was written by Gary Gogel and originally recorded by V; for their 1982 12" vinyl The V EP, then sang by Susan Anway. Zedek's cover is also included in the Matador at Fifteen compilation, released on 12 October 2004, to celebrate the 15th anniversary of the creation of Matador Records. The standard version of the album closes with Zedek's reinterpretation of Luiz Bonfá and Antônio Maria’s "Manhã de Carnaval" ("Carnival Morning"), the principal theme from 1959 film Orfeu Negro, singing the English adaptation of the lyrics by Carl Sigman that Frank Sinatra sang in his 1969 album My Way. Zedek began playing "Manhã de Carnaval" at Beth Heinberg's suggestion as—being a professional accompanist—Heinberg already had the sheet music. The Japanese edition of Been Here and Gone includes as a bonus track "Who Jumped In My Grave," originally recorded by Zedek's previous band Come for their 1995 10" vinyl String.

== Track listing ==
No.	Title	Writer(s)	Length
1.	"Excommunications (Everybody Knows)"	Thalia Zedek	4:19
2.	"Back to School"	Thalia Zedek	4:56
3.	"Strong"	Thalia Zedek	4:17
4.	"Temporary Guest"	Thalia Zedek	5:34
5.	"Treacherous Thing"	Thalia Zedek	4:42
6.	"Dance Me to the End of Love"	Leonard Cohen	7:12
7.	"1926"	Gary Gogel	4:32
8.	"Desanctified (Full Circle)"	Thalia Zedek	6:42
9.	"Somebody Else"	Thalia Zedek	3:27
10.	"10th Lament"	Thalia Zedek	5:13
11.	"Manha de Carnaval"	Luiz Bonfa	3:51
12.	"Who Jumped in my Grave (Japanese-only bonus track)"	Come	5:27

== Personnel ==
- Thalia Zedek – vocals; electric guitar; acoustic guitar
- Chris Brokaw – electric guitar; slide guitar; bass on track 5
- David Michael Curry – viola; trumpet on track 5
- Mel Lederman – piano on tracks 1–2, 4, 6, and 8–10; bass on track 10
- Daniel Coughlin – drums and percussion on track 8; glockenspiel on track 10
- Beth Heinberg – piano on tracks 7 & 11

Additional personnel

- Bryce Goggin – Producer, Engineer, Mixing
- Thalia Zedek – Producer
- Todd Vos – Additional Engineering
- Fred Kevorkian – Audio mastering
- Sean Griffin – Cover painting
- Lana Z Caplan – Back cover and inside photographs of Zedek and Coughlin
- Daniel Coughlin – All other photographs
- Mark Shaw – Design

== Critical reception ==
In her review of the album for Out, Tiffany Watson remarked that whilst Zedek's previous bands and releases had made her ‘a rock vet, […] Been Here and Gone should make her a legend.’ Writing for CMJ New Music Monthly, Tim Haslett called Been Here and Gone "a perfectly cast piece," drawing attention to the fact that "Zedek’s songwriting has always demonstrated an affinity for the blues, laced with a strong Southern Gothic sensibility of the William Faulkner and Carson McCullers schools." Andi Rowlands observed that Been Here and Gone seems the mature and reminiscent record of an aged career," drawing comparisons to Joni Mitchell’s Both Sides Now and Neil Young’s Harvest Moon, stating that it sounded "as if [Zedek] were singing indie rock’s torch song." In his review for AllMusic, Peter J. D’Angelo focussed on "the ability of [Zedek’s] voice to accompany the band toward quiet yet monumental buildups." Likewise, Michael Barclay, writing for Exclaim! magazine, asserts that Zedek has "discovered a greater intensity at a lower volume," drawing comparisons between her solo work and that of "Nick Cave, Edith Piaf and Marianne Faithfull."
