= Uzi (band) =

1980s alt-rock band from Boston

- Origin: Boston, Massachusetts, United States
- Genres: Alternative rock, noise rock, no wave, art punk
- Years active: 1984–1987
- Label: Homestead
- Past members: Thalia Zedek; Danny Lee; Randy Barnwell; Bob Young; Phil Milstein; Craig Federhen

Uzi was an American alternative rock band, formed in 1984 in Boston, Massachusetts and disbanded in 1987. The band featured Thalia Zedek (vocals, guitar), Danny Lee (drums), Randy Barnwell (bass guitar), Bob Young (guitar) and Phil Milstein (tape loops). Never achieving commercial success during their short period of activity, the band gained a cult following, becoming a part of Boston's underground rock scene.

== History ==
Uzi was formed by Zedek and Lee after Zedek left the all-female post-punk band Dangerous Birds in 1983. Barnwell was replaced briefly by Craig Federhen prior to Uzi's first concert.

The band released only one EP, Sleep Asylum, released by Homestead Records in 1986. The band's sound featured "gritty wall of sound guitars, tape loops, and heavy drumbeats, accompanied by Zedek's strong vocal presence," which drew comparisons to noise rock acts such as Sonic Youth and to a lesser extent, Big Black. The EP was included at No. 5 in the annual Village Voice Pazz & Jop critics poll.

Following the release of the EP, Uzi disbanded due to tensions between band members. Sleep Asylum was later reissued on compact disc in 1993 by Matador Records in the U.S. and in 1994 by Placebo in the UK

== Post-breakup and other projects ==
Before forming Uzi, Zedek was a member of White Women. She released one single with her second band, Dangerous Birds, "Alpha Romeo" (1982, Propeller). The single's Zedek-composed B-side, "Smile on Your Face", was later included on the influential Sub Pop compilation Sub Pop 100.

After Uzi's demise, Zedek joined the New York-based no wave band Live Skull in 1987, appearing on their albums Dusted (1987) and Positraction (1989) and the Snuffer EP (1988). Live Skull split up in 1990. Zedek then moved back to Boston and formed the more blues-rock-oriented Come along with former Codeine drummer Chris Brokaw., releasing four albums before they disbanded in 2001. That same year, she issued her first solo album, Been Here and Gone, since followed by two others under her name alone (Trust Not Those in Whom Without Some Touch of Madness and Hell Is in Hello, both 2004) and two as the Thalia Zedek Band (2008's Liars and Prayers and 2013's Via). Zedek also participated in the 1998 Suffragette Sessions tour.

Lee was the drummer of Boston alternative metal band El Dopa, whose sole album, United in States of Narcolepsy, was released in 1997 on Conscience Records. Lee also played drums on Marlene Tholl's 2007 album Kore, released by Small and Green Records.

Following Uzi, Barnwell and Young resurfaced with A Scanner Darkly, releasing one album, This Is The Way, in 1988 on Belgian label Sub Rosa. Later in '88, Young's solo project, Emerald Vein, released a solo album, Existence, on Sub Rosa. A second Emerald Vein album, Land of the Living (with Barnwell on bass), was issued by Sub Rosa in 1991.

Prior to Uzi, Milstein founded the Velvet Underground Appreciation Society in 1977 and edited the club's fanzine, What Goes On.

Milstein was part of the collaborative ensemble Between Meals along with Jad Fair (Half Japanese), Moe Tucker (The Velvet Underground), Andy Paley, Erik Lindgren (Birdsongs of the Mesozoic) and David Greenberger (Duplex Planet) and performed percussion, vocals and guitar on their mini-album Oh No I Just Knocked Over a Cup of Coffee, recorded in 1980 and 1982 but released in 1984 on Iridescence Records.

Milstein's first solo project, Pep Lester and His Pals, released the Jack-O-Lantern Moon EP on Iridescence in 1984, which included musical contributions from Fair, Lindgren, Greenberger, Christmas members Michael Cudahy and Liz Cox (both later of Combustible Edison), and Mission of Burma members Roger Miller and Martin Swope, and mixing on one track by Willie "Loco" Alexander. A Pep Lester double LP, The Mathematical Genius of Pep Lester, featuring over 20 guest musicians, was released by Forced Exposure in 1988.

Milstein later compiled an album, Tapeworm: SFX by Phil Milstein, consisting of a montage of the tape effects he used with Uzi, released in 1990 by Penn Jillette's 50 Skidillion Watts Records. Using the name Phil X. Milstein, he also collaborated on a live album of experimental music with Sonic Youth frontman Thurston Moore, title Songs We Taught the Lord, Vol. 2. It was recorded December 4, 1996 at the Middle East club in Cambridge and released in 1997 on Hot Cars Warp Records.

Milstein was also a member of 7 or 8 Worm Hearts, appearing on their 1989 self-released cassette All Writhe; guested on three tracks on Cul de Sac's debut album, Ecim, released in 1991 by Capella; and was a collaborator with Tom Ardolino on the "MSR Madness" series of song poem compilations.

== Band members ==
- Thalia Zedek – vocals, guitar (1984–1987)
- Danny Lee – drums (1984–1987)
- Randy Barnwell – bass guitar (1984–1987)
- Bob Young – guitar (1984–1987)
- Phil Milstein – tape loops (1984–1987)
- Craig Federhen – bass guitar (circa 1984)

== Discography ==
=== EPs ===
- Sleep Asylum (1986, Homestead Records)
