= Enli Health Intelligence =

Software company based in Oregon, US

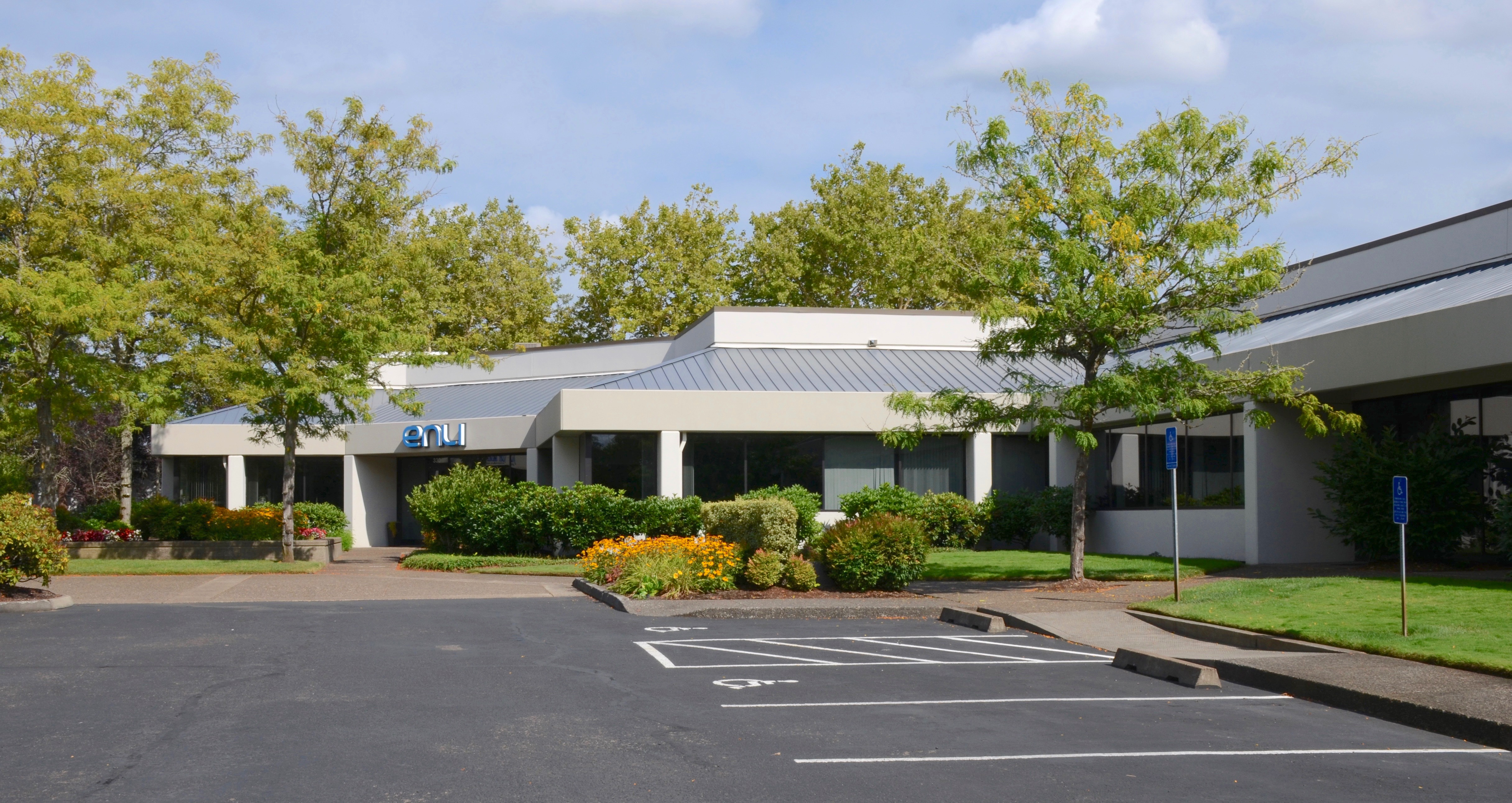
- Final headquarters in Beaverton, Oregon, pictured in 2019
- Type: Private
- Industry: Software
- Founded: 2001
- Defunct: 2021
- Fate: Acquired by Cedar Gate Technologies
- Headquarters: Beaverton, Oregon, USA; 45.531261°N 122.8481°W
- Key people: CEO, Luis Machuca
- Products: Secure messaging

Enli Health Intelligence was a privately held software company based in Beaverton, Oregon, and previously in Hillsboro, Oregon. Founded in 2001 as Kryptiq Corporation, the company specialized in electronic medical records and secure communications between physicians and patients. In 2015, the company was renamed Enli Health Intelligence.

In 2021, the company was acquired by Cedar Gate Technologies, which discontinued use of the Enli name.

== History ==
=== 2001–2003 ===
Kryptiq Corporation was founded in 2001 by Luis Machuca, Jeff Sponaugle, and Murali Karamchedu, with the company first housed in Machuca's home. Kryptiq opened its first office in Beaverton, Oregon, in October 2001 after securing $2 million in capital. Kryptiq was founded largely by former employees of Intel Corporation as well as those from eFusion looking to use their encryption experience and expertise to provide secure email for the health care field.

By September 2002, the company had grown to 15 employees and had a board of directors heavy on those with Intel ties, such as Andy Bryant. The company's original production was a subscription-based email add-on that allowed physicians to securely communicate with patients and others and data protected by HIPAA. In July 2003, the company purchased software company RosettaMed, with plans to incorporate their software into Kryptiq's existing programs. In August of that year, Kryptiq finished raising $7.9 million in venture capital from investors such as Voyager Capital and SmartForest Ventures. The company continued with acquisitions in November when it purchased MedShape LLC, allowing Kryptiq to expand into the medical records field. Kryptiq retained all six employees who had developed DocuTrak and RosettaStone. By December 2003, the company had grown to 50 employees and projected to be cash flow positive by the end of 2004.

=== 2004–2007 ===
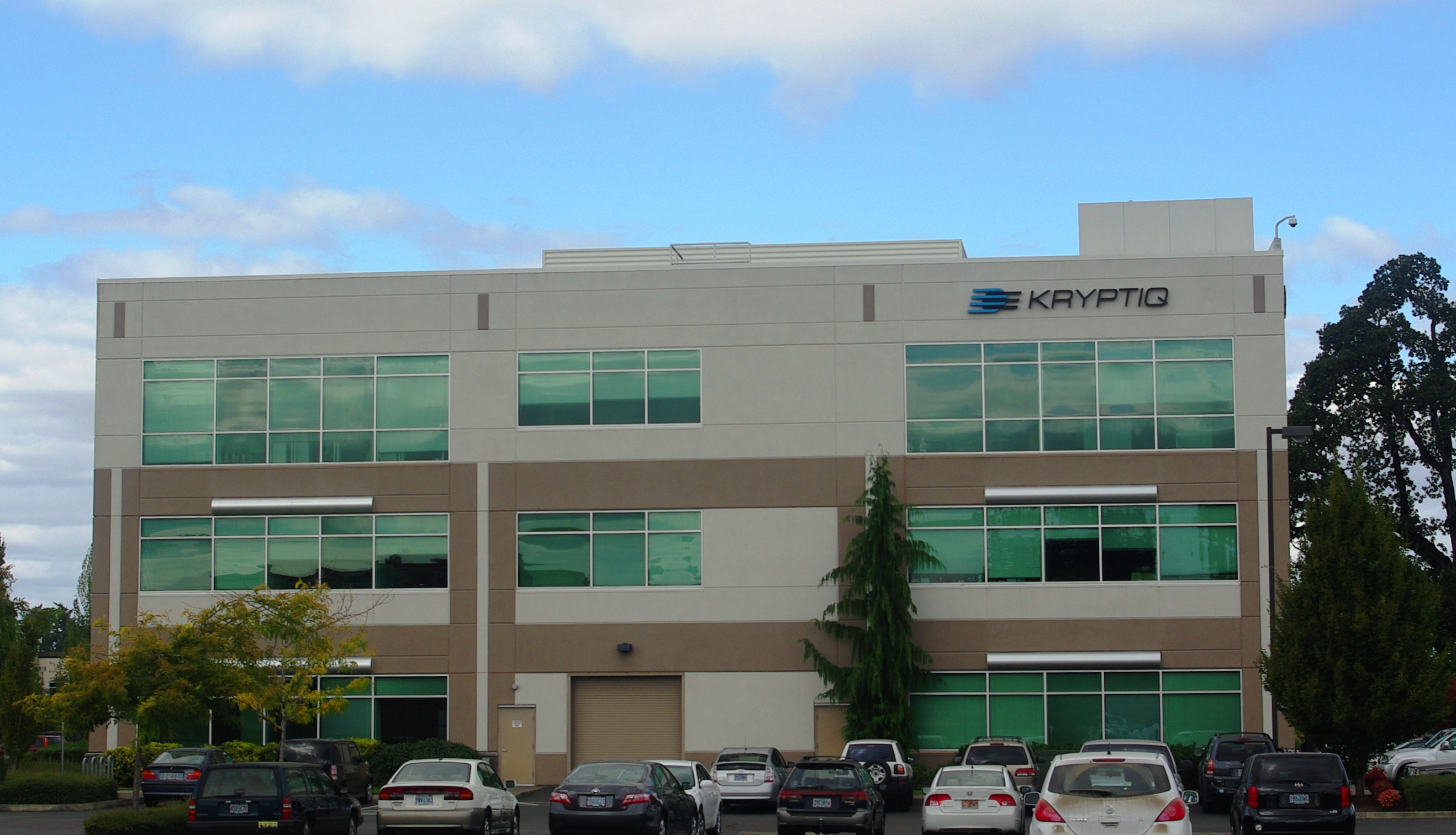
Former headquarters at the Rock Creek Corporate Center

Kryptiq launched CareManager in 2004, a disease management software program. CareManager was developed with Providence Health System, and the program was awarded the e-Health Leadership Award in 2004 by the Disease Management Association of America. Then in January 2004, Kryptiq acquired This Computer Solution Inc. in an all-stock deal. The Vancouver, Washington, company had developed software for managing contracts for health insurers. In January 2005, the company moved from Beaverton to Hillsboro and finished the prior year with 200% growth. By February of that year, Kryptiq had expanded to 60 employees, become a member of the Center for Health Transformation, and added GE Healthcare as a partner.

The company raised $7.1 million in capital in 2005, with investors including SmartForest Ventures, Voyager Capital, and Shelter Capital Partners, with the round closing in April. At the time, Kryptiq was then 65 percent owned by investors. In July 2005, the company announced they would move from the AmberGlen Business Center to a 24,000-square-foot (2,200 m^{2}) space in the Rock Creek Corporate Center along U.S. 26, both in Hillsboro. Shelter Capital Partners, SmartForest Ventures, the Oregon Investment Fund, and others invested another combined $6.6 million in Kryptiq in September 2006.

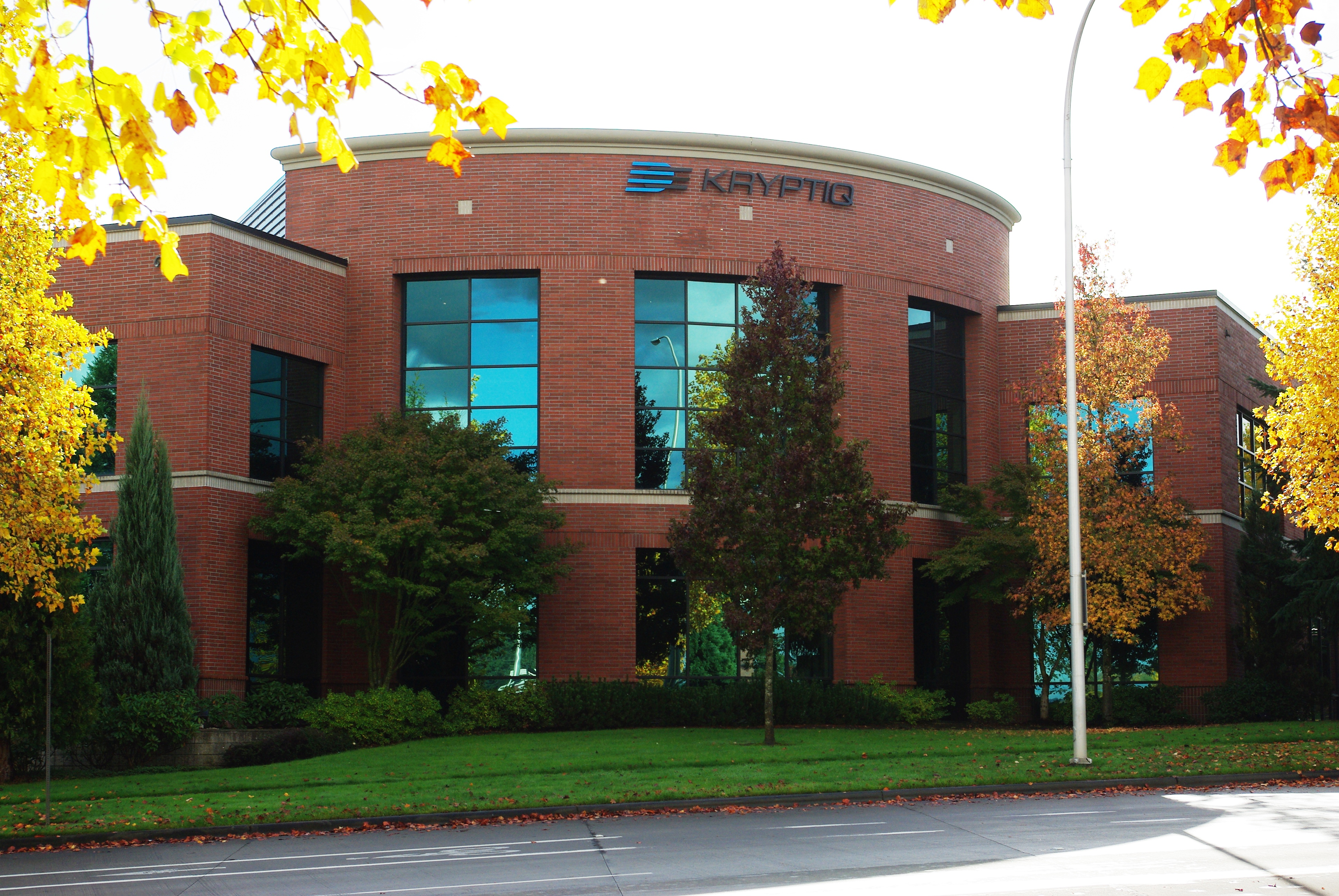
Company headquarters from 2010 to mid-2016

In March 2007, Kryptiq licensed their Choreo medical records system to The Regence Group in an effort to further penetrate the BlueCross and BlueShield marketplace, with implementation starting in June 2007. Microsoft teamed up with Kryptiq later in 2007 to launch HealthVault, a Microsoft product the later was using to enter the consumer healthcare market. The company sold off its software division that focused on health plan management to Porticio Systems in April 2009. In August 2008, the company bought Secure Network Solutions.

=== 2010–2015 ===
The company announced in June 2010 they would move to the AmberGlen business park into a 22,721-square-foot (2,110.8 m^{2}) space. In October 2010, Surescripts invested in Kryptiq and signed-on to use Kryptiq's secure technology in Surescripts’ products. At the time, Kryptiq had climbed to 90 employees, and the next month secured an $8 million investment related to the Surescripts deal. Growth from the Surescripts deal led to an increase of employees to 120.

Surescripts acquired all of Kryptiq in August 2012. At the time of the purchase, Kryptiq had revenues of about $25 million annually and 125 employees.

In January 2015, the company announced that it was splitting from Surescripts and becoming independent again. The company changed its name to Enli Health Intelligence in September 2015.

=== 2021–present ===
In January 2021, Enli was acquired by Cedar Gate Technologies, based in Connecticut. Later in 2021, all references to Enli, other than historical references, were removed from Cedar Gate's website.

== Products ==
Kryptiq licensed a variety of healthcare related software to both healthcare providers and health insurers. These products included CareManager, DocuSign for Patients, Secure Messaging, Automated Clinical Messaging, Patient Portal, ePrescribing, and others that provided services such as document management. The Secure Messaging program was the backbone of the network utilized by parent company Surescripts, which was used by doctors to share patient records and information electronically. Kryptiq's Patient Portal allowed providers to accept payments from patients over the internet, which totaled almost $10 million in 2011. Customers included Providence Health System, MeritCare Health System, GE Healthcare, and MedStar Health, among others.
