= Near-Life Experience =

Studio album by Come
- Released: May 21, 1996
- Recorded: November 1995 – December 1995
- Studios: Idful, Chicago, Illinois; Fort Apache, Cambridge, Massachusetts
- Genres: Alternative rock Blues
- Labels: Matador; Domino
- Producers: Andy Bryant; Wally Gagel; John McEntire

Come chronology
Don't Ask, Don't Tell (1994)	Near-Life Experience (1996)	Gently Down the Stream (1998)

Singles from Near-Life Experience
- 1. "Secret Number" Released: April 1996

Near-Life Experience is the third studio album by Boston alternative rock band Come, released in May 1996 on Matador Records in the US and on Domino Records in the UK.

== History ==
After Come's 1994 release Don't Ask Don't Tell, bassist Sean O'Brien and drummer Arthur Johnson left the band to pursue other careers. Remaining members Chris Brokaw and Thalia Zedek recorded Near Life Experience with two different rhythm sections: one half of the album was recorded with drummer Mac McNeilly of the Jesus Lizard and Bundy K. Brown of Tortoise and Gastr Del Sol, the other half recorded with Kevin Coultas and Tara Jane O'Neil of Rodan and The Sonora Pine. Other contributors to the album included Edward Yazijian from Kustomized and Jeff Goddard from Karate, both rock bands hailing from Boston, MA.

The title of the album resulted from "a slip of the tongue," as Zedek states, she "was telling someone [she had] had a 'near life experience,' but meant to say near death experience. Chris [Brokaw] was cracking up at the imagery of that." Thus, the phrase was chosen as the album's title.

In April 1996, the song "Secret Number" was released as a single, featuring "Prize" and "Hurricane II", a piano version of Near-Life Experience's opening track, as b-sides.

== Critical reception ==
Professional ratings
Review scores
Source	Rating
AllMusic	link
The Encyclopedia of Popular Music	link
Magnet	Positive link
MusicHound Rock	link

In its review of the album, CMJ New Music Monthly stated: "Near-Life Experience is heavier, and at the same time prettier, than Come has ever sounded." The Rough Guide to Rock asserted that the album "came from a totally revitalized band," going on to state that "[t]ighter, more focused songwriting, better overall musicianship and a readiness to trim the flab from the longer pieces resulted in a powerful album, ready to step outside the neo-blues framework towards a gentler, more reflexive sound." Option's review maintained that "much of Near Life Experience seems to echo Sticky Fingers' druggy, smoldering ambience," adding that "these eight harrowing tracks are as muscular and original as anything promised by Come's first two LPs. This shit is pure." Similarly, Trouser Press stated that "Zedek's affinity for narcoleptic waltz-time constructions — like the one that wraps around "Hurricane" — has never been more apropos, given the dazed tone of most of the album's eight songs, particularly the pair that ramble forward led by Brokaw's parched lead vocals." The Minnesota Daily described the album as "just about perfect," whilst Alternative Press stated that "[r]ather than sounding like a disjointed all-star jam, Near Life Experience emerges as Come’s strongest, most cohesive moment to date."

== Track listing ==
No.	Title	Writer(s)	Length
1.	"Hurricane"	Come	5:55
2.	"Weak as the Moon"	Come	4:11
3.	"Secret Number"	Come	4:02
4.	"Bitten"	Come	4:28
5.	"Shoot Me First"	Come	3:44
6.	"Walk On's"	Come	3:17
7.	"Half Life"	Come	3:26
8.	"Sloe-Eyed"	Come	3:34

== Personnel ==
- Thalia Zedek – vocals, guitar
- Chris Brokaw – guitar, vocals, synth, bass in "Secret Number"

with

- Mac McNeilly – drums on "Hurricane", "Secret Number", "Bitten", and "Half Life"
- Bundy K. Brown – bass on "Hurricane", "Secret Number", "Bitten", and "Half Life"
- Jeff Goddard – trumpet on "Bitten"
- Ed Yazijian – violin on "Hurricane"
- Beth Heinberg – piano on "Hurricane", organ on "Weak as the Moon" and "Sloe-Eyed"
- Nancy Asch – percussion on "Weak as the Moon" and "Half Life"
- Kevin Coultas – drums on "Weak as the Moon", "Shoot Me First", "Walk On's", and "Sloe-Eyed"
- Tara Jane O'Neil – bass on "Weak as the Moon", "Shoot Me First", "Walk On's", and "Sloe-Eyed", and vocals on "Sloe-Eyed"
- John McEntire – marimba on "Walk On's"
