= Don't Ask, Don't Tell (album) =

Studio album by Come
- Released: October 1994
- Recorded: February–March 1994
- Genre: Alternative rock; punk blues; noise rock; slowcore
- Length: 51:37
- Label: Matador; Beggars Banquet; Cortex
- Producer: Come; Bryce Goggin; Mike McMackin; Carl Plaster

Come chronology
11:11 (1992)	Don't Ask, Don't Tell (1994)	Near-Life Experience (1996)

Singles from Don't Ask, Don't Tell
- 1. "Wrong Side" Released: 31 March 1994; 2. "In/Out" Released: 1994; 3. "String" Released: 1995

Don't Ask, Don't Tell is the second album by Boston indie rock band Come.

== Background ==
Recorded by Carl Plaster, with whom Come had worked in their previous album, and Mike McMackin, who had previously worked with Brokaw's former band Codeine, at Easley Studios in Memphis, Tennessee, Baby Monster in New York City, and The Outpost in Stoughton, Massachusetts, between February and March 1994, Don't Ask, Don't Tell is Come's second album. It was mixed Plaster and Bryce Goggin between May and June 1994 at RPM Studios, in New York, and released in October 1994.

The title of the album is, to some extent, a reference to the official United States policy on gay, lesbian, and bisexual people serving in the military, "Don't ask, don't tell", which would remain in place from December 21, 1993, to September 20, 2011. As Brokaw has stated, the title is "definitely a political reference, and we were definitely pointing up the absurdity of the policy. But we also wanted it to be open ended...", going on to add that "it [also] referred to secrecy, [to] how some people around us were living."

The band recorded music videos for "In/Out", directed by Julie Hardin and Amanda P. Cole, and "String" and "German Song", both directed by Sadie Benning. "String" was also released as a single in 1994, as was the song "Wrong Side" the following year.

== Critical reception ==
Professional ratings
Review scores
Source	Rating
AllMusic	4.5/5 stars
The Encyclopedia of Popular Music	3/5 stars
Entertainment Weekly	B
Mondosonoro	9/10
MusicHound Rock	3.5/5 stars
Ox-Fanzine	4.5/5 stars

Spin magazine's review of Don't Ask, Don't Tell stated that "[t]hese punky peaks, R&B valleys, and mysterioso detours into 'Hernando's Hideaway' chordings merely map the route of some of the most symbiotic, emotionally affecting guitar pas de deux in recent memory." The Rough Guide to Rock stated that "the music was muddier, its pace slower, its pall heavier" than in Don't Ask, Don't Tell 's predecessor, 1992's 11:11. In its review of the album, Musician magazine described Come as "a revelation", going on to state that the guitars of Chris Brokaw and Thalia Zedek "intertwine portentous conversations like birds on barbed wire." The magazine characterization of the band's sound was as follows: "Using a bedrock of blues and punk (instead of warmed-over heavy metal), the quartet connects on a grandly visceral scale, creating a roughly frayed sound whose threads may be lost on the mainstream of the current 'alternative' audience." Melody Maker's review of the album characterized it as "one of the chilliest records you’ll ever hear" and praised the band's music, describing it as "two guitars twining and lacerating, drums and bass that make up a double bed of nails," whilst Neil Strauss, writing for The New York Times described it as "devastating, with slow, burning songs that shudder and wince beneath Ms. Zedek's pained growl."

== Personnel ==
- Thalia Zedek – vocals, guitar, percussion
- Chris Brokaw – guitar, vocals, percussion
- Sean O'Brien – bass
- Arthur Johnson – drums, vocals

with

- Mike McMackin – piano

== Track listing ==
No.	Title	Writer(s)	Length
1.	"Finish Line"	Come	6:34
2.	"Mercury Falls"	Come	4:16
3.	"Yr Reign"	Come	4:19
4.	"Poison"	Come	2:26
5.	"Let's Get Lost"	Come	7:07
6.	"String"	Come	3:49
7.	"German Song"	Come	5:54
8.	"In/Out"	Come	4:45
9.	"Wrong Side"	Come	4:45
10.	"Arrive"	Come	7:36

2021 Expanded Edition Reissue – Wrong Sides
No.	Title	Writer(s)	Length
1.	"Car"	Come	6:04
2.	"Last Mistake"	Come	5:42
3.	"Submerge"	Come	4:21
4.	"Loin of the Surf"	Swell Maps	2:05
5.	"SVK"	Come	2:49
6.	"German Song (Demo)"	Come	5:51
7.	"Adult Books"	X	3:45
8.	"Who Jumped in my Grave"	Come	4:48
9.	"Angelhead"	Come	4:00
10.	"Cimarron"	Come	3:58
