= Fighting Season (album) =

Studio album by Thalia Zedek
- Released: September 21, 2018
- Recorded: Late 2017 to early 2018
- Studio: Kimchee Records, Cambridge, MA
- Genre: Alternative rock, Blues rock, Indie rock
- Length: 38:34
- Label: Thrill Jockey
- Producer: Andy Hong

Thalia Zedek chronology
Eve (2016)	Fighting Season (2018)

Professional ratings
Review scores
Source	Rating
Ox-Fanzine	3.5/5 stars
musicOMH	4/5 stars
Allmusic	4/5 stars
Spectrum Culture	Positive
Dusted Magazine	Positive
Mojo	4/5 stars

Fighting Season is Thalia Zedek's seventh solo album, released two years after Eve.

== Background ==
Released by Thrill Jockey on September 21, 2018, two years after her previous solo album Eve, Fighting Season was recorded in late 2017 to early 2018 at Kimchee Studios, in Cambridge, MA. Zedek's fourth solo album to be credited to the Thalia Zedek Band, Fighting Season was engineered and mixed by producer Andy Hong, who co-owns Kimchee Studios, and mastered by Sarah Register.

The material in Fighting Season "was written leading up to and following the 2016 U.S. elections," which contributed to the political themes of many of its songs. The writing process was vastly different from that of Zedek's previous solo albums, as she "took a more isolated approach [...] writing the material on her own and only presenting the songs to the full ensemble shortly before recording." Furthermore, Zedek made the conscious decision to "make sure that not everybody in the band is playing on every song," so as to allow the record to "have some space."

The line-up of the Thalia Zedek Band remained unchanged from Eve to Fighting Season.

Two longtime friends of Zedek's are featured as "Special Guests" on the record. Chris Brokaw—Zedek's frequent collaborator and former Come guitarist and bandmate— contributed guitar to the first two tracks on the record, specifically, "Bend Again" and "What I Wanted". Dinosaur Jr.'s vocalist and guitarist J Mascis, meanwhile, contributed the guitar solo for "Bend Again", the album's opening song. This marks the second time Mascis and Zedek have collaborated on a studio record, and the first since Zedek provided vocals to three songs in Dinosaur Jr.'s 1994 album Without a Sound, namely, "Yeah Right", "Grab It", and "Get Out of This". "Bend Again" "had been written with Mascis's solo in mind." As Zedek herself put it, "[w]hen I wrote the song, I could hear J's guitar playing in it. [...] In the studio, I tried to do my best rough, inept version of a J Mascis solo. But it didn't work, so I decided to just ask him." As it turned out, Mascis was recording Elastic Days at his home studio in Amherst, Massachusetts. "He just said, 'Send me the track. I'll do it.' It was what the song needed." Meanwhile, Brokaw's contributions were the result of coincidence, as Brokaw had also booked recording time at Kinchee Studios for his 2019 album End of the Night, soon after his return to Boston. Thalia Zedek Band members Jonah Sacks and David Michael Curry both ended up contributing cello and viola, respectively, to End of the Night.

The title of the album comes from "a term originally coined for the period of time in Afghanistan when winter comes to an end and fighting in the region would resume." Zedek's reinterprets it as connecting it to the theme of "resistance, on a time to fight for oneself or to protest the deteriorating political landscape." The title is meant to contain a dual reference to the public and the private, as it is "also a reference to personal relationships."

== Track listing ==
All songs and lyrics by Thalia Zedek.

No.	Title	Writer(s)	Length
1.	"Bend Again"	Thalia Zedek	5:49
2.	"What I Wanted"	Thalia Zedek	4:39
3.	"Fighting Season"	Thalia Zedek	3:14
4.	"Of the Unknown"	Thalia Zedek	4:15
5.	"Ladder"	Thalia Zedek	4:45
6.	"War Not Won"	Thalia Zedek	4:52
7.	"The Lines"	Thalia Zedek	3:54
8.	"We Will Roll"	Thalia Zedek	2:57
9.	"Tower"	Thalia Zedek	4:09

== Personnel ==
Thalia Zedek Band

- Thalia Zedek – guitar, vocals
- Winston Braman – bass
- David Michael Curry – viola, back-up vocals
- Mel Lederman – piano
- Jonathan Ulman – drums

Additional musicians

- Chris Brokaw – guitar on "Bend Again" and "What I Wanted"
- J. Mascis – guitar solo on "Bend Again"
- Jonah Sacks – cello on "Fighting Season", "We Will Roll", and "Tower"

Additional personnel

- Andy Hong –Engineering and mixing
- Sarah Register – Mastering
- Carmine Marrano – Cover photo
- Dmitry Samarov – Drawing
- Dan Zedek – Design

== Critical reception ==
On Metacritic, the album has a weighted average score of 82 out of 100, based on 5 critics, indicating "universal acclaim". Mojo magazine's review of Fighting Season declared that "[i]t never feels as though [Zedek's] best work is behind her." Bekki Bemrose's four-star review for musicOMH praised the album's production, claiming its "beautifully warm and naturalistic [aesthetic] brings these inherently intimate songs closer still." Furthermore, Bemrose saw similarities between the political nature of the album and the work of Woody Guthrie, going on to draw a parallel between Guthrie's famous This machine kills fascists guitar label and Zedek's FCK NZS guitar sticker on the cover of Fighting Season. Allmusic's review of the record, written by Mark Deming, characterised Fighting Season as "an album that always reflects the era that informed it, and while Thalia Zedek never pretends to have all the answers, her musings are brave, literate, and full of heart, and this is an important statement from an important artist." Justin Cober-Lake, writing for Spectrum Culture, praised the album, stating that "guitar fills much of the disc with open, controlled lines that remain shadowy despite the spaces." In her review for Dusted Magazine, Jennifer Kelly, asserts that "[t]here's something grand and strong and provocative about the march of her songs, yet also a nod to entropy and futility in the way they fall apart."
