= Spore (band) =

American noise rock band

- Origin: Boston, Massachusetts, United States
- Genres: Noise rock
- Years active: 1992–1994
- Labels: Taang!
- Members: Mona Elliot; Ayal Naor; Marc Orlean; Christian Negrette

Spore was a noise rock band from Boston, Massachusetts formed in the wake of the early 1990s grunge movement. Spore were signed in 1993 on the Taang! Records label, the same label which initially signed The Lemonheads, the Mighty Mighty Bosstones and Mission of Burma, with whom the band released a 7 inch EP.

Lead singer Mona Elliot's voice has been described as channelling "anger and determination with a style heavily influenced by early Throwing Muses-era Kristin Hersh." The Spore song Fun, from the group's third album was included in the Natural Born Killers film, though it was not released on the official film soundtrack CD. The band was also known for sporting an image of André the Giant on their disc covers, with the image being similar to Shepard Fairey's well known pop art interpretation, Andre the Giant Has a Posse.

Elliot went on to form another well-regarded Boston-based band, Victory at Sea, in 1996. Ayal Naor started up the avant-garde band 27 with members of the Boston band Dirt Merchants, while also contributing on fellow Boston band Isis' critically acclaimed album Oceanic as well as touring with the band.

== Band members ==
- Mona Elliott (vocals, guitar, bass)
- Ayal Naor (vocals, bass, guitar)
- Marc Orleans (guitars, vocals)
- Christian Negrette (drums, vocals)

== Discography ==
=== LPs ===
- Spore (1993 - Taang! Records — Recorded in June and September 1992 and March 1993 - Number One / Lee / Fun / Feedback / She Makes Me Feel Violent / Splinter / Bleeding Gums / Fear God)
- Giant (1994 - Taang! Records — Recorded at Fort Apache, Cambridge, Massachusetts in September, 1993 - Paradise / Power Behind / Red To Green / Sick / Crazy Summer / Untitled / Age / Gunfire / Samantha / Black Nail / Flesh Eater)

=== Singles ===
- Number One/Splinter (1992 - Cinder Block Records)
- Fear God/I Want You (She's So Heavy) (1993 - Taang! Records)
- Fear God (1993 - Taang! Records)

Fear God / She's So Heavy / Sick / Bleeding Gums

- Forcefeed / Power Behind (1993 split 7'' with Slughog)
- Active In The Yard (1993 - split 7'' with Mission Of Burma)
- Phuko & Flan Is Ta (1994 - split EP with Queer - Chunk Records)

== See also ==
- Noise Rock
- 27 (band)
- Victory at Sea (band)
