= Via (Thalia Zedek album) =

Studio album by Thalia Zedek
- Released: March 18, 2013
- Recorded: June 2012 and September 2012
- Studios: New Alliance Studio, Cambridge, MA; Translator Audio, Brooklyn, NY
- Genres: Alternative rock, Blues rock, Indie rock
- Length: 48:22
- Labels: Thrill Jockey
- Producer: Andrew Schneider

Thalia Zedek chronology
Liars and Prayers (2008)	Via (2013)	Six (2016)

Professional ratings
Review scores
Source	Rating
Allmusic	3.5/5 stars
Pitchfork	6.9/10 stars
PopMatters	Positive
Paste	8.3/10 stars
The Boston Globe	Positive
Financial Times	4/5 stars
musicOMH	4/5 stars
Louder Than War	5/10 stars

Via is Thalia Zedek's fifth solo album, released five years after Liars and Prayers.

== Background ==
Released by Thrill Jockey on March 18, 2013—half a decade after Zedek's previous solo album, 2008's Liars and Prayers— Via was recorded in June 2012 and September 2012 at New Alliance Studio, in Cambridge, MA and at Translator Audio, in Brooklyn, NY, respectively. Zedek's second solo album to be credited to the Thalia Zedek Band, Via was produced and engineered by longtime Zedek collaborator Andrew Schneider (Cave In, Unsane, Daughters). She and Schneider both shared mixing duties, which was then mastered by Josh Bonati at Bonati Mastering in Brooklyn, NY.

The material in Via was written during two distinct sessions over a period of four years. The touring that followed the release of Liars and Prayers provided the occasion for the first session, during which their then drummer Daniel Coughlin contributed to the process. Once the touring for Liars and Prayers ended, however, "Zedek's drummer Daniel Coughlin announced a move to Buenos Aires." Therefore, the band was forced to find a new percussionist, eventually, enlisting Dave Bryson (Son Volt). The remainder of the album was written after Bryson's arrival.

The album is dedicated to the memory of Mishael Zedek, Thalia Zedek's late father. Mishael Zedek, "[l]ongtime Professor of Mathematics at the University of Maryland", who died on December 14, 2010, at age 84.

== Track listing ==
All songs and lyrics by Thalia Zedek. All arrangements by the Thalia Zedek Band (Winston Braman, Dave Bryson, David Michael Curry, Mel Lederman, and Zedek).

No.	Title	Writer(s)	Length
1.	"Walk Away"	Thalia Zedek	5:12
2.	"Winning Hand"	Thalia Zedek	6:14
3.	"Get Away"	Thalia Zedek	5:17
4.	"He Said"	Thalia Zedek	3:25
5.	"In This World"	Thalia Zedek	3:57
6.	"Straight and Strong"	Thalia Zedek	5:12
7.	"Go Home"	Thalia Zedek	3:46
8.	"Lucky One"	Thalia Zedek	6:58
9.	"Want You to Know"	Thalia Zedek	8:21

== Personnel ==
Thalia Zedek Band

- Thalia Zedek – vocals, guitars
- David Michael Curry – viola
- Mel Lederman – piano
- Winston Braman – bass guitar
- Dave Bryson – drums, percussion

Additional personnel

- Andrew Schneider – Production, Engineering, Mixing
- Thalia Zedek – Mixing
- Jonathan Taft –Assistant engineering
- Josh Bonati – Mastering
- Dan Zedek – Design
- Thalia Zedek – Front cover photo
- Suara Welitoff – Inside photo

== Critical reception ==
On Metacritic, the album has a weighted average score of 76 out of 100, based on 8 critics, indicating "generally favourable reviews". Writing for Allmusic, Fred Thomas states that, in Via, "there's a nebulous sense of despair, but it's less an anguished confusion and more of the melancholy of acceptance that comes with a life full of heavy changes," going on to describe the album as "an incontestable force of nature". Although he criticised the sequencing of the songs in his otherwise positive review for Pitchfork, Matthew Murphy declared that "Thalia Zedek's voice has aged exceptionally well" and that it is the "slender reed of hope or recovery that continually shines through even Via's darkest moments." Writing for Paste, Mark Lore echoed this view, claiming that "[l]yrically Via is maybe more optimistic than anything Zedek has written before," ultimately concluding that "[I]f listening to Via makes you feel good, chances are Zedek is feeling good. Powerful stuff." According to Matthew Fiander's review of the album for PopMatters, "Via is [Zedek's] most vibrant and volatile set to date." Fiander then goes on to characterise it as "a new twist on old traditions", describing it as "an album about heartache and past betrayals and what could have been." Reviewing the album for The Boston Globe, Matt Parish writes that Via "is full of concise guitar solo breaks, chunky drumming, and a sense of broad-stroked experimentation that [Zedek's] previous efforts rarely touched." In his review for the Financial Times, Ludovic Hunter-Tinley states that "Via's songs surge and ebb with hypnotic riffs and feedbacky solos, cellos sawing away in the background, Zedek forcing the tune to bend to her rather than vice versa." Jordan Mainzer, writing for musicOMH, described Via as a "slowcore [that] ultimately falls apart and picks up into something more urgent, even if not always lively," claiming that the difference between this and Zedek's previous album "is a newfound sense of purpose and exhilaration. Not quite buoyant but still enthusiastic."
