= Electric Juices =

Studio album by Fuzzy
- Released: 1996
- Studio: Fort Apache
- Genre: Alternative pop
- Label: TAG/Atlantic
- Producers: Tim O’Heir, Paul Q. Kolderie

Fuzzy chronology
Fuzzy (1994)	Electric Juices (1996)	Hurray for Everything (1999)

Electric Juices is the second album by the American band Fuzzy, released in 1996.

The first single from the album was "Someday". Fuzzy promoted Electric Juices by touring with Velocity Girl and the Posies.

== Production ==
Recorded at Fort Apache Studios, the album was produced by Paul Q. Kolderie and Tim O’Heir. It contains a cover of the Beach Boys' "Girl Don't Tell Me", which was released as a single.

== Critical reception ==
Professional ratings
Review scores
Source	Rating
AllMusic	2/5 stars
The Encyclopedia of Popular Music	4/5 stars
Vancouver Sun	4/5 stars

Trouser Press wrote: "Sweetly engaging and as freshly cut as a suburban lawn on Sunday afternoon, Electric Juices is Fuzzy perfection." The Washington Post called the songs "buoyantly tuneful in the manner of '60s Top-40 fare," writing that "Fuzzy's melodic gifts dwarf those of most of its peers." The Orlando Sentinel concluded that "the distorted guitars and heavy, post-punk rhythms make for an interesting contrast with the New Wave-y 'Drag', the power-poppy 'Sleeper' and the bouncy 'Girl Don't Tell Me'."

The Intelligencer Journal deemed the album "guitar pop of a high order," writing that "what makes Fuzzy special is the harmony singing of [Chris] Toppin and [Hilken] Mancini, whose voices blend beautifully." The Vancouver Sun opined: "Blasting open with zippy burst of harmonies and a driving beat, Fuzzy fills out more space than the cuddle-core movement and its diametric opposite: riot-grrl thrust." The New York Daily News thought that Mancini "boasts an appealingly impish sound, while her band specializes in dinky alternative-pop." The Boston Herald included Electric Juices on its list of the 10 best albums of 1996.

AllMusic wrote that "'Someday' and 'Christmas' are the only tracks that have the ambition to be more than just sunny mid-tempo rockers, but their impact is reduced by the sedated state of mindless comfort listeners are placed into over the course of the first nine songs."

== Track listing ==
No.	Title	Length
1.	"Glad Again"
2.	"Drag"
3.	"Throw Me a Bone"
4.	"Girl Don't Tell Me"
5.	"Miss the Mark"
6.	"Sleeper"
7.	"Flavor"
8.	"It Started Today"
9.	"One Request"
10.	"Someday"
11.	"Pop a Dime"
12.	"Uncut"
13.	"Christmas"

== Personnel ==
- Winston Braman – bass
- Hilken Mancini – vocals, guitar
- David Ryan – drums
- Chris Toppin – vocals, guitar
