= Fuzzy (band) =

1990s American indie pop band

- Origin: Boston, Massachusetts
- Genres: Indie pop
- Labels: Atlantic Records; Half a Cow; TAG Recordings
- Past members: Hilken Mancini; Chris Toppin; Winston Braman; David Ryan; Nate Darden

Fuzzy was an American indie pop band based in Boston during the 1990s. The band was composed of singer-guitarists Hilken Mancini and Chris Toppin, and bassist Winston Braman. The drummer role was filled by David Ryan of Lemonheads for their first two records, and Nate Darden for Hurray For Everything.

The first Fuzzy release was the Fuzzy EP, a CD of the band's demo recordings, released by Australian label Half a Cow.

'Flashlight', the lead single from their eponymous first album, narrowly missed an NME Single Of The Week award. In August 2016, Rolling Stone named Flashlight as one of top 50 songs of the 1990s.

In 1996 Fuzzy released their second album, Electric Juices. Fuzzy supported Electric Juices by touring with Juliana Hatfield, Belly, Buffalo Tom, Velocity Girl and The Posies. In the months following the tour, Fuzzy was dropped by Atlantic Records. David Ryan left to attend grad school and was replaced by Nate Darden in 1997.

1999 saw the release of their final album, Hurray For Everything on the independent Catapult label.

== Discography ==
Mini-album:

- Fuzzy EP (Half a Cow, 1993)

Albums:

- Fuzzy (Seed, 1994)
- Electric Juices (TAG Recordings, 1996)
- Hurray for Everything (Catapult, 1999)
