= Hilken Mancini =

American singer-songwriter

- Born: February 5, 1970 (age 56); Syracuse, New York
- Origin: United States
- Genre: Rock
- Occupations: Singer, songwriter, musician, author, aerobics teacher
- Label: Atlantic Records

Hilken Mancini (born February 5, 1970) is an American singer, songwriter, musician, author, and aerobics teacher, best known as the co-founder of Punk Rock Aerobics and Girls Rock Campaign Boston. She has been a member of the bands Fuzzy, The Count Me Outs, Shepherdess, The Monsieurs, and Band of Their Own. She also directed the music video for the Green Day song “Here Comes the Shock”, which features her doing her Punk Rock Aerobics.

== Biography ==
=== Early years ===
Hilken was born and grew up in Syracuse, NY.

=== Fuzzy ===
Hilken formed the rock band Fuzzy, with Christine Toppin and Winston Braman in 1992. Fuzzy was signed by Atlantic Records for whom they released two albums. Their 1994 debut, Fuzzy, attracted attention thanks to its lead single Flashlight. The video for Flashlight was directed by Jesse Peretz. In August 2016, Rolling Stone named Flashlight as one of top 50 songs of the 1990s.

Two years later, Fuzzy released Electric Juices. Fuzzy supported Electric Juices by touring with Juliana Hatfield, Belly, Buffalo Tom, Velocity Girl and The Posies. In the months following the tour, Fuzzy was dropped by Atlantic Records. David Ryan left to attend grad school and was replaced by Nate Darden in 1997.

In 1999 Fuzzy released their final album, Hurray For Everything on the independent Catapult label.

=== Punk Rock Aerobics ===
In 2001, Mancini and Maura Jasper founded Punk Rock Aerobics (PRA) Punk Rock Aerobics, a DIY exercise program providing an alternative for those disenchanted with rigid body-image based gym culture. The pair ran exercise classes in rock clubs, employing “rock star” DJs such as J Mascis (Dinosaur Jr.) and Mike Watt (Minutemen) to spin punk records for each session. In 2004, Da Capo Press published their exercise book, Punk Rock Aerobics. In February 2021 Hilken starred in a Green Day video “Here Comes the Shock” doing her Punk Rock Aerobics.

=== 2000s ===
From 2001 through 2005, Mancini played guitar for The Count Me Outs, fronted by Mark Perretta (Folk Implosion) with Winston Braman on bass and Mike Savage on drums.

Hilken contributed the story Biker Babe to That Takes Ovaries! published by Three Rivers Press in 2002.

While Fuzzy were on hiatus, Mancini co-produced and released an album on Kimchee Records in 2005 with bassist/vocalist Chris Colbourn of Buffalo Tom called Hilken Mancini And Chris Colbourn with Winston Braman on bass, drummer Mike Savage from Fudge and Cherry 2000, and guest guitar work by J Mascis of Dinosaur Jr.

In 2006, Mancini formed Shepherdess, again with Savage on drums and Braman on bass, adding Emily Arkin on violin. Shepherdess, their eponymous debut album was self-released in 2007. By 2008, Savage and Braman moved on and were replaced by Alison Murray on drums with Arkin playing baritone guitar

=== Girls Rock Camp ===
After volunteering to run Punk Rock Aerobics sessions at Girls Rock Camp in Portland, Oregon from 2007 to 2009, Hilken founded Girls Rock Campaign Boston with Nora Allen-Wiles and Mary Lou Lord in 2010 with seed money from Cambridge-based rock entrepreneur Billy Ruane. Girls Rock Campaign Boston (GRCB) is a member of the Girls Rock Camp Alliance, a foundation created to empower girls to believe in themselves by providing a supportive community that fosters self-expression, confidence, and collaboration through musical education and performance.

=== 2010s ===
In 2012, Mancini formed “The Monsieurs”, a garage punk band, with Andy Macbain (Tunnel of Love) and drummer Erin King. The Monsieurs have released two full-length albums (The Monsieurs and Deux) and several singles on the Slovenly label. On July 21, 2018, The Monsieurs were asked to open for the Foo Fighters at Boston's Fenway Park. Hilken also works as a back-up vocalist, doing sessions with Tanya Donelly (Belly), Juliana Hatfield, Buffalo Tom, and several projects with David Derby (The Dambuilders, Grammercy Arms).

In 2015, Mancini was asked to join “A Band of their Own” (BOTO), an ad hoc group of women musicians including Kay Hanley (Letters to Cleo), Belly's Tanya Donelly and Gail Greenwood, Jen Trynin, Magen Tracy, Jenny Dee and Hilken's bandmate in Fuzzy, Chris Toppin. BOTO performs at Theo and Paul Epstein's “Hot Stove, Cool Music” for the benefit of the Foundation to Be Named Later in both Boston (in February 2018) and Chicago.

=== 2020s ===
In February 2021, Hilken was asked by the acclaimed punk band Green Day to produce a video for their upcoming single, "Here Comes the Shock". The single was previewed at the NHL's Outdoor Hockey game in Lake Tahoe. The video, featuring Hilken performing a Punk Rock Aerobics routine to the single, was released in the US on February 21. The video received over 160,000 hits in its first 16 hours on YouTube.

Hilken is married to songwriter-musician Andy Macbain (Tunnel of Love, The Monsieurs, Andy California) and is the guitarist in The Monsieurs, the drummer for Andy California and vocalist for The Mardi Kings. She is also the proprietor of 40 South Street, a Jamaica Plain Mass. vintage clothing boutique.
