= United Record Pressing =

Vinyl pressing plant in Nashville, Tennessee, US

The United logo

United Record Pressing (founded as Southern Plastics) is a vinyl pressing plant located in Nashville, Tennessee, that has been in operation since 1949. United has pressed records for such artists as the Beatles, Stevie Wonder, Michael Jackson, Jack White, Adele, Mumford & Sons, Hank Williams Jr., Marie Osmond, Tammy Wynette, Loretta Lynn, Dolly Parton, Lady Antebellum, Justin Timberlake, Kanye West, Kings of Leon, Fall Out Boy, Kendrick Lamar, the Black Keys, the Roots, and Radiohead.

Today, it is the largest vinyl record pressing plant in the United States.

== Company history ==
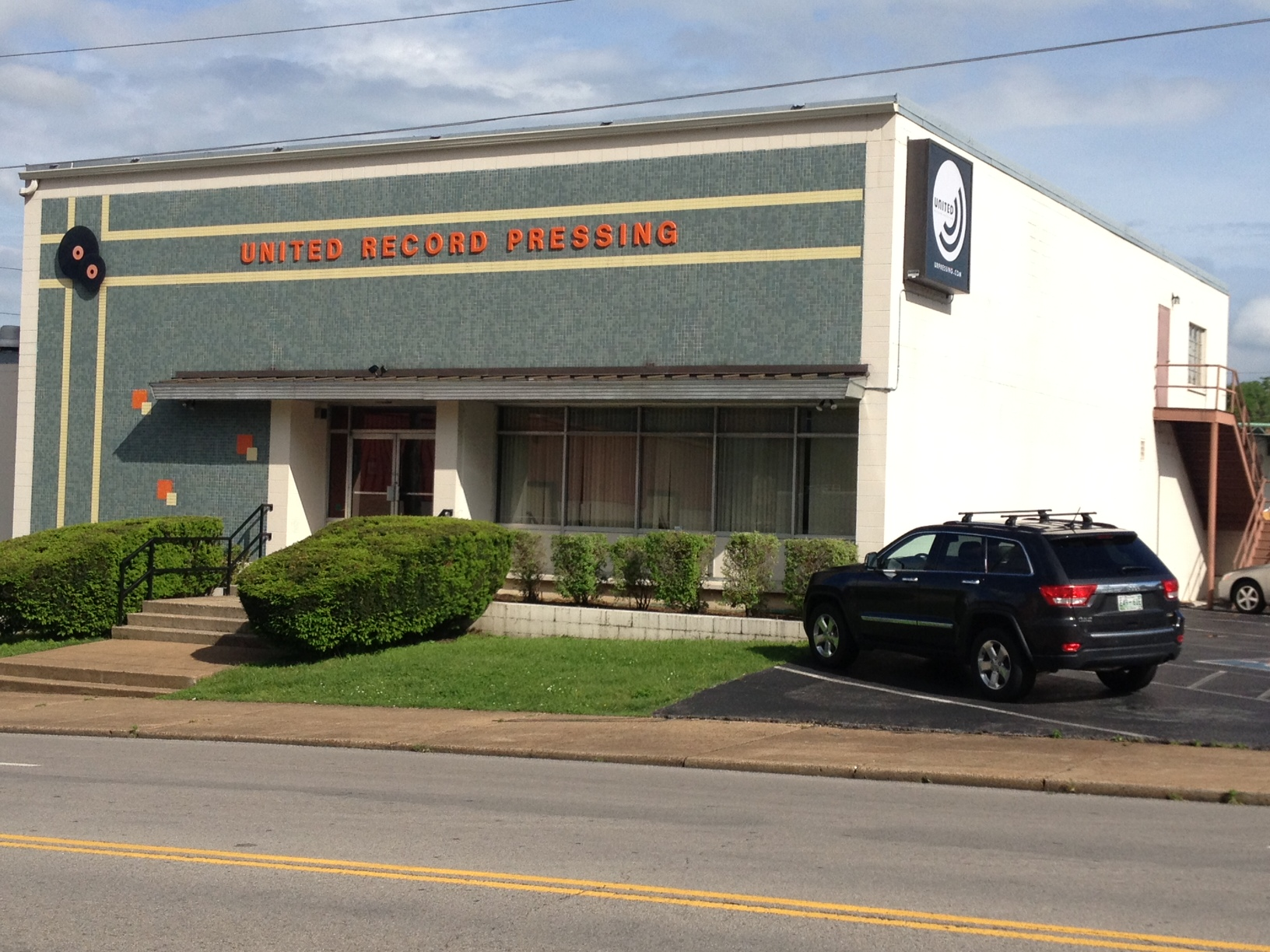
United Record Pressing in 2013

United was founded by Ozell Simpkins, John Dunn, and Joe Talbot under the name "Southern Plastics" in 1949, the same year that RCA introduced the 45 rpm record. They found success by working with independent labels like Motown to produce 45 rpm singles for jukeboxes and the everyday consumer.

In 1962, the company moved to its current location at 453 Chestnut Street from 512 Franklin Street in Nashville, Tennessee. This is the building where United would be contracted by Vee Jay Records to press the Beatles first 7-inch records in North America. The building and the machine presses inside of it were all designed by Ozell Simpkins after he spent two months in Brussels, Belgium, researching modern pressing plants. A majority of these machines only pressed 45s. United gained the ability to press 12-inchers when they bought the presses from Dixie Record Pressing, another Nashville plant that was winding down.

In 1971, under new management, the name was changed from "Southern Plastics" to United Record Pressing.

== Motown Suite ==
When United first opened the doors at the Chestnut location in 1962, the South was still segregated. Many of the African American customers, executives, and musicians had trouble finding hotels or restaurants that would offer them service. Two of United's biggest clients were Motown and Vee-Jay Records, both labels run by people of color. In response to that, the company built the United Hilton Suite, which would later go on to be known as The Motown Suite. This suite is an area on the second floor of the building that is an apartment-style living space. This area is still viewable to guests touring the plant. It has the same furnishings that were offered to the visiting patrons back in the 1960s. This includes a common room with a bar, plenty of seating for guests, a full bathroom, a double-occupancy bedroom, a kitchen equipped with an old push-button stove and other novel 60s decor.

URP still uses the kitchen as a conference room, having staff meetings while sitting around the same table that the executives and artists used.

== Upstairs ==
Next to the Motown Suite on the second floor of the building is a large space that is used to host record release parties and other events for labels and artists. Among the many, it is believed that this room hosted parties for the Supremes, Smokey Robinson, the Cowsills, Wayne Newton, and a signing party for a 16-year-old Hank Williams Jr. It also functions as a small museum to the company and the history of recorded music. Among other uses, this room houses the Upstairs at United series.

Upstairs at United is a series of all-analog recordings recorded on the second floor of United. All recordings were direct to analog tape under the leadership Chris Mara of Welcome to 1979 Studios, then cut to 12-inch EPs at 45 rpm. The purpose of the Upstairs at United series is to put out music recorded in an all-analog style, and to celebrate the outstanding musical and cultural history that has taken place inside this building.

All recordings are engineered by Mara and his analog studio in Nashville, Tennessee. All recordings were done live directly to one-quarter-inch analog tape using a sixteen-channel vintage recording console and vintage microphones and outboard gear, with no overdubs, edits or audio sweetening.

The series has included artists such as Brendan Benson, North Mississippi Allstars, Keane, and Smoke Fairies.

== Innovations ==
Together with various clients including Third Man Records, United has pioneered new innovations to the vinyl world such as:

- Various unique vinyl sizes including 5", 8", 13"
- Liquid center vinyl - A record that contains a small amount of colored water in its center section.
- Triple-decker record - A 12-inch vinyl that contains a 7" inside its center section. The 12" must be broken to reach the 7".
- Tri-color vinyl - A record that has three separate colors in the same disk.
- Under the Label Grooves - A record where a playable song has been pressed underneath the paper of the center label.
- The Automated Dual-Color Record Press - Due to high demand for split color vinyl, United fabricated an existing press to take from two different color sources to create a press that could automate the split color process.

== Expansion ==
Because of high demand, the company moved to larger facilities in 2017 at 453 Allied Drive in Nashville.

== Criticism ==
United has faced criticism primarily for inconsistent quality control, leading to warped, scuffed, or noisy records, often attributed to high demand overwhelming older machinery and rushed production. Employee reviews also cite poor management, bad working conditions (smells, hygiene, micromanagement), high turnover, and inadequate training, contrasting with a few positive notes on giving second chances. While United is a major player in a booming vinyl market, its reputation among collectors suffers from these quality and workplace issues.
