= Suffragette Sessions =

1998 tour

The Suffragette Sessions Tour was a musical event in 1998. Amy Ray and Emily Saliers of the Indigo Girls organized a loose amalgamation of female artists that Ray described as "a socialist experiment in rock and roll--no hierarchy, no boundaries." Unlike Lilith Fair or some other music events of the era, this tour was not a benefit or effort to raise awareness for any social cause.

The participants included Gail Ann Dorsey, Lisa Germano, Lourdes Pérez, Kate Schellenbach, Jane Siberry, Jean Smith, Josephine Wiggs and Thalia Zedek. Each musician sang or played in combination with some of the others. There were eleven cities on the tour, including Minneapolis, Chicago, Cleveland, Cincinnati, Philadelphia, and New York City. Japanese bands Shonen Knife and Buffalo Daughter opened some of the shows.
