= Gently Down the Stream =

1998 studio album by Come

Studio album by Come
- Released: February 18, 1998
- Recorded: July 1997
- Genres: Alternative rock, blues
- Length: 66:34
- Labels: Matador; Domino
- Producers: Paul Q. Kolderie, Carl Plaster, Brian Dunton, Roger Seibel

Come chronology
Near-Life Experience (1996)	Gently Down the Stream (1998)

Gently Down The Stream is the fourth and final album by Boston indie rock band Come.

== History ==
Recorded and mixed by Paul Q. Kolderie at Fort Apache in 1997 during the month of June and released in late February 1998, Gently Down the Stream is Come's fourth and, as it would eventually transpire, final album. As its predecessor, 1996's Near-Life Experience, a number of different musicians joined Thalia Zedek and Chris Brokaw to fill the void caused by the departure of drummer Arthur Johnson and bassist Sean O'Brien, the band's original rhythm section. Winston Bramen, who would later work with the Thalia Zedek Band and with Chris Brokaw in Consonant, played bass, whilst Daniel Coughlin was in charge of percussion and drums. Coughlin would also go on to tour and record 4 more records with Zedek's solo project, the Thalia Zedek Band until leaving in 2008.

The name of the album can be seen as either a reference to the title of Su Friedrich's 1981 short film Gently Down the Stream or an allusion to the lyrics to English language nursery rhyme "Row, Row, Row Your Boat". As Zedek has stated, Daniel Coughlin, the band's "drummer had made this recording of all these songs he had written, one of the songs involved 'row, row, row your boat.' Plus there was the cover we used (of someone watching an enormous wave collapse from shore), and I was thinking, 'gently down the stream' seems like a good theme for a record." Moreover, Zedek has described the title as a "urination analogy".

== Critical reception ==
Professional ratings
Review scores
Source	Rating
AllMusic	link
The A.V. Club	Positive link
The Encyclopedia of Popular Music	link
Entertainment Weekly	B+ link
Uncut	4/5 stars

Upon its release, CMJ New Music Monthly called Gently Down the Stream "a king-size record from a colossal band; those who like hard rock and have never heard Come are missing out," whilst Musician began its praiseful review of the album with a rhetorical question lamenting the fact that Come was clearly fated to remain in the underground: "Have you ever noticed how the music industry regularly champions its disposable waste but can't seem to hold faith in the staying power of its true talent?" Billboard listed Gently Down the Stream as one of the "10 Essential Matador Releases". The Rough Guide to Rock states that Gently Down the Stream showcased the band's "new-found delight in melody and volume settings lower than eleven (...) with the introspection overwhelmed by rage and thrashing guitarwork often enough for maximum listener comfort."

Speak magazine commented that "Come's fourth album doesn't meander gently down any stream. If anything, it's more like Whitewater rafting through a thundering maelstrom of guitars that empty occasionally into shallow pools," going on to describe its songs as "12 gorgeous mini-epics [that] are by turns spooky and sleazy." The Sunday Times' review of Gently Down the Stream praised the album in unambiguous terms, suggesting that "as sandpaper-larynxed Zedek shares vocals with co-guitarist Chris Brokaw's softer tones, and Come abandon overdriven effects in the name of economy and songwriting, suddenly they're a great American rock band." The review concluded that "Gently Down the Stream renders Come's indie ghettoisation absurd", stating the band's importance in no uncertain terms: "This is a world-class act."

== Track listing ==
No.	Title	Writer(s)	Length
1.	"One Piece"	Come	6:53
2.	"Recidivist"	Come	3:57
3.	"Stomp"	Come	5:43
4.	"Sorry Too Late"	Come	4:49
5.	"Saints Around My Neck"	Come	8:27
6.	"Silk City"	Come	4:52
7.	"Middle of Nowhere"	Come	4:05
8.	"The Fade-Outs"	Come	5:54
9.	"A Jam Blues"	Come	5:07
10.	"New Coat"	Come	5:20
11.	"The Former Model"	Come	3:12
12.	"March"	Come	8:15

== Personnel ==
- Thalia Zedek – vocals, guitar, clarinets
- Chris Brokaw – guitar, vocals, percussion, piano, organ
- Winston Bramen – bass guitar
- Daniel Coughlin – drums, percussion

with

- Beth Heinberg – piano on "The Fade-Outs" and "New Coat"
- J. Michael Billingsley – acoustic basses on "The Former Model"
