= Jaggery (band) =

American darkwave/avant-pop band

- Origin: Boston, Massachusetts, U.S.
- Genres: Avant-rock; Baroque pop; Dark wave; Jazz fusion
- Years active: 2004-present
- Members: Mali Sastri; Petaluma Vale; Daniel Schubmehl; Dylan Jack; Tony Leva; Rachel Jayson
- Past members: Raky Sastri; Jesse Sparhawk; Maeve Gilchrist; Jonah Sacks; Ziggy Drozdowski
- Website: jaggery.org

Jaggery is an American avant-rock band based in Boston, Massachusetts. The band was founded in 2004 in New York City by Mali Sastri (a.k.a. Singer Mali) with her brother Raky Sastri on drums, later relocating to Boston in 2008. They released their latest album, titled Having It Out with Melancholy, in 2020.

== History ==
=== Formation and early years (2004–2008) ===
Jaggery was formed in 2004 by singer/songwriter Mali Sastri (known as Singer Mali) and her brother Raky Sastri on drums. The duo had been performing in New York under different names, including The Throes, since 2001. With bassist and guitarist Ziggy Drozdowski, Jaggery released their debut EP, In Lethe, in October 2004. After this, Daniel Schubmehl joined the band as a percussionist, followed by bassist Tony Leva and harpist/guitarist Jesse Sparhawk.

At some point during this time, Raky Sastri left the band and went on to join the Boston-based group You Won't; he continued to make occasional contributions and appearances with Jaggery, including on their debut album Polyhymnia, released in December 2006.

=== Move to Boston, further albums, and Private Violence (2008–2012) ===
In 2008, Sastri relocated to her home town of Boston and has since resided in Cloud Club, a communal housing project for artists in South Boston, which was also occupied for a time by singer Amanda Palmer. Sastri's move was fuelled in part by her association with Palmer and her band The Dresden Dolls, as well as finding more success playing to crowds in Boston; the rest of the band stayed in New York and New Jersey, but would commute to Boston to rehearse at Cloud Club for several days at a time.

Jaggery released their second album, Upon a Penumbra, on July 28, 2010. The majority of the album was recorded by Sastri at Cloud Club.

As part of the RPM Challenge in 2011, the band recorded their third album over the month of February, which they titled Sp(l)ice and released on March 7 of that year. Soon after this, they began recording their EP Private Violence, which would not be released until November 2012; the band has described it as a "concept album" inspired by the novel In Cold Blood by Truman Capote.

=== Live performances and Crux (2014–present) ===
In June 2014, Jaggery performed a show at the American Repertory Theater in Harvard University; this was recorded and later released as a live album titled For the Record. The band was also commissioned by the Museum of Fine Arts, Boston to create a song cycle based on Leonardo da Vinci, which they titled The Beautiful and the Grotesque and performed at the museum's Remis Auditorium on May 1, 2015.

By 2016, the majority of the band members had moved to Boston. On April 29 of that year, Jaggery released their fourth studio album, titled Crux. The album was positively reviewed and described as "genre-defying" and "refreshingly unique".

In the same year, the band recorded their fifth album, titled Having It Out with Melancholy. It was based on a poem cycle of the same name written by Jane Kenyon about depression, and was set to music by Boston-based composer Michael J. Veloso. The album was performed live in its entirety by Jaggery on November 5, 2016; however, it was not released commercially until 2020.

== Music style ==
Jaggery's music style has been described as avant-rock with elements of chamber pop, jazz, classical music, and dark wave, as well as "genre-hopping, performance art rock". In a 2016 interview, Sastri stated that "Jaggery songs tend to land all over the accessibility map." She has described Cyndi Lauper, Björk, Tori Amos and Jeff Buckley as early influences on her musical style.

== Band members ==
=== Current members ===
- Singer Mali (Mali Sastri) – lead vocals, piano, keyboards
- Tanya Phillips – harp
- Tony Leva – upright and electric bass
- Rachel Jayson – viola
- Petaluma Vale – backing vocals, harp
- Daniel Schubmehl – drums, percussion

=== Past members ===
- Raky Sastri – drums, percussion
- Ziggy Drozdowski – bass, bowed guitars
- Jesse Sparhawk – harp, electric guitar
- Maeve Gilchrist – harp
- Jonah Sacks – cello
- Dylan Jack – drums, percussion

== Discography ==
=== Studio albums ===
- Polyhymnia (2006)
- Upon a Penumbra (2010)
- Sp(l)ice (2011)
- Crux (2016)
- Having It Out with Melancholy (2020)

=== EPs ===
- In Lethe EP (2004)
- Private Violence (2012)

=== Live albums ===
- For the Record (2014)

=== Singles ===
- Arabian Dance (2010)
- Coventry Carol (2011)
- The Lobster Quadrille (2014)
