= I Got the Blues =

1971 song performed by The Rolling Stones

Song by the Rolling Stones

from the album Sticky Fingers
- Released: April 23, 1971
- Recorded: March–May 1970
- Genre: Soul blues; blues rock
- Length: 3:53
- Label: Rolling Stones/Virgin
- Songwriter(s): Jagger/Richards
- Producer(s): Jimmy Miller

"I Got the Blues" is a song recorded by the Rolling Stones. Written by Mick Jagger and Keith Richards, it appears on their 1971 album Sticky Fingers. It is a slow-paced, bluesy song featuring languid guitars with heavy blues and soul influences.

== Reception ==
In his review, Richie Unterberger compares the Stones' take on their early influences, saying, "Musically, it's very much in the school of slow Stax ballads, by [Otis] Redding and some others, with slow reverbed guitars with a gospel feel, dignified brass, and a slow buildup of tension." A notable reference point is the Otis Redding-ballad "I've Been Loving You Too Long", a song that the Stones themselves had recorded in 1965 and very similar in style and buildup.

== Recording ==
Recorded during the months of March through May 1970, the song features Mick Jagger on lead vocals, Keith Richards on harmony vocals, Mick Taylor and Richards on guitars, Bill Wyman on bass, Charlie Watts on drums, and Billy Preston on Hammond organ. Stones' recording veterans Bobby Keys and Jim Price performed on the saxophone and trumpet, respectively.
