= Andy Bryant =

American businessman

- Born: 1950 (age 75–76); Mountain Grove, Missouri, U.S.
- Education: University of Missouri; University of Kansas
- Occupations: Chairman, Intel
- Spouse: Nancy
- Children: 2

Andy D. Bryant (born May 1950 in Mountain Grove, Missouri) is the past chairman of the multinational semiconductor company Intel. He joined Intel in 1981 and previously served as the company's vice chairman, chief administrative officer and chief financial officer. He stepped down from his position as chairman of the board in January 2020 with intention of retiring from the board altogether by May 2020. He plans to remain as an executive adviser to the company. Bryant worked out of the company's offices in Hillsboro, Oregon, and lives in Portland. He also serves on the board of directors for McKesson Corporation and Columbia Sportswear.

== Early life ==
After growing up in Independence, Missouri, he earned a degree in economics from the University of Missouri. He completed an MBA from the University of Kansas and then joined the auto industry where he worked for Ford Motor Company and then Chrysler in Detroit, Michigan.
