= Come (American band) =

American alternative rock band

- Come performing at Dingwalls in London, Thursday 23rd May, 2013

Background information
- Origin: Boston, Massachusetts, U.S.
- Genres: Alternative rock, blues rock
- Years active: 1990–2001, 2008, 2010–2011, 2013–present
- Labels: Matador, Sub Pop, Beggars Banquet, Domino, Placebo
- Members: Thalia Zedek; Chris Brokaw; Arthur Johnson; Sean O'Brien
- Past members: Winston Bramen; Daniel Coughlin

Come is an American alternative rock band, formed in Boston by Thalia Zedek (vocals, guitar), Chris Brokaw (guitar, vocals), Arthur Johnson (drums), and Sean O'Brien (bass).

== Band history and reception ==
Come came into being after a mutual acquaintance invited Brokaw, O'Brien, and Johnson to play with him. Brokaw was playing drums with Codeine, Johnson had previously drummed for Athens, Georgia, band Bar-B-Q Killers, and O'Brien had played with two other 1980s Athens bands, Kilkenny Cats and Fashion Battery. After playing one show together, Brokaw, O'Brien, and Johnson decided to split off into their own project and invited Thalia Zedek to join them. Zedek had played in the bands Uzi and Dangerous Birds and had met and befriended Brokaw in the mid-1980s. Her most recent band at the time, the post-no wave New York City band Live Skull, had disbanded in 1990 and Brokaw and Zedek had been talking about playing together.

In 1991, Come released the 12-inch single "Car", a seven-minute epic in the post-punk, blues-noir style of The Birthday Party, These Immortal Souls, and The Gun Club, on Sub Pop. Spin wrote that it "delivers all the satisfaction of... the definitive Hendrix box set." The release encapsulated what was to become Come's trademark style: thematically dark, emotionally intense, and lengthy songs marked by Zedek's distressed vocals, abrupt rhythms, and the tension-filled guitar interplay between Zedek and Brokaw. Even before the release of its first album, the band received critical praise. Spin called the band "ferocious, bending a head-on adrenaline rush into a staggering blues crawl, churning noise-damage into aching melody, and letting it fall apart", adding that Come was "poised on the brink of the big time."

In 1992, Come released its debut album, 11:11, on Matador Records. 11:11 received acclaim from both the independent and established media, with David Browne from Entertainment Weekly characterizing it as "enthralling, like watching someone howl into a rainstorm." After the release of 11:11, Brokaw left Codeine, devoting himself full-time to Come. Come received praise from Dinosaur Jr.'s lead singer J. Mascis, Hüsker Dü's Bob Mould, Chavez's guitarist Matt Sweeney, and Nirvana's frontman Kurt Cobain, among many others, with Indigo Girls' Amy Ray lauding Zedek's voice, describing it as an "old Marlene Dietrich film" Cell guitarist Jerry DiRienzo praised their ability to "[bridge] the masculine and feminine."

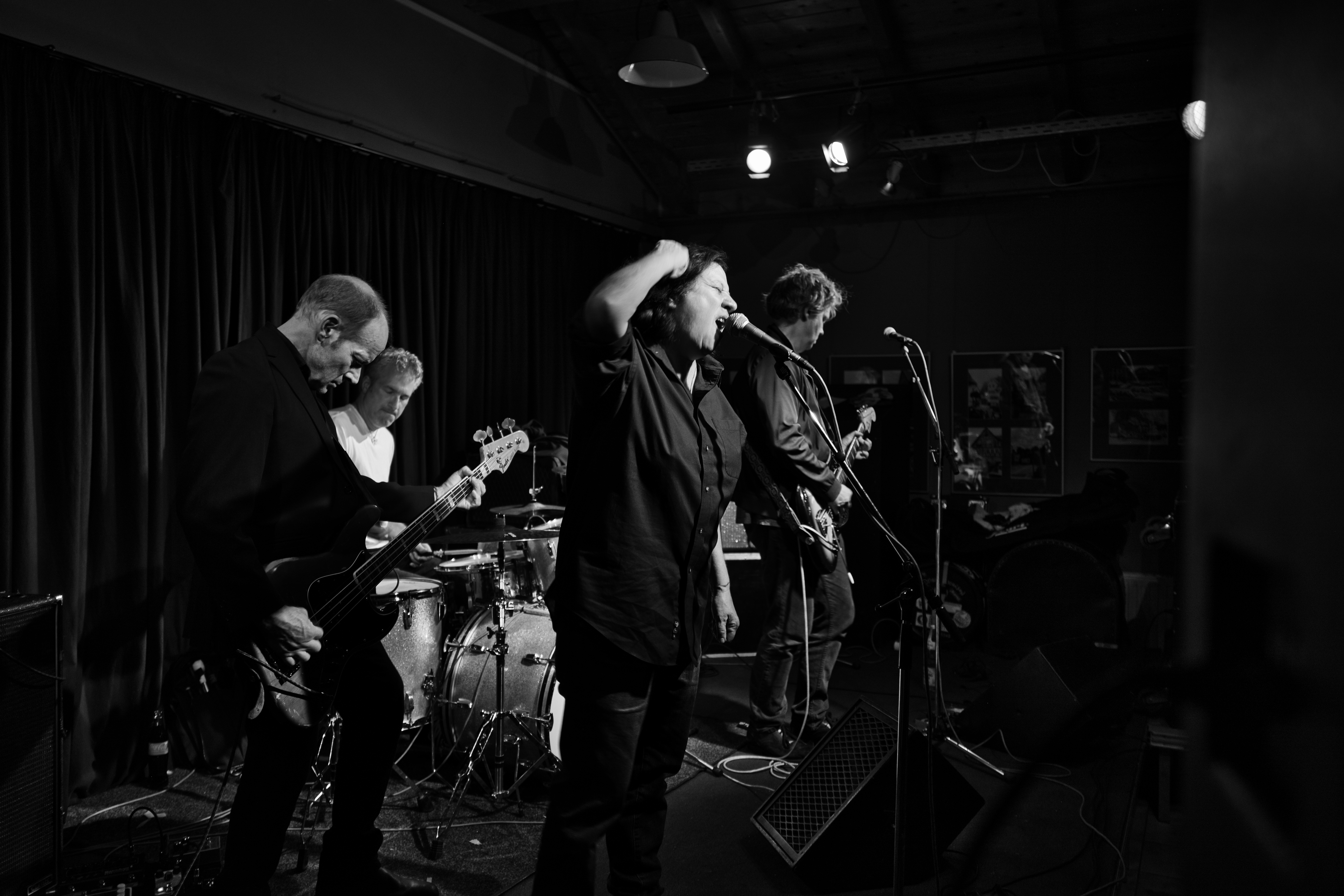
Come at Club W71, Weikersheim 2022

Come's second album, Don't Ask, Don't Tell, was released in 1994. It was calmer than its predecessor but still grave. Among the highlights of the album were the two dark ballads, "Let's Get Lost" and "Arrive," each closing a side of the vinyl edition. Johnson and O'Brien left the band after Don't Ask, Don't Tell to pursue other careers. The next album, the short Near-Life Experience, was recorded with a number of different musicians, including drummer Mac McNeilly of the Jesus Lizard and Bundy K. Brown of Tortoise. In 1998, Come released the 66-minute Gently, Down The Stream, which mirrored the energy of Near Life Experience but featured a more fluent integrated soundscape and included the stand-out track "Saints Around My Neck." Zedek and Brokaw took a break after Gently, Down the Stream and each went on to release multiple solo albums. They performed together on a few occasions to play some Come songs live but never reconvened to create a new album.

Since the start of its unofficial break, Come has performed several reunion gigs. On November 11, 2007, Brokaw and Zedek came together for a two-song set, to celebrate the 20th anniversary of the Middle East Club in Cambridge, which had been the site of Come's last performance. A year later, in November 2008, a full band reunion occurred when the Gently, Down the Stream line-up of the band came together for a one-off performance in Castellón, Spain, as part of that year's Tanned Tin Festival. They performed songs from their entire discography. In 2010 and 2011, the original line-up of Come sporadically re-united to play a number of shows, including a set at the TraniWreck festival in Cambridge, Massachusetts, featuring songs exclusively from its first two albums and the "Car" EP. In early 2013, it was announced that there would be a small international tour with the original band line-up to commemorate the 20th anniversary of 11:11. The tour took place in May and June 2013, in support of the re-issue of Come's debut album.

Throughout its career, Come has supported and toured with Sonic Youth, Nirvana, Sugar, Dinosaur Jr. and many other seminal 1990s rock bands.

== Members ==
- Thalia Zedek – lead vocals, rhythm guitar (1990–2001, 2013–present)
- Chris Brokaw – lead guitar, backing vocals (1990–2001, 2013–present)
- Sean O'Brien – bass (1990–1995, 2013–present)
- Arthur Johnson – drums (1990–1995, 2013–present)

== Discography ==
=== Albums ===
- 11:11 (Matador Records/Placebo, 1992; Reissue: Matador Records, 2013)
- Don't Ask, Don't Tell (Matador Records/Beggars Banquet Records, 1994; Reissue: Fire Records, 2021)
- Near-Life Experience (Matador Records/Domino Records, 1996)
- Gently, Down the Stream (Matador Records/Domino Records, 1998)
- Peel Sessions (Fire Records, 2022)

=== Singles ===
- "Car" - 7" (Sub Pop, 1991) featuring "Car"* and "Last Mistake"* (August installment of Sub Pop's Singles Club)
- "Car" - 12"/CD (Sub Pop, 1991) featuring "Car,"* "Last Mistake,"* and "Submerge"* (original pre-album version)
- "Fast Piss Blues" - 7" (Matador Records/Placebo, 1992) featuring "Fast Piss Blues" and "I Got the Blues"
- "Fast Piss Blues" - 10"/CD (Matador Records/Placebo, 1992) featuring "Fast Piss Blues," "I Got the Blues," and "Brand New Vein"
- "Wrong Side" - 7"/CD (Matador Records/Beggars Banquet Records, 1994) featuring "Wrong Side," "Loin of the Surf"* (cover of Swell Maps), and "SVK"* (note: SVK is short for "Sharon Vs Karen")
- "In/Out" - 7" (Matador Records, 1994) featuring "In/Out" and "Yr Reign" (limited edition promo vinyl)
- "String" - 10" (Matador Records/Beggars Banquet Records, 1995) featuring "String," "Who Jumped In My Grave,"* "German Song,"* and "Angelhead"*
- "String" - CD (Matador Records/Beggars Banquet Records, 1995) featuring "String," "German Song,"* "Fast Piss Blues," and "City Of Fun (Peel Session)"* (BBC radio session cover of The Only Ones)
- "Secret Number" - 10"/CD (Matador Records/Domino Records, 1996) featuring "Secret Number," "Prize,"* and "Hurricane II"* (piano version of Near-Life Experience's opening track)
- "Preaching the Blues B/W Sex Beat" - (Chunklet, 2021) attributed to "Come (AKA the Come Club)," an homage to The Gun Club, who originally recorded both songs

(* indicates track unavailable on any Come album)

=== Contributions to compilations ===
- "Car" on Afternoon Delight!: Love Songs From Sub Pop (Sub Pop, 1992)
- "Orbit" on Altered States Of America (Lime Lizard, 1993)
- "Fast Piss Blues" on Independent ^{20} Volume 16 (Beechwood Music, 1993)
- "Fast Piss Blues" on The Beggars Banquet Collection (Beggars Banquet Records, 1993)
- "City of Fun" (BBC radio Peel session cover of The Only Ones) on Volume Eight Compilation (Volume, England, 1993)
- "Submerge" on The Day We Killed Grunge (Caroline Records, 1994)
- "In/Out" on Cortex Sampler (Cortex, 1994)
- "Wrong Side" on Play It! Vol. 3 (PIAS Benelux, 1994)
- "Wrong Side" on Rough Trade: Music For The 90's, Vol. 6 (Rough Trade, 1994)
- "String" on The Day We Exhumed Disco (Caroline Records, 1994)
- "String" on Menú (Everlasting Records, 1995)
- "Off to One Side" on This Is Fort Apache (MCA, 1995)
- "Cimarron"* (recorded Jul-1995) on Ain't Nuthin' But a She Thing (London Records, 1995)
- "Weak as the Moon" on Audio Compilation (Audio Magazine [Greece], 1996)
- "Brand New Vein (radio session)"* (recorded 17-Sept-1991) on Pipeline! Live Boston Rock on WMBR (Kimchee, 1996)
- "In/Out" and "Strike"* (recorded Nov-1995) on What's Up Matador (Matador Records, 1997)
- "Madroad Driving..."* (with Johnny Depp) on Kerouac: Kicks Joy Darkness (Rykodisc, 1997)
- "Hurricane II" on Hits Hurt (Domino, 1997)
- "Recidivist" on The Sell Texas To Mexico Fund-Raising CD (Matador, 1997)
- "String" on Twenty-one Years Of Beggars Banquet Records (PIAS/Beggars Banquet, 1998)
- "Hurricane (acoustic radio session)"* (recorded Mar-1998) on Drinking From Puddles: A Radio History Compilation (Kill Rock Stars, 1999)
- "Do You Love Me?"* (recorded Oct-1999) on Knitting On The Roof - Songs from 'Fiddler On The Roof (Knitting Factory, 1999) (Voice & Clarinet: Thalia Zedek, Voice & Guitar – Chris Brokaw)
- "I Got The Blues" on Gimme Shelter Vol. 1 (Uncut Magazine, 2002)
- "Fast Piss Blues," "String," and "New Coat (live)"* (recorded 1999) on the Matador At 21 box-set (Matador, 2010)

(* indicates track unavailable on any Come album or single)

=== Non-album tracks ===
- "Car"
- "Last Mistake"
- "Submerge" (original pre-album version)
- "Brand New Vein" (radio session)
- "SVK"
- "Loin of the Surf" (Swell Maps cover)
- "City Of Fun" [Peel Session] (The Only Ones cover)
- "Who Jumped In My Grave"
- "Angelhead"
- "Cimarron"
- "Strike"
- "Prize"
- "Hurricane II" (piano version)
- "Hurricane" (acoustic radio session)
- "Madroad Driving..." (with Johnny Depp)
- "Do You Love Me?"
- "New Coat" (live)
- "Clockface" (live)

== Music videos ==
- "Car" (1991) Directed by Julie Hardin
- "Submerge" (1992) Directed by Jesse Peretz
- "String" (1994) Directed by Sadie Benning
- "In/Out" (1994) Co-directed by Julie Hardin and Amanda P. Cole
- "German Song" (1995) Directed by Sadie Benning
- "Cimarron" (1995) Directed by Sophie Muller
