= Thalia Zedek =

American musician (born 1956)

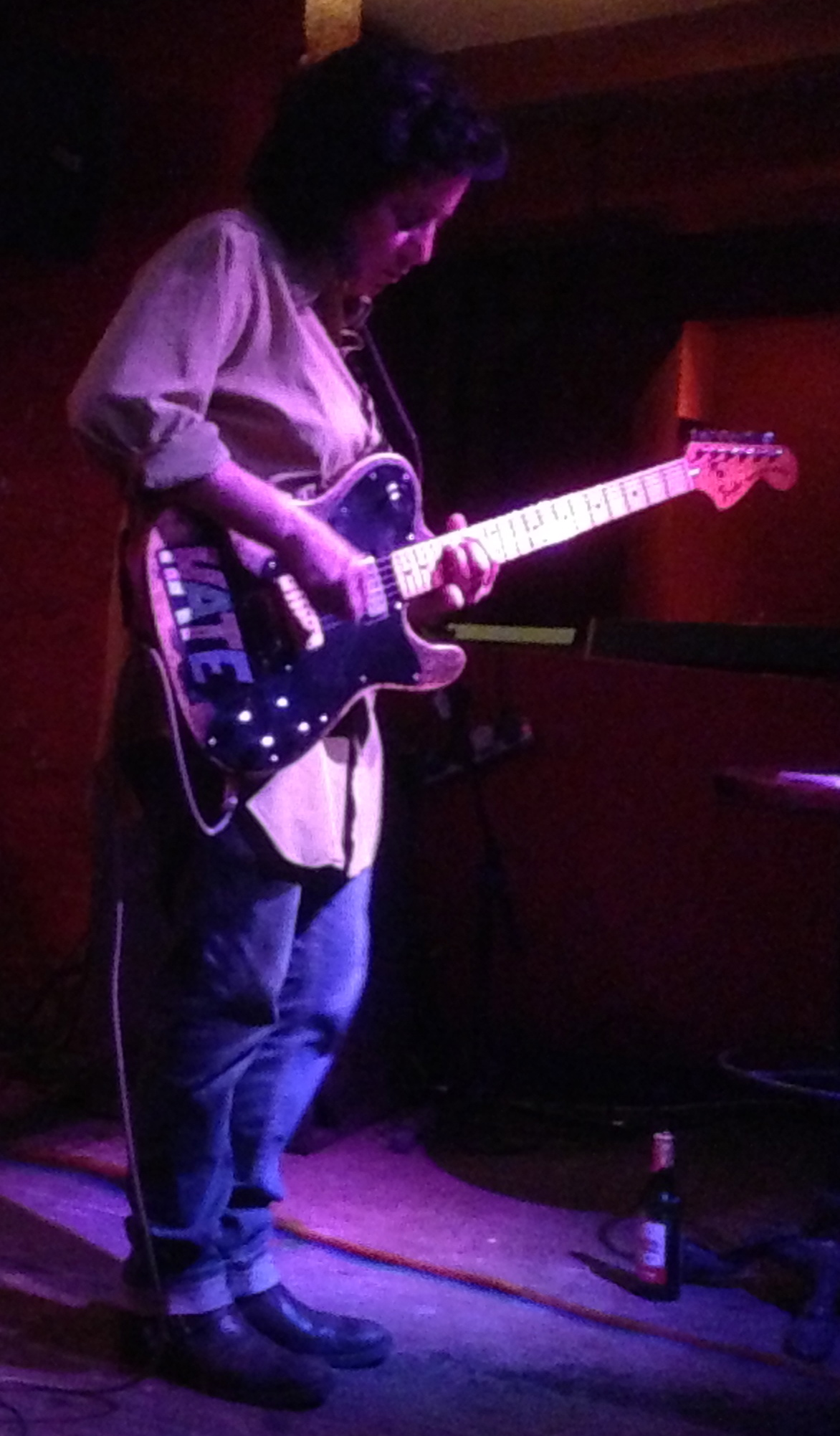
- Thalia Zedek live at the Buffalo Bar (London) on June 13, 2013

Background information
- Born: 1961 (age 64–65); Washington, D.C., United States
- Genres: Indie rock
- Years active: 1980–present
- Labels: Kimchee Records, Matador, Thrill Jockey, Low Transit Industries
- Member of: Dangerous Birds, Uzi, Live Skull, Come, Thalia Zedek Band

Thalia Zedek (born 1961) is an American singer and guitarist. Active since the early 1980s, she has been a member of several notable alternative rock groups, including Live Skull and Uzi both of which, according to Spin magazine, "made big noise in the underground", and Come. Critic Heather Phares writes that Zedek's music can be defined by "the permanent, aching rasp in her voice, her guitar's bluesy bite, the startlingly clear-eyed lyrics about life and loss."

== Biography ==
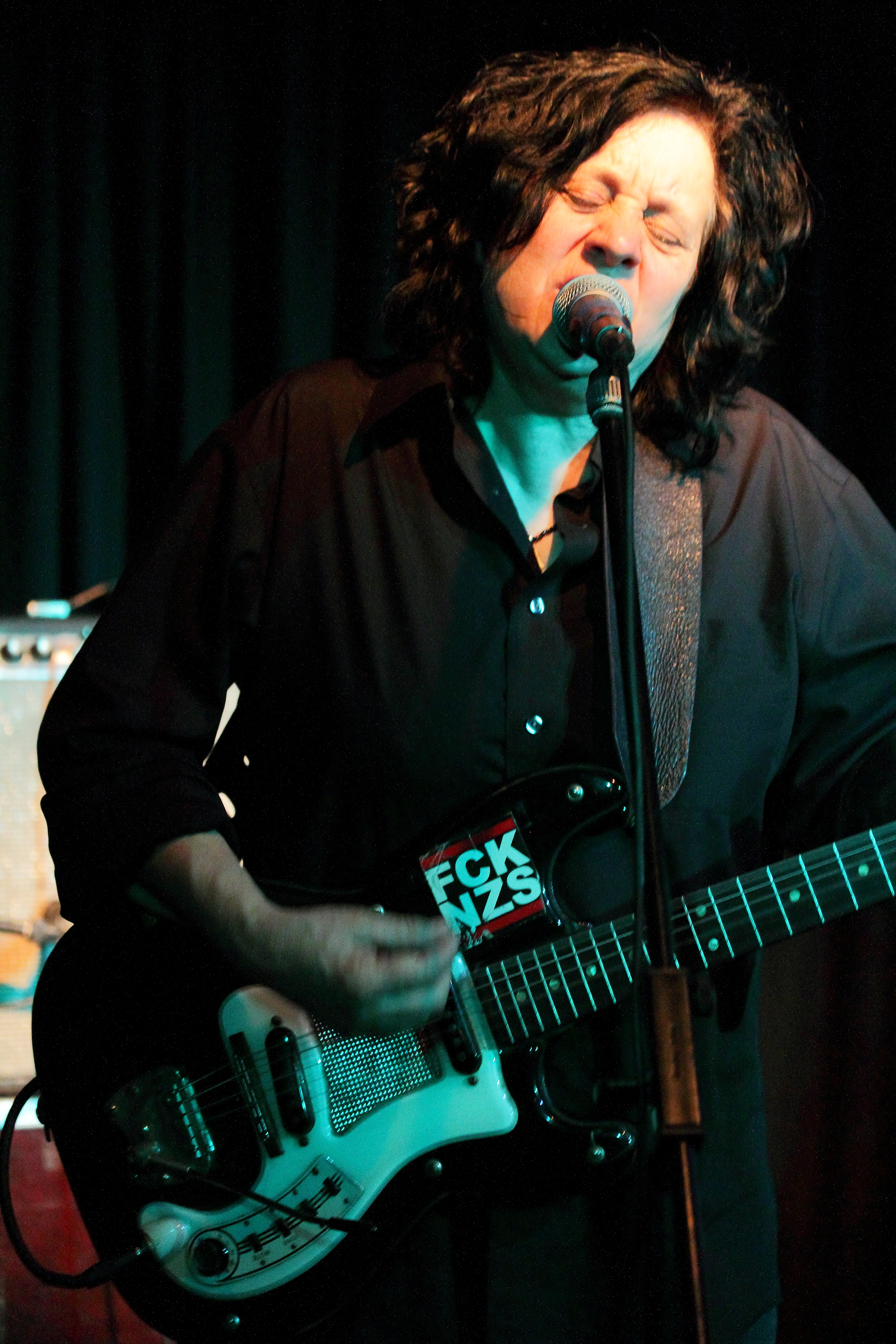
Thalia Zedek Band at Club W71, Weikersheim 2019

Zedek grew up in a Jewish family in the metropolitan area of Washington, D.C. She attended Springbrook High School in Maryland, where she played clarinet in the marching band under band director Charles Sickafus. The early punk era of the late 1970s in which she came of age, and in particular Patti Smith, contributed deeply to the formation of her musical aesthetic. While still at high school, she would travel to New York City with her brother, Dan Zedek, to see Smith perform.

Zedek moved to Boston in 1979, attending Boston University for one semester before deciding to pursue a musical career instead. Her first band, the all-female White Women, broke up after a couple of years, and she formed the Dangerous Birds. This group had somewhat more success, including a single, "Smile on Your Face/Alpha Romeo", which achieved airplay on college and alternative-commercial radio; but Zedek wanted a more "violent" sound in contrast to the somewhat "girlie pop" tendencies of her Dangerous Birds bandmates. Her next project, Uzi, worked towards this aim, producing an EP, Sleep Asylum. The EP was characterized by elusive yet subtly menacing lyrics superimposed upon lugubrious but driving instrumental tracks, featuring layers of dense, murky yet muscular guitar arrangements, blended with heady synthesizer and tape effects. However, despite the promise of "Sleep Asylum", Uzi dissolved, owing to tension between Zedek and the band's drummer, Danny Lee.

She next took the role of primary vocalist for New York City's Live Skull, a band already well established. While the album Dusted, the first product of this collaboration, reflected an intense synergy between Zedek's vocal style and the complexly histrionic instrumental work of Live Skull, the follow-up Positraction floundered, and Live Skull also disbanded, due to conflicts, in 1990. Zedek soon co-founded Come, with Codeine drummer and guitarist Chris Brokaw. It was with them that she had her biggest successes, releasing four albums before the group disbanded in 2001. In that same year, she also released Been Here and Gone, her first solo project. Since then she has released six further full-length solo albums and several EPs.

Zedek was also a participant in the 1998 Suffragette Sessions tour, organized by the Indigo Girls. In 2006, she performed at North East Sticks Together.

In spite of commercial success, Zedek has been acclaimed by music critics throughout her career, and has been influential within the indie-rock realm, particularly through her influence within the prolific Boston indie scene, which has spawned many noteworthy artists. She is an "out-and-proud lesbian".

== Discography ==
=== Thalia Zedek Band ===
==== Albums ====
- Been Here and Gone (Matador, July 31, 2001; Thrill Jockey, forthcoming 2021 on vinyl)
- Hell is in Hello (Return To Sender, August 2, 2004) Limited edition of 2000 copies
- Trust Not Those in Whom Without Some Touch of Madness (Thrill Jockey, September 14, 2004)
- Liars and Prayers (Thrill Jockey, April 22, 2008; Low Transit Industries, 2008)
- Via (Thrill Jockey, March 19, 2013)
- Eve (Thrill Jockey, August 19, 2016)
- Fighting Season (Thrill Jockey, September 21, 2018)
- Perfect Vision (Thrill Jockey, August 27, 2021)
- The Boat Outside Your Window (Thrill Jockey, May 23, 2025)

==== EPs ====
- You're a Big Girl Now (Acuarela/Kimchee Records, 2002) CD only
- The Nature of Drones (Self-released, 2005) 7-song, 35-minute CD-R EP, home-recorded and self-released exclusively for the July 2005 Australian tour (remaining copies were available only through Thrill Jockey Mail Order). It contains four songs, one cover ("House of the Rising Sun") and two re-workings of older work ("Evil Hand", "JJ85").
- SIX (Thrill Jockey, February 24, 2014) Six-song, 29 minute EP (CD and limited LP) including a cover of Freakwater's "Flathand"

==== Live ====
- Live at Tonic, NYC 1/16/2000 (Self-released, 2000)

=== E ===
- E (Thrill Jockey, 2016)
- Negative Work (Thrill Jockey, 2018)
- Complications (Thrill Jockey, 2020)
- Any Information EP (Self-released, 2022) limited edition of 335 copies on vinyl
- Living Waters (Silver Rocket, 2024)
