= Victory at Sea (band) =

American indie rock band

- Origin: Boston, Massachusetts, United States
- Genres: Indie rock
- Years active: 1996–2007
- Past members: Mona Elliott; Mel Lederman; Christina Files; Fin Moore; Carl Eklof; Dave Norton

Victory at Sea was an American indie rock band formed in 1996, from members of bands the Swirlies and Spore, in the Boston, Massachusetts region. It consisted of vocalist/guitarist Mona Elliott, and drummer Christina Files. They added bassist Mel Lederman shortly after forming. Christina Files exited the band later to be replaced by a succession of drummers Fin Moore, Carl Eklof, and Dave Norton. Violinist/guitarist Taro Hatanaka joined the band for their most recent albums Memories Fade and All Your Things Are Gone which were released by the independent record label Gern Blandsten Records in 2004 and 2006 respectively. On September 6, 2007, the band announced on their Myspace page that they had disbanded, though they stated that all of the members have new musical endeavors. Elliott later played with former Metal Hearts member Anar Badalov as Travels, now disbanded.

== Discography ==
- Easier Than Living (EP 1998) (Villa Villakula)
- The Dark Is Just the Night (1999) (Slowdime Records)
- Helms & Victory At Sea (Split EP with Helms, 2000) (Kimchee Records)
- Carousel (2001) (Kimchee Records)
- The Good Night (2002) (Kimchee Records)
- Memories Fade (2004) (Gern Blandsten Records)
- All Your Things Are Gone (2006) (Gern Blandsten Records)
