= Chris Brokaw =

American musician (born 1964)

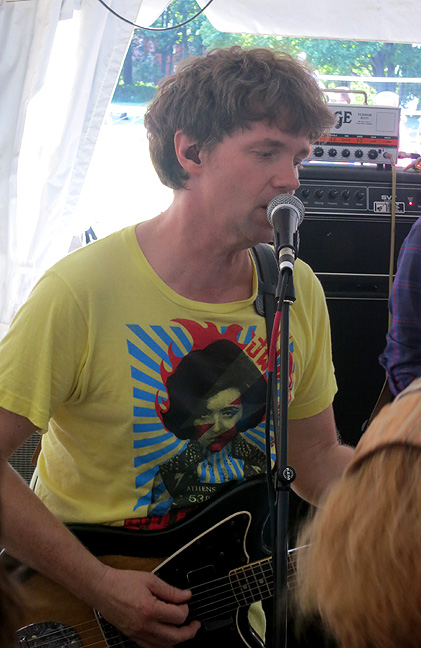
- Chris Brokaw performing with The Lemonheads in Boston 2014

Background information
- Born: Christopher Jon Brokaw; August 1, 1964 (age 62); New York City, U.S.
- Genres: Alternative rock, slowcore, post-rock, folk, experimental
- Occupation: Musician
- Instruments: Vocals, guitar, drums, whistling
- Years active: 1989–present

Chris Brokaw (born August 1, 1964) is an American musician, best known for his work with the bands Come and Codeine.

== Life and career ==
Christopher Jon Brokaw was born in New York City and raised in both the city and Scarsdale, New York. He started playing drums and guitar as a preteen.

While studying at Oberlin College, Brokaw met many people who became figures on the American indie rock scene of the 1990s, among them Stephen Immerwahr, with whom Brokaw formed Codeine, as well as Sooyoung Park of Bitch Magnet and Seam, John McEntire of Tortoise, and Liz Phair.

Soon after graduating from Oberlin. Brokaw moved to Boston, Massachusetts, and then Seattle, Washington in 2011.

He played drums for a number of bands, including 7 Or 8 Worm Hearts and G.G. Allin. He then joined Codeine and played drums on their first two studio albums, as well as helping to kick-start Liz Phair's career. In 1990 he returned to the guitar, one of his two main instruments, and teamed up with Thalia Zedek (Dangerous Birds, Uzi, Live Skull), a well-known figure in New York's post-no wave scene. The two formed Come, a band that never gained much mainstream popularity, despite the critical praise they garnered throughout their career.

Brokaw and Zedek took a break from Come at the end of the decade, and the band never regrouped in the studio. However, Brokaw and Zadek have since performed together on many occasions in a variety of contexts. In November 2008 Come convened for one performance at the Tanned Tin Festival in Spain.

After Come, Brokaw has released several albums in his own name, from the instrumental Post-Rock of Red Cities, through the composition and performance of the musical score for "i was born, but...", to the powerful rock-pop song structure of Incredible Love and Gambler's Ecstasy. Both Brokaw and Zedek were invited to participate in a limited edition series of albums by Normal Records, a German record label. Brokaw recorded his contribution to the series, Wandering As Water, in a single day, playing all instruments on the record.

Additionally, Brokaw has played in the bands Pullman, Rivulets, Consonant, and The New Year and played as accompanist to such artists as Thurston Moore, Evan Dando, Steve Wynn, Fan Modine, Christina Rosenvinge, Alan Licht, and Rhys Chatham. Brokaw also participated as drummer 10 in the Boredoms 77 Boadrum performance which took place on July 7, 2007 at the Empire-Fulton Ferry State Park in Brooklyn, New York. In addition to this, Brokaw was one of the guitarists performing Rhys Chatham's A Crimson Grail at the Lincoln Center, New York, as part of the center's Out of Doors series on September 14, 2010. The performance was a 200-guitar version of Chatham's work, which was commissioned by the city of Paris and premiered at the basilica of Sacré-Coeur in 2005, originally scored for 400 guitars.

Between 2005 and 2006, Brokaw performed with the Chris Brokaw Band, which included Karate's Jeff Goddard on bass and Rodan's Kevin Coultas on drums. Later, in 2011, Brokaw would perform again under the same moniker with Elisha Wiesner and Sal Esposito, both formerly of Kahoots, on bass and drums respectively. In 2007, Brokaw formed Dirtmusic with Chris Eckman (Walkabouts) and Hugo Race (Nick Cave and the Bad Seeds). Named after Tim Winton's 2001 novel Dirt Music, the band released their homonymous debut album on Glitterhouse Records in November 2007. In 2008, Dirtmusic performed at The Festival in the Desert, in Essakane, Mali, where they met the Touareg band Tamikrest, in collaboration with whom they would record they following album, BKO. BKO, their second album, was recorded in January 2009 at Ali Farka Touré's old studio in Bamako, Mali, and was released the following year.

Brokaw formed his own record label, CAPITAN RECORDS, in 2008, through which he has released several solo albums of predominantly instrumental music (Canaris and Gracias, Ghost of the Future), in addition to his collaboration with Wrekmeister Harmonies, Live in NYC. Stemming from Brokaw's many musical projects and his enviable work ethic, DigBoston has called him "one of the most prolific and active artists to call Boston home." Likewise, The Irish News has stated that "Chris Brokaw is one of America's busiest musical talents."

== Soundtracks and scores ==
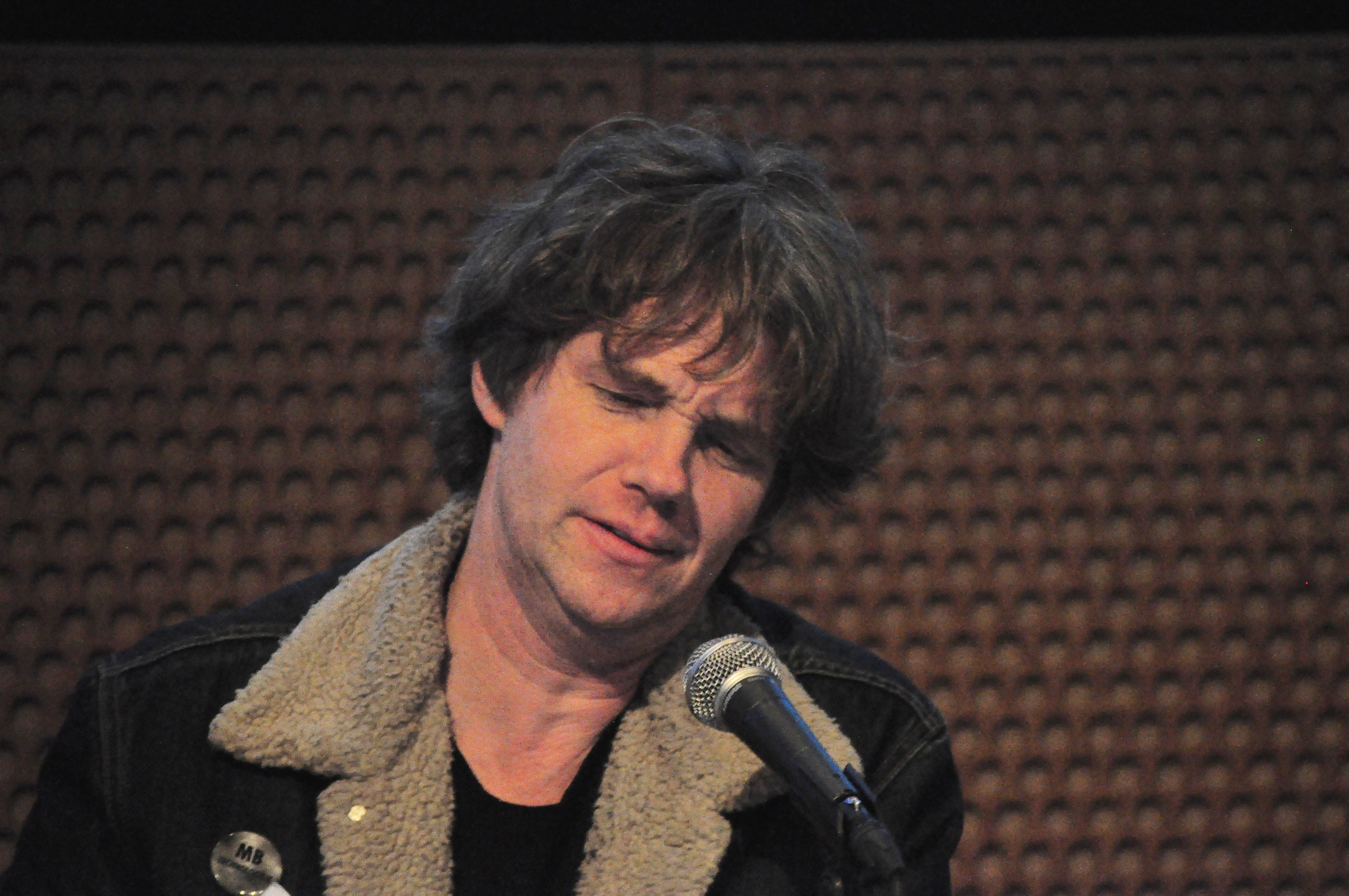
Brokaw at the 2014 Pop Conference at the EMP Museum, Seattle, Washington.

Brokaw has provided music for productions of two dance companies: the Daghdha Dance Company (Limerick, Ireland), where Nicole Peisl commissioned him to create new pieces, and Kino Dance (Boston), where he collaborated with playwright Rinde Eckert and director Robert Woodruff on Highway Ulysses, which in 2003 The Boston Globe named "the best production of the year."

Brokaw has also scored Roddy Bogawa's 2004 documentary "i was born, but..." and Leslie McCleave's 2005 feature film Road, which won him the Best Original Score award at the Brooklyn International Film Festival.

Furthermore, he scored Roddy Bogawa's 2011 documentary Taken by Storm: The Art of Storm Thorgerson and Hipgnosis, for which he is also credited as co-producer. More recently, he has—with Animal Hospital's Kevin Micka—scored Lana Z Caplan's 2011 experimental documentary Sospira and Jason Cortlund's 2012 feature film Now, Forager: A Film About Love & Fungi. Brokaw also contributed a soundtrack to Holly Anderson's collection of flash fiction and mesostic poetry The Night She Slept With a Bear (2012).

He has also contributed a song to the original soundtrack to the German sci-fi thriller film Centerland, directed by Enko Landmanns. In 2017, he composed the score to Julia Halperin and Jason Cortlund's independent feature film La Barracuda, which was nominated for the SXSW Gamechanger Award and the SXSW Grand Jury Award. Also in 2017, Brokaw wrote the score to Nick Frangione's film Buck Run, starring James Le Gros, which had its world premiere at the 2019 Palm Springs International Film Festival. Regarding Brokaw's score, Variety commented that "[t]he drifting electric guitar of Chris Brokaw’s score further amplifies a timelessly melancholy air."

In 2018, he contributed -with Claudia Groom, under the moniker The Fly Aways- the original song "I'm The Only One For You" to the soundtrack for Derek Johnson's psychological-thriller Mother's Garden, starring Eryn Rea.

Since 2013, Danish guitar pedal manufacturer Reuss has been developing, with Brokaw's input, prototypes for a pedal named CB-01 Recidivist, after the Come song from their final album Gently, Down the Stream. It eventually was made commercially available in a limited edition in February 2021.

Of late, Brokaw has been collaborating with Findlay//Sandsmark, a performance company working based in Norway which creates dance, theater, video art, and live music performances. Findlay//Sandsmark and Brokaw have been developing a new multimedia piece, provisionally entitled "Florida (lowlands)," which they are scheduled to perform in November 2021 in Kansas City. The piece was originally debuted in March 2019 at Rimi/Imir SceneKunst in Stavanger, Norway, as well as at the Oslo Internasjonale Teaterfestival 2019.

== Collaborations and session work ==
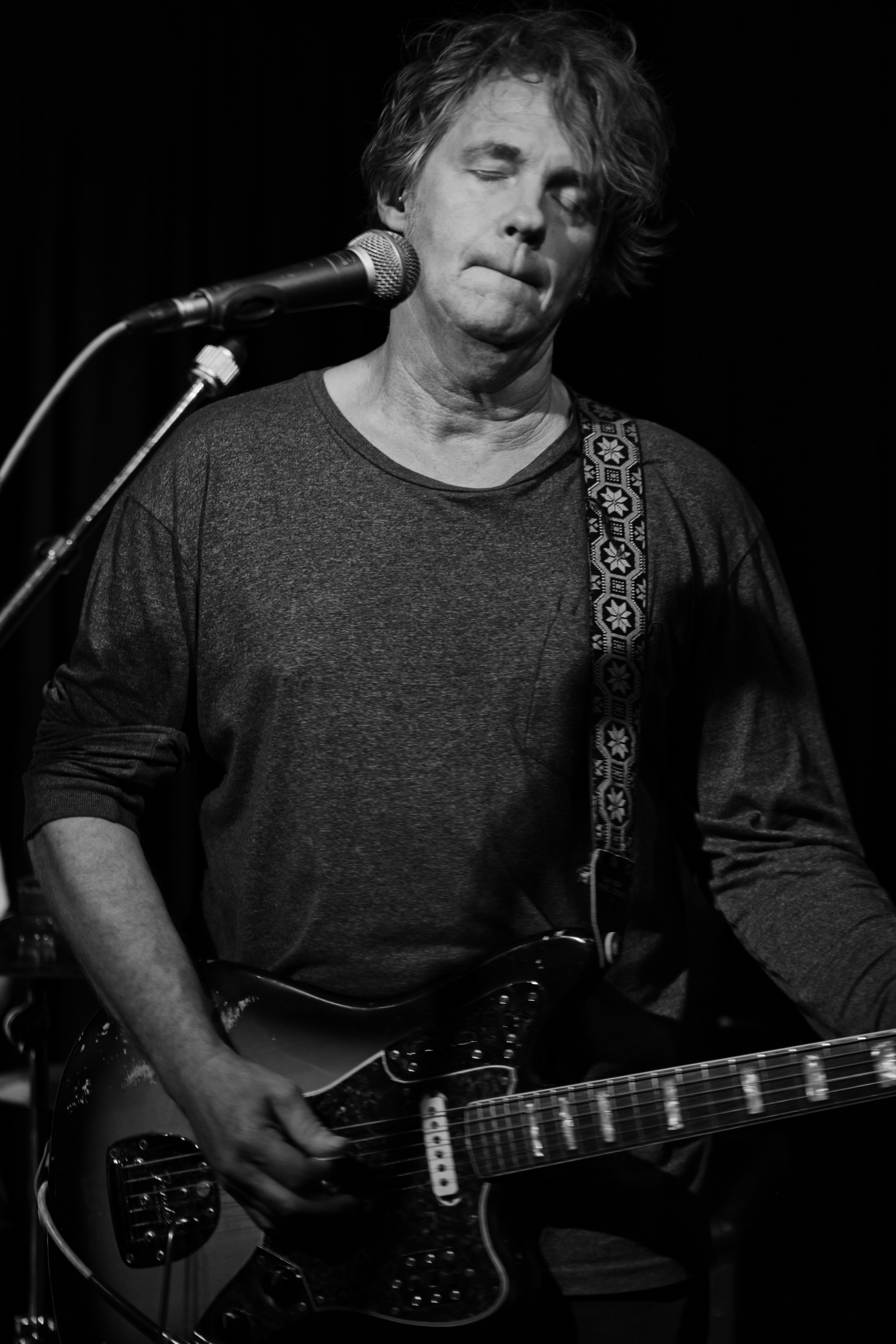
Chris Brokaw with Come at Club W71, Weikersheim 2022

Brokaw has been a member of several bands over the years, most importantly Come and Codeine, though the list includes The New Year, Empty House Cooperative, Consonant, Dirtmusic, Hidden Tooth, Martha's Vineyard Ferries, Pullman, and GG Allin's solo band. Aside from his collaborations with Geoff Farina, Ryley Walker, Jeff Barsky, Holly Anderson, David Michael Curry, and Kevin Mikka, and split EPs with Bastro during his tenure in Codeine and Viva Las Vegas as a solo artist, Brokaw has worked with a number of bands and recording artists, including Cobra Verde, Dave Derby and the Norfolk Downs, Tamikrest, Evan Dando, Fifty Bucks, Gramercy Arms, Jumbo, Tara Jane O'Neil, Hugo Race, The Jeffrey Lee Pierce Sessions Project, Kahoots, Karate, Lemonheads, Loog, Manta Ray, Molasses, 7 Or 8 Worm Hearts, Bedhead, Thurston Moore, Rhys Chatham, Rivulets, Christina Rosenvinge, Rosa Chance Well, Snares and Kites, Via Tania/Tania Bowers, The Boredoms, Willard Grant Conspiracy, and Wrekmeister Harmonies, as well as some of Thalia Zedek's and Steve Wynn's respective solo work, to name but a few.

Brokaw has also begun a musical collaboration with Mark Morgan on guitar, Greg Kelley on trumpet, and Brokaw himself on drums and bass. They perform under the name Dark Money and they recorded and mixed their first batch of music at Oddfellows in Weymouth, MA, in October 2021.

He has been asked to play drums on Dan Burton and Chris Carothers' new record. Burton and Carothers have been making music under the name Ativin since 1994. They convened to work on the new material in New Orleans in August 2021 and plan to go into the studio in December 2021 in Chicago with the help of audio engineer Steve Albini.

== Discography ==
=== Solo ===
- Chris Brokaw & Viva Las Vegas EP (Kimchee Records/Acuarela Records, 2002) Split release with Viva Las Vegas
- Red Cities (12xu, 2002)
- Wandering as Water (Return to Sender, 2003)
- My Confidante+3 EP (Normal Records, 2004)
- Incredible Love (12xu, 2005)
- Forestry EP (I and Ear, 2007) 7" vinyl only, limited to 500 copies
- Canaris (Capitan Records, 2008) CD only; reissued on vinyl by Omentum Records in 2017
- Gracias, Ghost of the Future (Capitan Records, 2009) Vinyl only, limited to 100 copies
- VDSQ Solo Acoustic Volume 3 (Vin du Select Qualitite, 2010)
- Tundra (Capitan Records, 2010) CD only, limited to 40 numbered copies
- I Ace Sociopathic King (Already Dead Tapes, 2011) Cassette only, limited to 200 copies. Reissued in 2014 for Cassette Store Day.
- Live at Porchlight (Capitan Records, March 2011) CDR, limited to 22 copies
- Stories EP (Limited Appeal Records, 2012)
- Gambler's Ecstasy (12xu/Damnably, 2012)
- Tidal Mud (Robert & Leopold, 2012) CD, limited to 20 copies; cassette, limited to 100 copies
- The Coyote of Deadhorse Canyon (Capitan Records, 2013) Cassette only, limited to 49 copies
- With My Little Eye EP (Fear of Speed, 2013) CD only, limited to 150 copies
- Avalanche EP (Mouca, 2013) Cassette only
- Chambers of Light (Capitan Records, 2013) Cassette only, limited to 25 copies
- Macanudo Avenues (Capitan Records, 2013) Cassette only, limited to 25 copies
- Jukers Junction (Capitan Records, 2013) Cassette only, limited to 25 copies
- Solo (Capitan Records, 2013) Cassette only, limited to 20 copies
- Wages of Fear (Capitan Records, 2014) Cassette only, limited to 12 copies, each with handmade collages
- The Periscope Twins (12XU, 2015) Vinyl only, double LP
- The Hand That Wrote This Letter (Capitan Records, 2017) CD only, featuring classical guitar renditions of David Bowie and Prince songs
- End of the Night (VDSQ Records, 2019) LP (tak:til, 2019) CD
- Puritan (12XU, 2020) LP
- Four Kings (Jellyfant Records, forthcoming 2024) Double LP, includes Tundra EP, Tidal Mud and the previously unreleased "Central District Blues"
- Title TK (Crack'd Rabbit, forthcoming 2024) CD only, limited edition, ambient music

=== Original soundtracks ===
- "i was born, but..." - Original Film Score (Atavistic/12xu, 2004)
- Road Original Film Score (Jellyfant Records, 2011) Vinyl only, limited to 300 copies
- Sospira Original Film Score [with Kevin Micka] (Capitan Records, 2011) Limited to 100 copies
- The Night She Slept With a Bear [with Holly Anderson] (Jank Editions, 2012 on CD; Jellyfant, 2017 on vinyl) Book with soundtrack
- Now, Forager Original Film Score (Dais Records, 2014) LP only
- Music For Peter Hutton (Tape Drift Records, 2019) CDR only, containing live film scores

=== With Codeine ===
- Frigid Stars LP (Glitterhouse, 1990)
- Barely Real EP (Sub Pop, 1992)
- Dessau LP (Numero, 2022) [Originally recorded in 1992]

=== With Come ===
Chris Brokaw performing live with Come in at Dingwalls in London, 23rd May 2013

- 11:11 (Matador Records/Placebo, 1992)
- Don't Ask, Don't Tell (Matador Records/Beggars Banquet Records, 1994)
- Near-Life Experience (Matador Records/Domino Records, 1996)
- Gently, Down The Stream (Matador Records/Domino Records, 1998)

=== With Pullman ===
- Turnstyles & Junkpiles (Thrill Jockey, 1998)
- Viewfinder (Thrill Jockey, 2001)

=== With Snares & Kites ===
- Tricks of Trapping (Inbetweens Records, 1999)

=== With The New Year ===
- Newness Ends (Touch & Go Records, 2001)
- The End Is Near (Touch & Go Records, 2004)
- The New Year (Touch & Go Records, 2008)
- Snow (Undertow Music, 2017)

=== With Empty House Cooperative ===
- Improvisational Preparation For Church Studio Recording (Self-released, 2001)
- Half the Mixes from Nine Rectory Lane (Self-released, 2001)
- Improvisational Dinner Music at Middle East Restaurant (Hinah, 2001)
- Improvisational Music (Hinah, 2001)
- Painted Plane (Sedimental, 2004)

=== With Consonant ===
- Consonant (Fenway Recordings, 2002)
- Love and Affliction (Fenway Recordings, 2003)

=== With Dirtmusic ===
- Dirtmusic (Glitterhouse Records, 2007)
- In the Desert (Glitterhouse Records, 2008)
- BKO [with Tamikrest] (Glitterhouse Records, 2010)
- The Tent Sessions [with Tamikrest] (Glitterhouse Records, 2010) Limited to 1000 copies

=== With Wrekmeister Harmonies ===
- Live in NYC (Capitan Records, May 2009) LP only, limited to 100 copies

=== With Chris Brokaw & Geoff Farina ===
- The Angel's Message to Me (Capitan Records/Damnably/Jellyfant, 2010)
- The Boarder's Door (Damnably, 2010)
- All Out & Down (Landland ≠ Record Label, 2016) Vinyl with digital download card. Also limited tour pressing in numbered edition of 125

=== With Martha's Vineyard Ferries ===
- In the Pond 12" EP (Sick Room Records, 2010) 4-song, one-sided 12" vinyl w/ an etching by Rosemary Hoeft on side B, limited to 500 copies
- MASS. GRAVE (Kiam Records, 2013)
- Suns Out Guns Out (Ernest Jenning Record Co., 2021)

=== With Hidden Tooth (w/David Michael Curry) ===
- Lost Records (Capitan Records, 2010) CD only, limited to 100 copies
- Hidden Tooth EP (Robert & Leopold, 2012) 3-inch CD only, limited to 52 copies
- Break the House (Capitan Records, 2013) Cassette only, limited to 25 copies
- Bicoastal Arsonistas (Fear of Speed, 2013) CD only, limited to 100 copies

=== As Ryley Walker & Chris Brokaw ===
- AM 982 "Strangled Pairs" Vol. Thirteen (American Tapes, 2014) One-sided LP, vinyl only, limited to 100 copies

=== As Sunset to the Sea (w/Jeff Barsky) ===
- Sunset to the Sea (Tape Drift Records, 2016) TD81/C60, cassette only
- LOT COP. (Tape Drift Records, 2022) cassette only, limited edition of 50 copies

=== With Charnel Ground (w/James McNew and Kid Millions) ===
- Charnel Ground (12XU, 2018) LP

=== With The Lemonheads ===
- Varshons (The End Records, 2009)
- Varshons II (Fire Records, 2019)

== See also ==
- Stephen Immerwahr
- Come
- Codeine
