= Direct Hit =

Direct Hit may refer to:

- Direct Hit Technologies, a Boston-based search engine company acquired by Ask Jeeves in January 2000
- Direct Hit Records, a record label and store based in Dallas, Texas
- Direct Hit (film), a 1994 film starring William Forsythe
- Direct Hit (band), a Milwaukee-based punk rock band
- Direct Hit, a single from the album It's a Bit Complicated by British band Art Brut

== See also ==
- DirectHit, a pharmacodiagnostic test used to determine the tumor sensitivity or resistance to drug regimens
- "Direct Hit! Operation Dead Ball", an episode of the 1977-1980 Japanese animated television series Lupin III Part II
- Direct Hits (disambiguation)
- The Best of Collin Raye: Direct Hits, country singer Collin Raye's first greatest hits album
