= Incredible Love =

Studio album by Chris Brokaw
- Released: October 25, 2005
- Recorded: March–September 2004
- Genre: Alternative rock
- Length: 35.40
- Labels: 12XU; Rock Action Records; Acuarela Discos; I And Ear (2008 vinyl release)
- Producer: Paul Q. Kolderie

Chris Brokaw chronology
My Confidante+3 EP (2004)	Incredible Love (2005)	Forestry EP (2007)

Professional ratings
Review scores
Source	Rating
PopMatters	7/10 stars
Collective (BBC)	4/5 stars
Drowned in Sound	7/10 stars
Mojo	4/5 stars
London Evening Standard	4/5 stars

Incredible Love is Chris Brokaw's third solo album, the follow-up to 2003's Wandering As Water.

== Background ==
Released on October 25, 2005, Incredible Love was recorded in 2004 between the months of March and September. Whilst the album itself was recorded and mixed by Paul Q. Kolderie at Camp Street, Cambridge, MA, in between August and September 2004, the basic tracks on "Blues for the Moon", "Move", and "My Idea" were recorded by Andy Hong at Kimchee, in Cambridge, MA, in March 2004. The album was mastered by Alan Douches at West West Side.

All songs were written by Chris Brokaw, with the exception of "My Idea" and "I Remember". "My Idea" was co-written by Brokaw and Tom Morgan and was originally covered by Evan Dando in his 2003 solo album Baby I'm Bored. "I Remember" was co-written by Alan Vega and Martin Rev of Suicide and was originally released as the B-side to their "Cheree" single.

Performing with Brokaw in the studio were Jeff Goddard from Karate and Kevin Coultas from Rodan, with both of whom Brokaw had worked in 1996 during the recording of Come's third album, Near-Life Experience, as well as Noah Chasin from Harm Farm, Matt Kadane from Bedhead and The New Year, and David Michael Curry and Jonah Sacks, both from Empty House Cooperative.

== Track listing ==
All songs composed by Chris Brokaw, unless otherwise noted.

No.	Title	Writer(s)	Length
1.	"Blues for the Moon"		2:05
2.	"Move"		3:02
3.	"The Information Age"		3:11
4.	"I Remember"	Alan Vega and Martin Rev	3:09
5.	"X's for Eyes"		4:29
6.	"Whose Blood"		3:58
7.	"On a Great Lake"		1:12
8.	"Cranberries"		3:25
9.	"Gringa"		4:20
10.	"100 Faces"		3:59
11.	"My Idea"	Chris Brokaw and Tom Morgan	2:40

Spanish Import Bonus Track (Acuarela Discos)
No.	Title	Writer(s)	Length
12.	"Through the Roof"	Chris Brokaw	2:56

Vinyl Version Bonus Track (I And Ear Records)
No.	Title	Writer(s)	Length
12.	"Whole Wide World"	Chris Brokaw

== Personnel ==
- Chris Brokaw – Vocals, Guitars, Bass, Drums, Percussion
- Noah Chasin – Violin on "X's For Eyes"
- Kevin Coultas – Drums on "The Information Age", "Whose Blood", "Cranberries", "Gringa"
- Dave Curry – Viola on "X's For Eyes", "My Idea"
- Jeff Goddard – Bass on "The Information Age", "Whose Blood", "Cranberries", "Gringa"
- Matt Kadane – Piano on "The Information Age"
- Jonah Sacks – Cello on "X's For Eyes"

Additional personnel

- Paul Q. Kolderie – Producer, Mixing
- Andy Hong – Pre-Production
- Alan Douches – Mastering
- Chris Brokaw – Photography
- Jill Simonsen – Layout
- Elisha Wiesner – Additional Producer

== Critical reception ==
Time Out New York stated that "Brokaw's arresting new album, Incredible Love, is the work of an assured veteran, rewarding down to the last detail." Jill LaBrack, writing for PopMatters, begins her review of the album by stating that "[t]here are some (me) who believe that every rock record would be better if only Chris Brokaw would play guitar on it", finally concluding that Incredible Love proves that "Chris Brokaw may be known as the guitar guy in some great bands, but now he should be heralded for what he has accomplished primarily by himself."

David Sheppard, writing for BBC's Collective, noted that "Incredible Love finally unveils [Chris Brokaw's] sandpapery voice, marrying it convincingly with the crisp combo arrangements", adding that Brokaw handles vocals "with the swagger of a veteran frontman." Mike Diver, reviewing the album for Drowned in Sound, proclaimed that "[r]epeated listens suck you in with ease, making Incredible Love an unexpected early highlight of 2006's singer-songwriter releases." Mojo magazine's four star review declared that "stark, against-the-odds beauty is Incredible Love's USP." Mike Wolf, the music editor of Time Out New York, named Incredible Love the best album of 2005: "A talent that first appeared on the radar 15 years ago, this singer-songwriter and guitarist delivers his masterwork."
