= Matt and Bubba Kadane =

American musical duo

Matt & Bubba Kadane
- Origin: Wichita Falls, Texas
- Genres: Indie rock, rock and roll, slowcore
- Years active: 1980s–present
- Labels: Trance Syndicate, Touch and Go Records, Plexifilm
- Website: BubbaKadane.com

Matt and Bubba Kadane is an American musical duo that consists of two brothers, Matt Kadane and Bubba Kadane. They have founded three indie rock bands, serving as producers, songwriters, vocalists, and guitarists in all of them. The first, Bedhead, released three well-received studio LPs before it was disbanded. The brothers reformed as The New Year in 2001, and in 2012 they formed the group Overseas with David Bazan and Will Johnson.

== Discography ==
=== Bedhead ===
Albums

- 1994: WhatFunLifeWas (Trance Syndicate)
- 1996: Beheaded (Trance Syndicate)
- 1998: Transaction de Novo (Trance Syndicate)

Singles and EPs

- 1992: Bedside Table/Living Well (Direct Hit Records)
- 1993: The Rest of the Day/I'm Not Here (Direct Hit Records)
- 1994: 4-songCDEP19:10 (Trance Syndicate)
- 1996: The Dark Ages EP (Trance Syndicate)
- 1998: Lepidoptera/Leper (Trance Syndicate)
- 2000: Macha Loved Bedhead (Jetset Records)
- 2024: Atmosphere/Disorder (split 7" of Joy Division covers with Codeine) (Numero Group)
- 2026: Macha Loved Bedhead (12" vinyl reissue) (Numero Group)

Compilations/Live albums

- 2014: 1992–1998 Box Set (Numero Group)
- 2015: Live 1998 live album (Numero Group)

=== The New Year ===
- 2001: Newness Ends (Touch & Go)
- 2004: The End Is Near (Touch & Go)
- 2008: The New Year (Touch & Go)
- 2017: Snow (Undertow Music Collective)

=== Overseas ===
- 2013: Overseas

=== Soundtracks ===
- 2004: Music from the Film Hell House (Plexifilm)
- 2026: The Ghosts of Hell House (self-released)

=== Performance/production credits ===
Performance and production credits for Matt and Bubba Kadane
| Yr | Release title | Artist(s) | Label | Matt | Bubba | Role |
|---|---|---|---|---|---|---|
| 2001 | S/T | Chris Brokaw, Viva Las Vegas | Acuarela Discos | Yes | No | Performance |
| 2002 | Consonant | Consonant | Fenway Recordings | Yes | No | Performance |
| 2002 | Italian Platinum | Silkworm | Touch and Go | Yes | No | Keyboards |
| 2003 | Love & Affliction | Consonant | Fenway Recordings | Yes | No | Performance |
| 2003 | "It Looks Like You" (UK #75) | Evan Dando | Bar/None Records | Yes | No | Performance |
| 2004 | It'll Be Cool | Silkworm | Touch and Go | Yes | No | Keyboards |
| 2005 | Incredible Love | Chris Brokaw | 12XU | Yes | No | Performance |
| 2006 | Music from The O. C. Mix 6 (track "The End's Not Near") | Various (Band of Horses) | Warner Bros. Records | Yes | Yes | Writers |
| 2006 | Chokes | Silkworm | Comedy Minus One | Yes | No | Performance |
| 2006 | An Idiot Not To Appreciate Your Time (track "Clean'd Me Out”) | Various | Genuflecting | Yes | Yes | Performance |
| 2007 | 2-song 7-inch | Tre Orsi | Works Progress | No | Yes | Producer |
| 2008 | Takes (track "Bedside Table") | Adem | Domino Recording Company | Yes | Yes | Writers |
| 2010 | Devices and Emblems | Tre Orsi | Comedy Minus One | No | Yes | Producer |
| 2010 | Casual Victim Pile (track "The Engineer") | Various | Matador Records | No | Yes | Producer |
