= 1992–1998 =

Compilation album by Bedhead
- Released: November 11, 2014
- Recorded: 1992–1997
- Genres: Indie rock, slowcore
- Length: 3:12:27
- Label: The Numero Group (NUM1242)
- Producer: Bedhead

Bedhead chronology
Transaction de Novo (1998)	1992–1998 (2014)	Live 1998 (2015)

Professional ratings
Aggregate scores
Source	Rating
Metacritic	87/100
Review scores
Source	Rating
AllMusic	4.5/5 stars
The Austin Chronicle	3/5 stars
Blurt	4/5 stars
Exclaim!	9/10 stars
The Line of Best Fit	9.5/10
Pitchfork	8.5/10
Record Collector	5/5 stars
Under the Radar	8/10

1992–1998 (also known as Bedhead: 1992–1998) is a compilation boxed set by the American band Bedhead containing all three of their studio albums as well as early singles and extended plays. It was released on November 11, 2014, by the Numero Group. The boxset was released on compact disc and vinyl formats, with the LP edition being limited to 2,000 copies. Along with the release of this boxset, all three Bedhead albums were also released separately on LP formats; however, this set's fourth disc, Singles/EPs/B-Sides, is exclusive to this release only.

== Background ==
Matt and Bubba Kadane had been performing music together since they were children and they formed Bedhead in Austin, Texas, with the drummer Trini Martinez, the guitarist Tench Coxe and the bass guitarist Kris Wheat in 1991. The group released its first two 7-inch singles through Direct Hit Records in 1992 and 1993 before being signed by the local Austin record label Trance Syndicate in 1993. The group released three albums with the label: WhatFunLifeWas (1994), Beheaded (1996) and Transaction de Novo (1998), as well as the extended plays 4-songEP19:10 (1994) and The Dark Ages (1995). Bedhead's music received praise from critics for its style and sound. The band broke up in 1998, shortly after the release of Transaction de Novo.

== Reception ==
On its release, 1992–1998 gained much praise from critics. Pitchfork writer Mark Richardson rewarded the boxset an 8.5 out of a possible 10, as well as giving it "Best New Reissue" status. Fred Thomas of AllMusic rated the set 4.5 out of 5, stating that it "[demands] commitment and close inspection to even begin to crack the veneer of these songs to see the devastating beauty within".

== Track list ==
All tracks are written by Matt and Bubba Kadane, except where noted.

Disc one: WhatFunLifeWas
No.	Title	Length
1.	"Liferaft"	4:40
2.	"Haywire"	4:12
3.	"Bedside Table"	4:44
4.	"The Unpredictable Landlord"	4:19
5.	"Crushing"	3:51
6.	"Unfinished"	4:33
7.	"Powder"	7:03
8.	"Foaming Love"	4:14
9.	"To The Ground"	2:58
10.	"Living Well"	4:24
11.	"Wind Down"	3:32

Disc two: Beheaded
No.	Title	Length
1.	"Beheaded"	4:44
2.	"The Rest of the Day"	6:19
3.	"Left Behind"	3:47
4.	"What's Missing"	3:49
5.	"Smoke"	2:44
6.	"Burned Out"	3:57
7.	"Roman Candle"	4:29
8.	"Withdraw"	4:22
9.	"Felo de se"	3:09
10.	"Lares and Penates"	3:52
11.	"Losing Memories"	2:57

Disc three: Transaction de Novo
No.	Title	Length
1.	"Exhume"	4:16
2.	"More Than Ever"	4:17
3.	"Parade"	4:48
4.	"Half-thought"	3:32
5.	"Extramundane"	3:03
6.	"Forgetting"	3:40
7.	"Lepidoptera"	3:03
8.	"Psychosomatica"	3:15
9.	"The Present"	7:07

Disc four: Singles/EPs/B-Sides
No.	Title	Taken from	Length
1.	"Bedside Table" (7" version)	Bedside Table 7"	4:36
2.	"Living Well" (7" version)	Bedside Table 7"	3:54
3.	"The Rest of the Day" (7" version)	The Rest of the Day 7"	5:13
4.	"I'm Not Here"	The Rest of the Day 7"	2:51
5.	"Heiszahobit"	4-songEP19:10	4:16
6.	"Dead Language"	4-songEP19:10	5:25
7.	"What I'm Here For"	4-songEP19:10	4:31
8.	"Disorder" (Joy Division)	4-songEP19:10	4:55
9.	"The Dark Ages"	The Dark Ages	5:26
10.	"Inhume"	The Dark Ages	6:05
11.	"Any Life"	The Dark Ages	3:20
12.	"Intents and Purposes"	Previously Unreleased	3:34
13.	"Golden Brown" (The Stranglers)	Previously Unreleased	3:27
14.	"Leper"	Lepidoptera 10"	5:14

== Personnel ==
Bedhead

- Matt Kadane - guitar, vocals
- Bubba Kadane - guitar, vocals
- Tench Coxe - guitar
- Kris Wheat - bass guitar
- Trini Martinez - drums

Production

- Paul Quigg - recording, mixing (WhatFunLifeWas)
- Adam Wiltzie - recording, mixing (Beheaded)
- Steve Albini - recording (Transaction de Novo)
- Mark Elliott - recording (Singles/EPs/B-Sides)
- Bedhead - recording, production, mixing
- Matthew Barnhart - mastering

Artwork and design

- Matt Gallaway - liner notes
- Henry Owings - art direction
- Frank Goodenough - design, graphic assistance
- Violet Hopkins - photography
- John Maxwell - photography
- Josh Robertson - photography
- Michelle Coral - photography
- Nick Ruth - photography
- Patty Rooney - photography
