= The New Year (band) =

American indie rock band

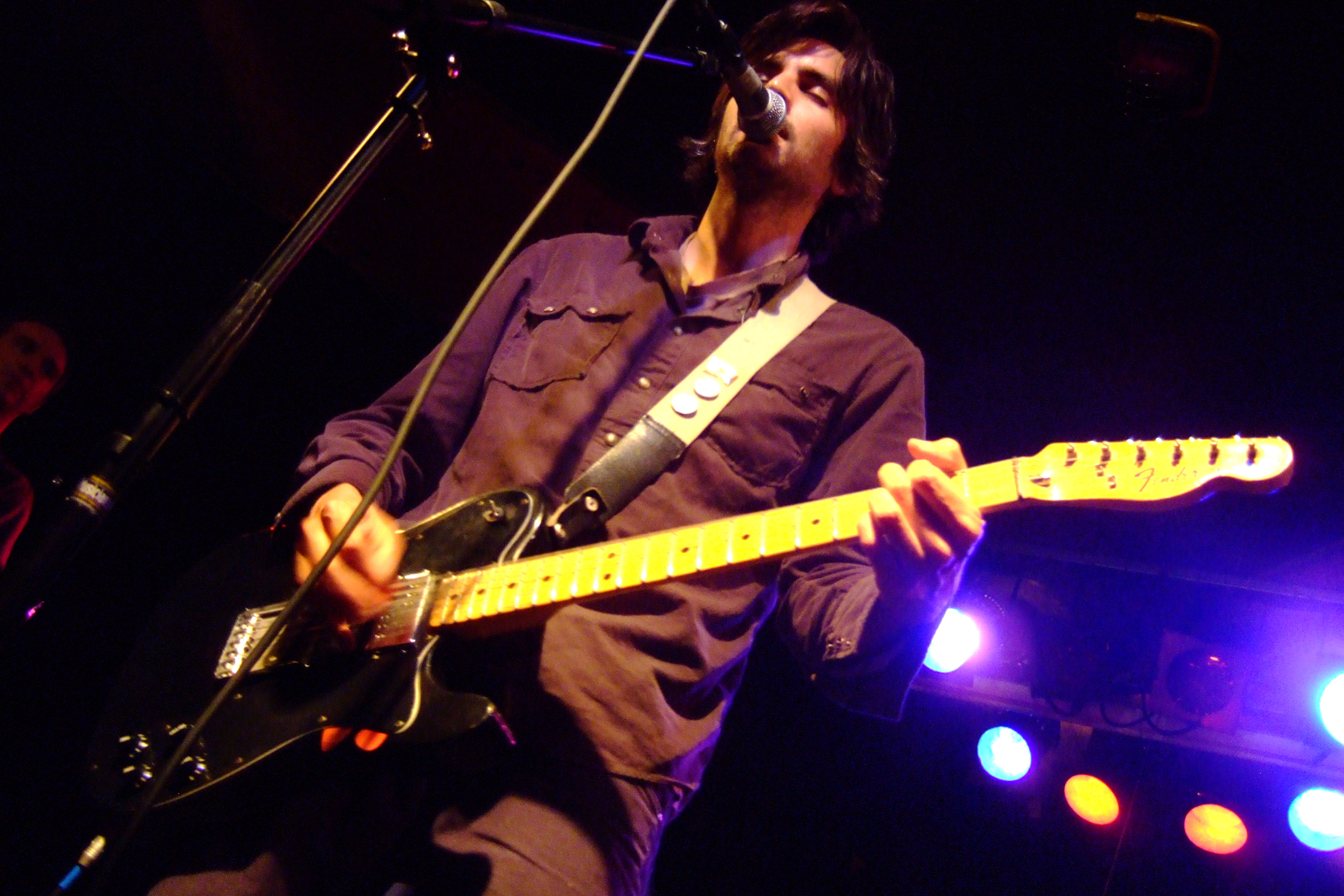
- Matt Kadane of the New Year in 2007, one of two vocalists in the six-member band

Background information
- Origin: United States
- Genres: Indie rock; slowcore; post-rock
- Years active: 1999–present
- Labels: Undertow; Touch and Go
- Spinoffs: Overseas
- Spinoff of: Bedhead
- Members: Matt Kadane; Bubba Kadane; Mike Donofrio; Chris Brokaw
- Past members: Peter Schmidt; Josh McKay
- Website: www.thenewyear.net

The New Year is an American indie rock band that formed in 1999. The band was started by former Bedhead members Matt and Bubba Kadane. They released their first album in 2001, Newness Ends, which like their following albums was recorded with Steve Albini. The End Is Near (2004) and The New Year (2008) followed, with both being received positively by music critics at Pitchfork and AllMusic. In February 2017, the band announced their first album in nine years, Snow, which was released on April 28, 2017.

== History ==
=== Background ===
The band was formed in 1999, a year after the demise of the band Bedhead by former Bedhead members Matt and Bubba Kadane. The New Year was originally intended to be a two-person project made up of only the Kadane brothers. Four musicians, all longtime friends of the Kadanes, were slowly recruited for live performances and the lineup solidified.

Like Bedhead in its later years, The New Year started with no real base of operations. Early on Matt and Bubba Kadane were located respectively in Boston and Dallas. The band soon added bassist Mike Donofrio (of the band Saturnine, located in New York City), drummer Chris Brokaw (in Boston, formerly of the bands Codeine and Come), and guitarist Peter Schmidt (located in Dallas, formerly of the bands Three on a Hill, Funland, Legendary Crystal Chandelier, and part-time member of Bedhead).

=== Recording and touring ===
Newness Ends (2001)

In 2000, The New Year recorded their first album, Newness Ends, in Chicago, with Steve Albini. Albini had previously recorded the final Bedhead album Transaction De Novo. Newness Ends was released in February 2001 on Touch & Go Records. Because the lineup wasn't complete at the time of its recording, not everyone credited on the album (namely Schmidt) actually played on it. The album garnered critical praise and comparison to the Kadanes' previous work. The Kadanes said in interviews at the time that they felt the only real difference between Bedhead and The New Year was the name, and that if Bedhead had not disbanded that their next album would have sounded very similar to Newness Ends.

For a time in 2003 their friend Josh McKay (of the Athens, Georgia band Macha) joined on keyboards, guitar, and random percussion. the members separated again with most working on other projects. The Kadanes recorded a score for the documentary film Hell House, the soundtrack of which wasn't released until 2004, though the film first appeared in 2001. Brokaw released solo recordings, played on recordings by Evan Dando and Consonant and collaborated on a project with playwright Rinde Eckert. Peter Schmidt played with the Legendary Crystal Chandelier, whose second and final album, Beyond Indifference, was released at about the same time as Newness Ends.

The End Is Near (2004)

In 2003 the members regrouped as The New Year to record the material that would become their album The End Is Near. The album, released by Touch & Go Records in May 2004, was again recorded by Steve Albini. Positively received in publications such as the Dusted Magazine, the band filmed a music video (a first for the Kadanes) for the song "Disease" to accompany the album. The album yielded the band's most popular single, "The End's Not Near," which quickly garnered over two hundred thousand views on YouTube.

The New Year (2008)

A third album by The New Year, The New Year, was released on September 9, 2008. The material is described by Touch and Go Records in a press release stating, "Lyrically, these ten songs address the interlocked themes of lost time, frustrated desire, and the need for others." Like with their other albums, the songs have three guitars. The New Year, however, was new in that almost half the songs are built around the piano.

The album was well-received, earning 4.5/5 stars from Allmusic and 7.5 from Pitchfork. A generally positive review by Pitchfork praised the album's more cheerful melodies and hopeful lyrics, while noting the melancholy sound of the band's previous releases was intact on many of the songs.

Will Johnson from the band Centro-matic accompanied the band on the US leg of its autumn 2008 tour.

Overseas and Snow (2017)

In June 2012 drummer Chris Brokaw posted on his website that "The New Year has begun work on a new LP in Chicago, again with Mr. Steve Albini at the controls."

In early 2012 Bubba and Matt Kadane formed Overseas with David Bazan of Pedro The Lion and Will Johnson of Centro-matic. Their debut album was officially announced on April 4, 2013 and was released on June 11, 2013.

The New Year announced in early 2017 that their fourth album, titled Snow, would be released through the Undertow Music Collective. Snow is the first album by the group to not be issued through Touch and Go Records, and the first album by them since their 9-year absence. Four videos were released for the songs "Myths," "Snow," "The Last Fall," and "The Beast."

== Members ==
Current

- Matt Kadane - vocals, guitar
- Bubba Kadane - vocals, guitar
- Mike Donofrio - bass
- Chris Brokaw - drums

Rotating/past

- Peter Schmidt - guitar
- Josh McKay - keyboards, guitar, percussion

== Discography ==
=== Studio albums ===
List of studio and live albums by The New Year
Year	Album title	Release details
2001	Newness Ends	Released: Feb 20, 2001; Label: Touch & Go Records; Format: LP, CD, digital
2004	The End Is Near	Released: May 18, 2004; Label: Touch & Go; Format: LP, CD, digital
2008	The New Year	Released: Sept 9, 2008; Label: Touch & Go; Format: LP, CD, digital
2017	Snow	Released: Apr 28, 2017; Label: Undertow Music; Format: LP, CD, digital

=== Singles ===
Incomplete list of songs by
Year	Title	Album	Notes
2003	"Sinking Ship" (demo version)	Single only	Esopus Magazine
2004	"The End's Not Near"	The End Is Near	

=== Covers ===
The New Year songs have been covered by the following artists:

- 2006: "The End's Not Near" covered by Band of Horses (Warner Bros. Records)

== See also ==
- Bedhead
- Overseas
