= Tamotait =

Studio album by Tamikrest
- Released: 27 March 2020
- Length: 41:24
- Label: Glitterbeat

Tamikrest chronology
Kidal (2017)	Tamotait (2020)

Professional ratings
Aggregate scores
Source	Rating
Metacritic	79/100
Review scores
Source	Rating
PopMatters	8/10

Tamotait is the fifth studio album by Malian group Tamikrest. It was released on March 27, 2020, under Glitterbeat.

The first single from the album, "Awnafin" was released on 10 February 2020. The Moroccan singer Hindi Zahra provided guest vocals on the track "Timtarin". The musicians who recorded on the album are : Ousmane Ag Mossa, Aghaly Ag Mohamedine, Cheick Ag Tiglia, Paul Salvagnac and Nicolas Grupp.

== Critical reception ==
Tamotait was met with generally favorable reviews from critics. At Metacritic, which assigns a weighted average rating out of 100 to reviews from mainstream publications, this release received an average score of 79, based on 6 reviews.

== Track listing ==
Tamotait track listing
No.	Title	Length
1.	"Awnafin"	4:08
2.	"Azawad"	4:01
3.	"Amzagh"	4:18
4.	"Amidinin Tad Adouniya"	3:54
5.	"As Sastnan Hidjan"	5:16
6.	"Timtarin"	5:50
7.	"Tihoussay"	5:02
8.	"Anha Achal Wad Namda"	3:37
9.	"Tabsit"	5:18
