= Beheaded (disambiguation) =

Beheaded may refer to:

- The intentional separation of the head from the body as a form of decapitation
- Beheading of John the Baptist, a holy day observed by various Christian churches which follow liturgical traditions

== Music ==
=== Artists ===
- Beheaded (band), a death metal band from Malta

=== Albums ===
- Beheaded (album), a 1996 album by Bedhead

=== Songs ===
- "Beheaded", by The Offspring from The Offspring (album)
