= Newness Ends =

Studio album by the New Year
- Released: February 20, 2001
- Recorded: July 12–16, 2000
- Studio: Electrical Audio (Chicago, Illinois)
- Genre: Indie rock, slowcore
- Length: 32:41
- Label: Touch and Go
- Producer: Matt and Bubba Kadane

The New Year chronology
Newness Ends (2001)	The End Is Near (2004)

Professional ratings
Review scores
Source	Rating
AllMusic	4/5 stars
The Austin Chronicle	4/5 stars
The A.V. Club	favorable
Exclaim!	favorable
Pitchfork	7.9/10

Newness Ends is the debut album by the New Year, released on February 20, 2001, through Touch and Go Records. The New Year is led by former Bedhead co-founders Matt and Bubba Kadane. The album received very positive reviews and has been compared to their work in Bedhead.

== Track listing ==
All music is composed by Matt and Bubba Kadane.

No.	Title	Length
1.	"Half a Day"	3:56
2.	"Reconstruction"	3:21
3.	"Gasoline"	3:34
4.	"Great Expectations"	2:40
5.	"Simple Life"	3:29
6.	"One Plus One Minus One Equals One"	4:23
7.	"Alter Ego"	2:44
8.	"The Block That Doesn't Exist"	2:38
9.	"Carne Levare"	2:37
10.	"Newness Ends"	3:19

== Personnel ==
- Matt Kadane - vocals, guitar, production
- Bubba Kadane - guitar, production, vocals ("Simple Life")
- Mike Donofio - bass
- Chris Brokaw - drums
- Steve Albini - recording engineer
- John Golden - mastering
