= Red Cities (album) =

Studio album by Chris Brokaw
- Released: 2002
- Recorded: January–March 2001
- Genre: Alternative rock, Post-rock
- Label: 12xu Kimchee Records
- Producer: Peter Weiss

Chris Brokaw chronology
Red Cities (2002)	Wandering As Water (2003)

Red Cities is the 2002 debut solo album of American musician Chris Brokaw, following the demise of his earlier band Come.

== Background ==
Released in 2002 by 12xu and Kimchee Records, the album was recorded by Peter Weiss at Zippah Recording, in Brookline, MA, during January and March 2001. The idea for the album was originally conceived in 1998, the centerpiece of the entire project being "The Fields (Part II)". As Brokaw himself has stated, "[t]he record just came to [him] as a whole" before the demise of his previous band, and Brokaw "didn’t want them to become Come songs — which is what most of [his] songs would have been at the time." After producing the first demos on an 8-track cassette recorder, Brokaw decided to attempt to undertake the project on his own.

"The Look of Love" is a cover of Burt Bacharach's 1967 single.

== Track listing ==
No.	Title	Writer(s)	Length
1.	"Gauntlet"	Chris Brokaw	1:14
2.	"The Fields, Pt. II"	Chris Brokaw	10:40
3.	"Calimoxcho"	Chris Brokaw	2:31
4.	"Even as We Speak"	Chris Brokaw	1:15
5.	"The Fields"	Chris Brokaw	3:58
6.	"King Ferdinand"	Chris Brokaw	3:46
7.	"Tournament"	Chris Brokaw	3:44
8.	"Bath House"	Chris Brokaw	1:57
9.	"Topsfield State Fair"	Chris Brokaw	2:46
10.	"Wallet Corner"	Chris Brokaw	0:50
11.	"Dresden Promenade"	Chris Brokaw	5:27
12.	"The Look of Love"	Burt Bacharach/Hal David	3:39
13.	"Shadows"	Chris Brokaw/Dr. John/Jerome Doc Pomus	2:40
14.	"At the Crossroads"	Chris Brokaw/Doug Sahm	0:50

== Personnel ==
- Chris Brokaw – guitars and percussion

Additional personnel

- Pete Weiss – Producer, Mixing
- Peter Linnane – Assistant Engineer
- Paul Q. Kolderie – Mixing
- David M. Curry – Pre-production
- Andy Hong – Pre-production
- Carl Plaster – Pre-production
- Jeff Lipton – Audio mastering
- Dan Zedek – Cover Design
- Maxi del Campo – Photography
- Milo Jones – Arrangements on "The Look of Love" (with Chris Brokaw)

== Critical reception ==
Professional ratings
Review scores
Source	Rating
Allmusic	4.5/5 stars
Hot Press	Positive
Exclaim!	Positive

Time Out New York referred to Red Cities as "an evocative set of instrumentals," and elsewhere, "an enthralling spread of guitar-and-percussion instrumentals that have as much emotional power as -and greater range than- any of his previous outings." Pitchfork's praiseful review of Red Cities' follow-up Wandering as Water referred to both albums as "largely vocal offering[s] creep[ing] along an unadorned path towards anachronistic purity." In his positive review of the album for Hot Press magazine, Colin Carberry stated that "some of the tracks on Red Cities are so vividly redolent of a sense of place, it could almost be the soundtrack for a series of imaginary J.G Ballard travelogues." Likewise, Roman Sokal, writing for Exclaim! magazine, asserts that "[t]here is absolutely no hint of pretension within the album, just a stepped back assault of thoughtful and clever 'soundtrack' music for your aching soul."
