= Bedhead (band) =

American indie rock band

- Origin: Dallas, Texas, United States
- Genres: Indie rock; slowcore; post-rock
- Years active: 1988–1998
- Labels: Direct Hit; Trance Syndicate; Jetset; Numero
- Spinoffs: The New Year; Overseas
- Past members: Matt Kadane; Bubba Kadane; Tench Coxe; Kris Wheat; Trini Martinez
- Website: Bedhead Official

Bedhead was an American indie rock band, active from 1988 to 1998, based in Dallas, Texas. Members consisted of Matt and Bubba Kadane (vocals and guitar), Tench Coxe (guitar), Kris Wheat (bass), and Trini Martinez (drums). The band released several EPs and three LPs on Trance Syndicate, touring intermittently. Bedhead's music was generally subdued, with three electric guitars and one electric bass guitar over sung or spoken vocals. Allmusic dubbed the group "the quintessential indie rock band," and Tiny Mix Tapes gave their final album Transaction de Novo a perfect 5/5 score.

In 1999, a year after the breakup of Bedhead, Matt and Bubba Kadane went on to form The New Year, a band with a style similar to Bedhead's.

== History ==
=== 1988-1993: Founding ===
The roots of the band trace back to brothers Matt and Bubba Kadane playing music together as children in Wichita Falls, Texas. They later began playing music together in Dallas, Texas.

The brothers founded Bedhead after their father died from a brain tumor: Matt Kadane stated that a lot of their music was rooted in "an outpouring of grief... Bubba and I didn’t talk much about [their father's death]. But we played music together".

The band formed without a name and became active in 1988. Drummer Trini Martinez was the first addition to the duo's band in 1990, followed by guitarist Tench Coxe and bassist Kris Wheat. The band named themselves Bedhead in 1992. After playing their debut show under the Bedhead name in Austin that year, they released two early singles on Dallas-based record label Direct Hit Records, one in 1992 and one in 1993.

=== 1993-1996: WhatFunLifeWas ===
In 1993, the band came to the attention of King Coffey, drummer of the Butthole Surfers and founder of Trance Syndicate Records, who signed them to Trance Syndicate shortly after hearing them.

The band began working on what would eventually become their debut album, WhatFunLifeWas, in the summer of 1993 on a budget of $3,000. They recorded about half the album before starting over and re-recording it with new techniques.

The album was later released in the summer of 1994 to positive reviews. Sputnik Music gave WhatFunLifeWas 4/5 stars, and it received 4.5/5 stars from Allmusic.

Sputnik Music stated that the album's themes touch on loss and depression, "but with a sense of the profound. WhatFunLifeWas is a modest album; slow indie rock with a hint of the epic, that draws upon its broodiness to create a serenely personal atmosphere." Allmusic noted the band's careful use of both loud and soft dynamics, stating "The various comparisons to the Velvet Underground, Joy Division, and Spacemen 3 all make a certain sense, but...Bedhead have much more of an individual sensibility...rather than simply rehashing."

=== 1996-1998: Beheaded ===
The band released two EPs before beginning recording for their second album. The first EP was a one-take recording at a small church on March 31, 1994, titled 4-songEP19:10. The group launched its first expansive tour in the middle of 1995, and released the EP The Dark Ages in February 1996.

Their second LP Beheaded was released on Trance Syndicate in June 1996. Beheaded received 4/5 stars from Allmusic, with a positive review stating, "at the heart of the band is an indie rock sound that can be traced back to the most pleasant material of the Velvet Underground. A trio of guitars lays down unexceptional, strummed accompaniments; vocalists employ a reserved sing-speak; the drummer maintains a lazy pulse. However, with Bedhead these elements are so perfectly executed that the music seems to play itself. Beheaded represents another stop on the road to slow-burning, soaring, indie rock/pop perfection."

Soon after the release of Beheaded, the band went out on another tour of the U.S. and Canada, and later in 1997 went on another that saw the attendance at their shows grow dramatically (and the band's only TV appearance on an Italian national show).

=== 1998: Transaction de Novo and break-up ===
Their last LP, Transaction de Novo, was recorded by Steve Albini at Electrical Audio and released in 1998. In a departure from their usual sound, Transaction De Novo featured more up-tempo, heavily distorted songs than its predecessors. Transaction de Novo received 4.5/5 stars from Allmusic, with a positive review stating "It's hard to imagine the group perfecting this sound much further." The album received a perfect 5/5 score from Tiny Mix Tapes.

Bedhead broke up shortly after the release of Transaction De Novo, in 1998. Kadane said that the break-up happened due to both the fact that the members lived in three different places and the Bedhead name being shared with a hair-product company from their hometown of Dallas.

After their breakup, the "Lepidoptera/Leper" 10" single was released in October 1998 on Trance Syndicate. This was followed by Macha Loved Bedhead, on April 25, 2000: a collaboration between the Kadane Brothers and Macha released on Jetset Records. After the band ended, guitarist Tench Coxe earned a PhD in Russian Literature from Columbia University. He went on to become a college professor, joining the faculty at Midwestern State University in Wichita Falls, Texas in 2014.

==== The New Year and Overseas ====
In the summer of 1999, the Kadane brothers formed The New Year and signed to Touch and Go Records. The sound of The New Year more or less picked up where Bedhead left off (a song from their debut, "Gasoline", was originally a Bedhead song). Matt Kadane also played drums in the band Consonant between 2001 and 2003 and piano, clavinet, and organ with Silkworm from 2002 to 2005. While still playing with The New Year, Bubba and Matt Kadane formed Overseas in 2012 with David Bazan of Pedro The Lion and Will Johnson of Centro-matic. Their debut and so far only album was released on June 11, 2013. The New Year have released four albums to date, the latest being Snow in 2017.

==== Sigh of Relief ====
Since 2019, Bubba Kadane has released three Bandcamp-exclusive albums of ambient and minimalist music with his solo project Sigh of Relief. Abandoning the guitar-and-song format for electroacoustic soundscapes, the albums Injection (2019), The Dark Surround (2021), and Lifespan (2023) nevertheless employ the same distinctive, inimitable style and contrasting, stereophonic instrumental textures found in Bedhead and The New Year.

==== The Destructors Club ====
In 2024, Bedhead's rhythm section, Trini Martinez and Kris Wheate, came out as part of the long-in-the-making The Destructors Club, a project that also includes Britt Robisheaux, Big Youth, Scientist and before their passing recorded collaborations with the late Lee "Scratch" Perry and the late Mark Stewart (frontman of the British post-punk band The Pop Group). Their debut, a 12" entitled The Destructors Club Meets... Scientist was released a year after Mark Stewart's death to celebrate his life and his crucial work. The band straddles the line between post-punk and unorthodox dub and has a full-length LP in the works.

== Chronology ==
Date	
1988	Band forms without a name
Jan 1992	First Bedhead show in Austin for a friend's art opening
May 1992	Release of Bedside Table/Living Well 7-inch on Direct Hit Records
Dec 1993	Release of The Rest Of The Day/I'm Not Here 7-inch on Direct Hit Records
Feb 1994	Tour of Germany (with an invitation from a German band)
Apr 4, 1994	Release of WhatFunLifeWas on Trance Syndicate Records
Summer 1994	Failed attempt to record songs later to appear on Beheaded
Oct 25, 1994	Release of 4-songCDEP19:10 on Trance Syndicate Records
June 1995	Toured the West Coast and played various shows in the rest of the country
July 1995	Recording session for The Dark Ages EP and Beheaded
Jan 1996	Tour of US deep south
Feb 20, 1996	Release of The Dark Ages 3-song EP (CD/10-inch)
June 18, 1996	Release of Beheaded 11-song LP/CD
June/July 1996	4-week US/Canada Tour
Mar/Apr 1997	3-week Eastern US tour (last week of dates cancelled due to an illness in the band)
May 2–9, 1997	Recording session for Transaction de Novo
Aug 1997	Shows in Austin and Dallas to preview the yet-to-be-released Transaction de Novo
Nov 4, 1997	Release of one-sided 12-inch vinyl version of 4-songEP19:10
Feb 10, 1998	Release of Transaction de Novo 9-song LP/CD
Mar 9-22, 1998	Western US tour
Apr 10-May 2, 1998	Eastern US tour
May 9–20, 1998	European tour
May 20, 1998	Live session with VPRO
Aug 3, 1998	Band breaks up
Oct 20, 1998	Release of "Lepidoptera"/"Leper" 10-inch
Summer 1999	Matt and Bubba Kadane form The New Year and go on to release four full-length albums as of 2017
Apr 25, 2000	release of Macha Loved Bedhead CDEP
2012	Formation of Overseas, who released their debut (and only album) in 2013
Nov 11, 2014	release of BEDHEAD 1992-1998 box set
Apr 18, 2015	release of Live In Chicago LP/CD
Feb 16, 2024	release of "Atmosphere/Disorder" (split 7" of Joy Division covers with Codeine)

== Musical style and influences ==
Bedhead's music was generally subdued, with a polyphonic sound based on the interlocking of single-line melodies played by three electric guitars and one electric bass guitar (often played with a capo), nearly always using clean (undistorted) tones, prompting comparisons to the Velvet Underground. According to Matt Kadane, one major influence on their minimalist approach was the later work of Talk Talk, especially their album Spirit of Eden.

According to Allmusic, "What distinguished [Bedhead] was the way it combined [indie rock]'s modest ambitions with careful song construction and rock & roll's sense of grand dynamic excitement. This was the quintessential indie rock band because it delivered some of the best the genre is capable of: workaday vocals that actually work, gorgeous melodies (though uncommercial, this music doesn't have to be indigestible), and dynamics that could crush the listener."

The group's vocals were often delivered in such a low-key manner that they could be difficult to decipher. This unusual sound was dubbed by some critics as "slowcore", referring to the slow tempos of many of the band's songs, though the band's members objected to the labeling in interviews. In reality, many of the group's songs only begin slowly before building in speed, intensity, and volume. Bedhead also experimented with time signatures less commonly used in rock music, by playing some songs in 7/8 or 5/4 meter.

== Members ==
- Matt Kadane – guitar, vocals
- Bubba Kadane – guitar, vocals
- Tench Coxe – guitar
- Kris Wheat – bass guitar
- Trini Martinez – drums

== Discography ==
=== Studio albums ===
Year	Album title	Release details
1994	WhatFunLifeWas	Released: April 4, 1994; Label: Trance Syndicate; Format: LP, CD, CS, DL
1996	Beheaded	Released: June 18, 1996; Label: Trance Syndicate; Format: LP, CD, DL
1998	Transaction de Novo	Released: Feb 10, 1998; Label: Trance Syndicate; Format: LP, CD, DL

=== Singles ===
Year	Title	Format and notes	Label + release date
1992	"Bedside Table/Living Well"	7", 1000 copies	Direct Hit Records, May 1992
1993	"The Rest of the Day/I'm Not Here"	7", 33 ⅓ RPM, 2000 copies	Direct Hit Records, Dec 1993
1998	"Lepidoptera/Leper"	10"	Trance Syndicate, Oct 20, 1998
2024	"Atmosphere/Disorder"	split 7" of Joy Division covers with Codeine	Numero Group, Feb 16, 2024

=== EPs ===
Year	Album title	Release details
1994	4-songEP19:10	Released: October 25, 1994; Label: Trance Syndicate; Format: CD, CS, one-sided 12" 33 ⅓ RPM (12": Nov 4, 1997)
1996	The Dark Ages	Released: Feb 20, 1996; Label: Trance Syndicate; Format: 10", CD
2000	Macha Loved Bedhead (with Macha)	Released: April 25, 2000; Label: Jetset Records; Format: CD

=== Compilations ===
- 2014: 1992–1998 (5 LP/4 CD/DL box set) (Numero Group, Nov 11, 2014)

=== Live albums ===
- 2015: Live 1998 (Record Store Day LP edition titled Live In Chicago) (Numero Group, LP: Apr 18, 2015; CD & DL: Apr 28, 2015)

=== Unreleased ===
- 1995: Untitled Collection of Jazz Standards (Leaning House)

=== Covers of Bedhead songs by others ===
Year	Song	Covering artist(s)	Notes
2008	"Bedside Table"	Adem Ilhan	Domino Records
2013	"Living Well"	New Fumes	n/a

== See also ==
- The New Year
- Overseas
