= The Angel's Message to Me =

Studio album by Chris Brokaw and Geoff Farina
- Released: 18 March 2010 (UK); 6 May 2010 (US)
- Recorded: 2009
- Genre: Ragtime, folk, blues
- Length: 39:57
- Label: Capitan, Damnably, Jellyfant
- Producer: Mark C., Geoff Farina

Chris Brokaw and Geoff Farina chronology
The Angel's Message to Me (2010)	The Boarder's Door (2010)

Professional ratings
Review scores
Source	Rating
The Sunday Times	3/5 stars
PopMatters	7/10 stars

The Angel's Message to Me is the first studio album collaboration by Chris Brokaw and Geoff Farina as a duo. It was released on Damnably in the UK on March 18, 2010, and on Capitan Records in the US on May 6, 2010. The album is a collection of covers of pre-WWII North American blues, folk and ragtime classics by the likes of Reverend Gary Davis, Blind Blake, the Kentucky Ramblers, and Leroy Carr.

The album was recorded by Live Skull guitarist Mark C at Deep Sea studio in New York City, and Geoff Farina at Hev-E-Kreem, Somerville, MA, and was subsequently mastered at Peerless Mastering.

== Track listing ==
No.	Title	Writer(s)	Length
1.	"The Angel's Message to Me"	Reverend Gary Davis	3:05
2.	"Ginseng Blues"	Kentucky Ramblers	3:38
3.	"Guitar Chimes"	Blind Arthur Blake	2:43
4.	"In the Evening"	Leroy Carr	4:09
5.	"Make Me a Pallet on Your Floor"	Traditional	3:15
6.	"Oh Death"	Traditional	4:20
7.	"Sitting on Top of the World"	Lonnie Chatmon / Walter Vinson	2:45
8.	"St. James Infirmary Blues"	Irving Mills	3:28
9.	"Stagger Lee"	Traditional	2.57
10.	"Poor Wayfaring Stranger"	Traditional	3.51
11.	"That'll Never Happen No More"	Blind Arthur Blake	2.57
12.	"Trouble in Mind"	Richard M. Jones	2.50
