= Gambler's Ecstasy =

Studio album by Chris Brokaw
- Released: October 2, 2012
- Recorded: 2008–2012
- Genres: Alternative rock, post-rock
- Length: 37:39
- Labels: 12XU; Damnably
- Producer: Chris Brokaw

Chris Brokaw chronology
| Stories EP (2012) | Gambler's Ecstasy (2012) | Tidal Mud (2012) |

Professional ratings
Review scores
| Source | Rating |
|---|---|
| Blurt | Positive |
| Mojo | 4/5 stars |

Gambler's Ecstasy is American musician Chris Brokaw's sixth solo studio album.

== Background ==
The recording of Gambler's Ecstasy took place between 2008 and 2012 in a number of different studios: Soma in Chicago, IL; The Echo Lab in Denton, TX; and Soundhouse and The Track Shack both in Seattle, WA. The album was recorded by Matthew Barnhart, Matthew Brown, and Tim Iseler, and mixed by Matthew Barnhart and Chris Brokaw. CD and LP versions were released by Damnably and 12XU, respectively, on October 2, 2012.

All its songs are Brokaw's compositions, with the exception of "Crooked" which was written and originally performed by Cincinnati indie rock band Wussy. "Criminals" was partly inspired by the homonymous novel by Margot Livesey and originally appeared, along with "Into the Woods", in Geoff Farina and Brokaw's second collaborative album, The Boarder's Door. "The Appetites" was partly inspired by Brokaw's late friend Caroline Knapp's Appetites: Why Women Want, published posthumously in 2003, which described Knapp's experience with anorexia and women's struggles with addiction. "Richard and Vanessa in the Box" was originally commissioned by Nicole Peisl for the Daghdha dance company. "Exemptive", the instrumental opening track on Brokaw's previous album, Canaris, appears in electric form with vocals under the title "Exemption" on Gambler's Ecstasy.

Guest musicians include David Michael Curry from Empty House Cooperative, Howard Draper from Shearwater, and John Herndon and Douglas McCombs both from Tortoise.

The cover artwork is a photograph of composer and visual artist Paul Rucker's piece Convenient Truth, part of the artist's multimedia project Four Scores which had previously featured on the cover of Grantmakers in the Arts' periodical publication GIA Reader, Vol. 23, No. 1 (Winter 2012).

== Track listing ==
All songs written by Brokaw, unless otherwise noted.

| No. | Title | Writer(s) | Length |
|---|---|---|---|
| 1. | "Criminals" | | 3:15 |
| 2. | "Crooked" | Wussy | 2:34 |
| 3. | "Danny Borracho" | | 1:50 |
| 4. | "Into the Woods" | | 2:47 |
| 5. | "The Appetites" | | 9:19 |
| 6. | "Exemption" | | 3:40 |
| 7. | "California" | | 4:32 |
| 8. | "How to Listen" | | 3:53 |
| 9. | "Anacordia" | | 2:38 |
| 10. | "Richard and Vanessa in the Box" | | 3:11 |
| Total length: | | | 37:39 |

== Personnel ==
- Chris Brokaw – guitars, bass, vocals

Additional musicians

- David Michael Curry – viola on Crooked
- Howard Draper – organ on The Appetites
- John Herndon – drums on The Appetites and Exemption
- Douglas McCombs – bass guitar on The Appetites and Exemption

Additional personnel

- Paul Rucker – Front cover
- John Engle – Cover photo

== Critical reception ==
In her review of the album for Blurt, Jennifer Kelly stated that "Gambler's Ecstasy takes some risks, pursuing diverse styles and eccentric paths to tunefulness, but it mostly comes up sevens." Mojo's review stated that Brokaw's album "asserts his mastery of mood-shift", concluding that "Brokaw's weathered voice and reverberant playing make another rewarding set."

Online music publication The Line of Best Fit gave the album a rating of 8.5/10, declaring that, "[w]hether best described as having a restless muse or an open mind, there’s no denying Brokaw is a phenomenal musician." Likewise, giving the album a rating of 8/10, The 405 affirmed that "at its best, Gambler's Ecstasy can be described is a heartfelt album that is practically oozing emotion and personality." Writing for Penny Black Music, Andrew Carver ends his review of the album as follows: "Never a very high profile performer, even at Come’s height, Brokaw's Gambler’s Ecstasy shows why it would be a terrible shame to let one of America’s finest musicians fall from the radar."
