= The Boarder's Door =

Studio album by Chris Brokaw and Geoff Farina
- Released: 2010
- Recorded: June–August 2010
- Genre: Ragtime, folk, blues
- Length: 38:21
- Label: Damnably
- Producer: Chris Brokaw, Geoff Farina

Chris Brokaw and Geoff Farina chronology
The Angel's Message to Me (2010)	The Boarder's Door (2010)

Professional ratings
Review scores
Source	Rating
The Quietus	Positive
God Is in the TV	4/5 stars
The Line of Best Fit	Positive

The Boarder's Door is the second studio album collaboration by Chris Brokaw and Geoff Farina as a duo.

== Background ==
The album was released on Damnably in late 2010. Like The Angel's Message to Me, the album includes several covers; yet, unlike its predecessor, The Boarder's Door predominantly consists of original songs by Brokaw and Farina. The songs were recorded by Brokaw and Farina between the months of June and August 2010 in Berlin, Chicago, Faenza, Vasto, and Vienna, and was subsequently mastered by Matthew Barnhart at The Echo Lab, Denton, Texas.

Released as a limited edition album for sale during the duo's 2011 European Tour, The Boarder's Door features eleven demos: four original compositions by Farina and a cover, recorded by him in Chicago; three original compositions by Brokaw and a cover, recorded by him in hotel rooms in Berlin, Faenza, and Vienna. "Little Maggie" and "Try Me One More Time", two further covers, were recorded on a veranda in Vasto, Italy. Brokaw would go on to re-record "Criminals" and "Into the Woods" for his 2012 solo LP Gambler's Ecstasy, whilst Farina would rework "Prelapsarian", "Hammer and Spade", and "The Dove and the Lamb", for inclusion in his 2012 album The Wishes of the Dead.

== Track listing ==
No.	Title	Writer(s)	Length
1.	"Little Maggie"	The Stanley Brothers	3:25
2.	"Try Me One More Time"	Traditional	2:43
3.	"Hammer and Spade"	Geoff Farina	2:41
4.	"Take Me Back to Baltimore"	Elizabeth Cotten	1:27
5.	"Criminals"	Chris Brokaw	3:28
6.	"Into the Woods"	Chris Brokaw	2:49
7.	"Prelapsarian"	Geoff Farina	3:29
8.	"You Ain't on Your Way to Hell"	Geoff Farina	3:46
9.	"They're Hanging Me Tonight"	Marty Robbins	3.38
10.	"The Dove and the Lamb"	Geoff Farina	3.17
11.	"Faenza"	Chris Brokaw	7.38

== Personnel ==
- Chris Brokaw – guitar, vocals
- Geoff Farina – guitar, vocals

Additional personnel

- Jens Janson at Array – cover design
- Chris Brokaw – photography
- Matthew Barnhart – mastering

== Critical reception ==
Noel Gardner, in his positive review of the album for The Quietus, stated that '[i]n the best way possible, all the songs here kind of feel like standards', whilst Owain Paciuszko, writing for God Is in the TV Zine, referred to the album as a 'snapshot of two incredibly talented musicians perfectly at ease with themselves and playing beautiful, exciting and enriching music,' granting it four stars out of five.

Matthew Horton's review of the album for The Line of Best Fit asserted that 'Brokaw and Farina are guitar virtuosos without being overly showy – there's nothing else here but their playing and their exchange of voices, and one never overpowers the other, the guitar as eloquent as the vocal'; Similarly, Delusions of Adequacy's review of The Boarder's Door asserted that '[w]hether together, apart or just in the same vague vicinity, it's clear that Chris Brokaw and Geoff Farina's talented tributaries have entwined here masterfully once more, for a collection that comforts as much as it challenges.'
