= Stories (EP) =

EP by Chris Brokaw
- Released: 7 December 2011
- Recorded: January 2011
- Genre: Alternative rock, post-rock
- Length: 15:35 vinyl version 31:02 CD version
- Label: Limited Appeal Records
- Producer: Tim Shea

Chris Brokaw chronology
The Night She Slept With a Bear (2012)	Stories (2011)	Gambler's Ecstasy (2012)

Stories is Chris Brokaw's third solo EP.

== Background ==
Released in December 2011 by Limited Appeal Records, Stories was recorded and mixed by Tim Shea in January 2011 in Boston, MA. Dean Styers was in charge of photography and provided the album's cover art. The original pressing was a small, numbered edition of 117 copies, and contained merely three tracks, the vinyl for which was cut by Bob Weston at CMS. The EP was re-released in a CD version which included three further tracks, all instrumental versions of the songs contained in the vinyl pressing.

The vinyl release of the EP is single-sided, the B-side containing stencilled artwork by Dean Styers, who has in the past provided artwork for The Jesus Lizard, Aerosmith, and others.

== Critical reception ==
The Phoenix described Stories as "a gorgeous new EP of arid, sprawling, electric guitar-based rock."

== Track listing ==
All songs written and performed by Chris Brokaw.

No.	Title	Writer(s)	Length
1.	"Stories"	Chris Brokaw	6:11
2.	"Point of Egress"	Chris Brokaw	2:12
3.	"Hills"	Chris Brokaw	7:12
Total length:			15:35

CD Version Bonus Tracks
No.	Title	Writer(s)	Length
4.	"Stories" (Instrumental Version)	Chris Brokaw	6:11
5.	"Point of Egress" (Instrumental Version)	Chris Brokaw	2:12
6.	"Hills" (Instrumental Version)	Chris Brokaw	7:04
Total length:			31:02

== Personnel ==
- Chris Brokaw – guitars, percussion, vocals

Additional personnel

- Tim Shea – producer, mixing
- Bob Weston – vinyl cutting
- Dean Styers – photography, cover design
