= The End Is Near (The New Year album) =

Studio album by the New Year
- Released: May 18, 2004
- Recorded: June 7 – August 30, 2003
- Genre: Indie rock
- Length: 33:59
- Label: Touch and Go
- Producer: Matt and Bubba Kadane, Steve Albini

The New Year chronology
| Newness Ends (2001) | The End Is Near (2004) | The New Year (2008) |

Professional ratings
Review scores
| Source | Rating |
|---|---|
| AllMusic | 4/5 stars |
| Pitchfork | (7.0/10) |
| PopMatters | |

The End Is Near is the second studio album by the New Year, released on May 18, 2004, through Touch and Go Records. The album's recording spanned across three sessions in 2003 (June 7–11, July 11–15, and August 29–30) with the help of Steve Albini, and the album was mixed between October and November that same year at The Echo Lab. To promote the album, a music video was produced for the track "Disease".

== Track listing ==
All music is composed by Matt and Bubba Kadane.

| No. | Title | Length |
|---|---|---|
| 1. | "The End's Not Near" | 3:43 |
| 2. | "Sinking Ship" | 3:18 |
| 3. | "Chinese Handcuffs" | 2:44 |
| 4. | "Plan B" | 2:55 |
| 5. | "Disease" | 3:24 |
| 6. | "Age of Conceit" | 3:16 |
| 7. | "Start" | 3:02 |
| 8. | "18" | 7:55 |
| 9. | "Stranger to Kindness" | 3:37 |

== Personnel ==
- Matt Kadane - guitar, vocals, production
- Bubba Kadane - guitar, vocals, production, mixing
- Peter Schmidt - guitar
- Mike Donofrio - bass
- Chris Brokaw - drums
- Steve Albini - recording engineer
- John Golden - mastering
- Matthew Barnhart - mixing
