= Direct Hits =

Direct Hits may refer to:

- Direct Hits (The Who album), 1968
- Direct Hits (The Killers album), 2013
