= The New Year (album) =

Studio album by the New Year
- Released: September 9, 2008
- Recorded: August 2007–2008
- Genre: Indie rock
- Length: 34:30
- Label: Touch and Go
- Producer: Matt and Bubba Kadane

The New Year chronology
The End Is Near (2004)	The New Year (2008)	Snow (2017)

Professional ratings
Review scores
Source	Rating
AllMusic	4.5/5 stars
Pitchfork	7.5/10 stars
Slant	3.5/5 stars

The New Year is the third studio album by indie rock band the New Year, released September 9, 2008 through Touch and Go Records.

== Track listing ==
All music is composed by Matt and Bubba Kadane.

No.	Title	Length
1.	"Folios"	5:09
2.	"The Company I Can Get"	2:48
3.	"X Off Days"	2:49
4.	"The Door Opens"	3:07
5.	"MMV"	3:32
6.	"Seven Days and Seven Nights"	3:30
7.	"Wages of Sleep"	2:59
8.	"Body and Soul"	3:06
9.	"My Neighborhood"	3:35
10.	"The Idea of You"	3:55

== Personnel ==
- Matt Kadane - guitar, vocals, production
- Bubba Kadane - guitar, vocals, production
- Peter Schmidt - guitar
- Mike Donofrio - bass
- Chris Brokaw - drums
- Steve Albini - recording
- Matthew Barnhart - additional recording
- John Golden - mastering
