= Wandering as Water =

Wandering As Water

Studio album by Chris Brokaw
- Released: 2003
- Recorded: October 7, 2003
- Genre: Alternative rock, acoustic rock, folk, alternative folk
- Length: 54:13
- Label: Return to Sender
- Producer: Paul Q. Kolderie

Chris Brokaw chronology
Red Cities (2002)	Wandering As Water (2003)	i was born, but... (soundtrack) (2004)

Professional ratings
Review scores
Source	Rating
AllMusic	3/5 stars
Pitchfork	8.3/10 stars

Wandering As Water is Chris Brokaw's second solo album, the follow-up to 2002's Red Cities. Recorded by Paul Q. Kolderie on February 24, 2003, at Camp Street, Cambridge, Massachusetts, Wandering As Water was released in mid-2003 by Return To Sender Records in Germany. The album was released in a digipak limited edition of 2,000 copies.

Reviewing Wandering As Water, Pitchfork called it "[o]ne of the most overlooked gems of the past year [2003]", going on to assert that Brokaw's "acuity with control and complexity creates a subtle, unspoken poetry." AllMusic stated that although "[t]he acoustic set-up works very well for Brokaw's worn voice, [...] some songs he chose actually suffer from being fleshed out."

"Shoot Me First", "Recidivist", and "German Song" were written and first recorded by Brokaw's previous band, Come, whilst "Embryonic Journey" was composed by Jorma Kaukonen and originally performed by Jefferson Airplane. "Ba-Di-Da" was written by American folk singer-songwriter Fred Neil.

== Track listing ==
No.	Title	Writer(s)	Length
1.	"Cranberries"	Chris Brokaw	3:40
2.	"La Playa"	Chris Brokaw	4:46
3.	"My Idea"	Chris Brokaw and Tom Morgan	2:36
4.	"Calimoxcho"	Chris Brokaw	2:26
5.	"My Confidante"	Chris Brokaw	3:17
6.	"Ba-Di-Da"	Fred Neil	3:15
7.	"Bath House"	Chris Brokaw	2:02
8.	"Shoot Me First"	Come	3:53
9.	"Sagamore Bridge"	Chris Brokaw	4:09
10.	"Embryonic Journey"	Jorma Kaukonen	2:01
11.	"Recidivist"	Come	4:39
12.	"Dresden Promenade"	Chris Brokaw	4:51
13.	"German Song"	Come	5:32
14.	"Bricks"	Chris Brokaw	3:16
15.	"The Fields"	Chris Brokaw	3:47

== Personnel ==
- Chris Brokaw – Acoustic Guitar, Vocals, Tambourine

Additional personnel

- Olaf Meyer – Artwork
- Paul Q. Kolderie – Record producer
- David Michael Curry – Photography
