= Consonant (band) =

American alternative rock band

- Origin: Boston, Massachusetts
- Genre: Alternative rock
- Years active: 2001–?
- Label: Fenway
- Members: Clint Conley; Chris Brokaw; Winston Braman; Matt Kadane

Consonant is an alternative rock group formed by American musician Clint Conley in 2001.

In the late 1970s, Conley cofounded Mission of Burma, a pioneering Boston post punk group, playing bass guitar and singing lead vocals on many songs. Mission of Burma broke up in 1983. While his former bandmates moved on to various projects, Conley mostly dropped out of music for the 1980s and 1990s. In the late 1990s Conley began writing songs again, often with input from poet Holly Anderson.

Conley formed Consonant in 2001, along with guitarist Chris Brokaw (Come, Codeine), bassist Winston Braman (Fuzzy), and drummer Matt Kadane (previously of Bedhead).

Though Consonant was notably less experimental than Mission of Burma, critic Mark Deming declared the new band "a fine return to the spotlight for Conley".

== Discography ==
- Consonant (April 9, 2002)
- Love and Affliction (August 19, 2003)
