= Transaction de Novo =

Studio album by Bedhead
- Released: February 10, 1998
- Recorded: May 2–9, 1997
- Genre: Slowcore
- Length: 36:58
- Label: Trance Syndicate
- Producer: Steve Albini

Bedhead chronology
Beheaded (1996)	Transaction de Novo (1998)	Macha Loved Bedhead (2000)

Transaction de Novo is the third studio album by Bedhead, an American indie rock band. It was released on February 10, 1998, on Trance Syndicate Records, and was the band's only record engineered by Steve Albini. It met with positive reviews.

== History ==
=== Production ===
Bedhead's final LP, Transaction de Novo was recorded from May 2, 1997 to May 9, 1997, and engineered by Steve Albini. In a departure from their usual sound, Transaction De Novo featured more up-tempo, heavily distorted songs than its predecessors.

=== Release ===
Transaction de Novo was released on February 10, 1998, on Trance Syndicate Records.

=== Reception ===
Professional ratings
Review scores
Source	Rating
AllMusic	4.5/5 stars
Pitchfork Media	9.6/10
Tiny Mix Tapes	5/5 stars

AllMusic wrote: "It's hard to imagine the group perfecting this sound much further." The album received a near perfect 9.6/10 score from Pitchfork Media, with the reviewer stating that "over the course of a couple of albums and EPs, Dallas' Bedhead have delivered some of the most lush, gorgeous guitar music of this, or any other decade... One gets to wondering if these people have ever played a bum note, let alone a dud song. Bedhead will make you feel more at peace with yourself. Love them accordingly." The album received a perfect 5/5 score from Tiny Mix Tapes, with the reviewer saying the album "is definitely Bedhead's most earnest release. There is much less distortion and instrumental chaos and more emphasis on concentrated song structures with plaintive, hummable melodies. Despite...extremely minute imperfections, Transaction De Novo proves itself to be one of the most intimate and lush albums ever to grace indie ears. It acts as the album that crowns Bedhead's reign as kings and founders of slowcore."

Conversely, a review in the Austin American-Statesman described Transaction de Novo as "[stumbling] along at an uncomfortably slow pace" with no deviation from the band's previous releases.

== Track listing ==
All tracks are written by Matt and Bubba Kadane.

No.	Title	Length
1.	"Exhume"	4:18
2.	"More Than Ever"	4:19
3.	"Parade"	4:50
4.	"Half-Thought"	3:34
5.	"Extramundane"	3:05
6.	"Forgetting"	3:41
7.	"Lepidoptera"	3:04
8.	"Psychosomatica"	3:16
9.	"The Present"	7:00
Total length:		37:00

== Personnel ==
Musical personnel

- Bubba Kadane - guitar, vocals, producer
- Matt Kadane - guitar, vocals, producer
- Trini Martinez - drums
- Kris Wheat - bass
- Tench Coxe - guitar

Production

- Steve Albini - engineer
