= Macha (band) =

American post-rock band

Macha was an experimental post-rock band from Athens, Georgia composed of brothers Josh McKay (founder/singer/multi-instrumentalist), Mischo McKay (drums/percussion), Kai Reidl (multi-instrumentalist) and Wes Martin (multi-instrumentalist). Macha's music combined the precision tension-and-release post-rock of Mogwai with the lush, hypnotic grind of My Bloody Valentine, along with elements of post-punk, kraut-rock and especially Indonesian Gamelan. The CMJ New Music Report opined that the band "may have invented a new genre - call it Indo-rock." They incorporated a variety of instruments into their sets: Javanese zither, Balinese bamboo flute, hammered dulcimer, Hawaiian slide guitar, talempong nipple gongs and Nepalese shawms, vibraphone, and a 1970s-era thrift-store organ called the Fun Machine.

The band released their self-titled debut album in 1998 for Jetset Records. The album made the top five on both the CMJ and Gavin College Radio Charts. In 1999 they released See It Another Way (Jetset), which held the #1 position on the CMJ College Radio charts for 3 weeks that year. They also teamed up with Bedhead a year later for the mini-album Macha Loved Bedhead (Jetset 2000). Four years since their last full-length, the group returned with Forget Tomorrow (Jetset 2004) expanding their sound and venturing into more dance-music territories.

Josh McKay is currently a member of the indie rock band Deerhunter, and records solo material under the name Abandon the Earth Mission (A.T.E.M.) in Athens.

== Discography ==
=== Albums ===
- 1998: Macha
- 1999: See It Another Way
- 2000: Macha Loved Bedhead
- 2004: Forget Tomorrow
