= Beheaded (album) =

Studio album by Bedhead
- Released: October 24, 1996
- Recorded: July 15–22, 1995
- Studio: The Blank (Austin, Texas)
- Genre: Indie rock, slowcore
- Length: 44:10
- Label: Trance Syndicate
- Producer: Bedhead

Bedhead chronology
WhatFunLifeWas (1994)	Beheaded (1996)	Transaction de Novo (1996)

Professional ratings
Review scores
Source	Rating
AllMusic	4/5 stars
The Austin Chronicle	3/5 stars

Beheaded is the second studio album by Texas-based indie rock band Bedhead, released 1996 through Trance Syndicate. The album was released in the United Kingdom through Rough Trade, and was reissued on compact disc format through Touch & Go Records on February 20, 2001, along with the band's other two albums WhatFunLifeWas and Transaction de Novo. The album was included in the Numero Group's 2014 boxset 1992–1998 and was also released separately on LP format.

== Critical reception ==
CMJ New Music Monthly wrote that the album "reveals the band's mastery of its technique: Matt and Bubba Kadane's whispered, spoken or half-sung vocals trickle through the plodding, strangely dynamic songs, which are bolstered by the band's three-guitar approach, though not in a predictable strength-in-numbers fashion."

== Track listing ==
All tracks are written by Matt and Bubba Kadane.

No.	Title	Length
1.	"Beheaded"	4:44
2.	"The Rest of the Day"	6:20
3.	"Left Behind"	3:48
4.	"What's Missing"	3:49
5.	"Smoke"	2:45
6.	"Burned Out"	3:57
7.	"Roman Candle"	4:30
8.	"Withdraw"	4:23
9.	"Felo de Se"	3:39
10.	"Lares and Penates"	3:53
11.	"Losing Memories"	2:58

== Personnel ==
Adapted from the Beheaded liner notes.

Bedhead

- Kris Wheat – bass
- Trini Martinez – drums
- Bubba Kadane – guitar, vocals ("Left Behind", "Smoke", and "Withdraw")
- Tench Coxe – guitar
- Matt Kadane – guitar, vocals

Production

- John Golden – mastering
- Adam Wiltzie – mixing, recording
- Bedhead – production, recording, mixing

== Release history ==
Region	Date	Label	Format	Catalog
United States	October 24, 1996	Trance Syndicate	CD, LP, CS	TR-50
United Kingdom	October 24, 1996	Rough Trade	CD, LP	R4051
United States	February 20, 2001	Touch & Go Records	CD	TG225
United States	November 11, 2014	The Numero Group	LP	NUM1240
