= Tamikrest =

Malian musical group

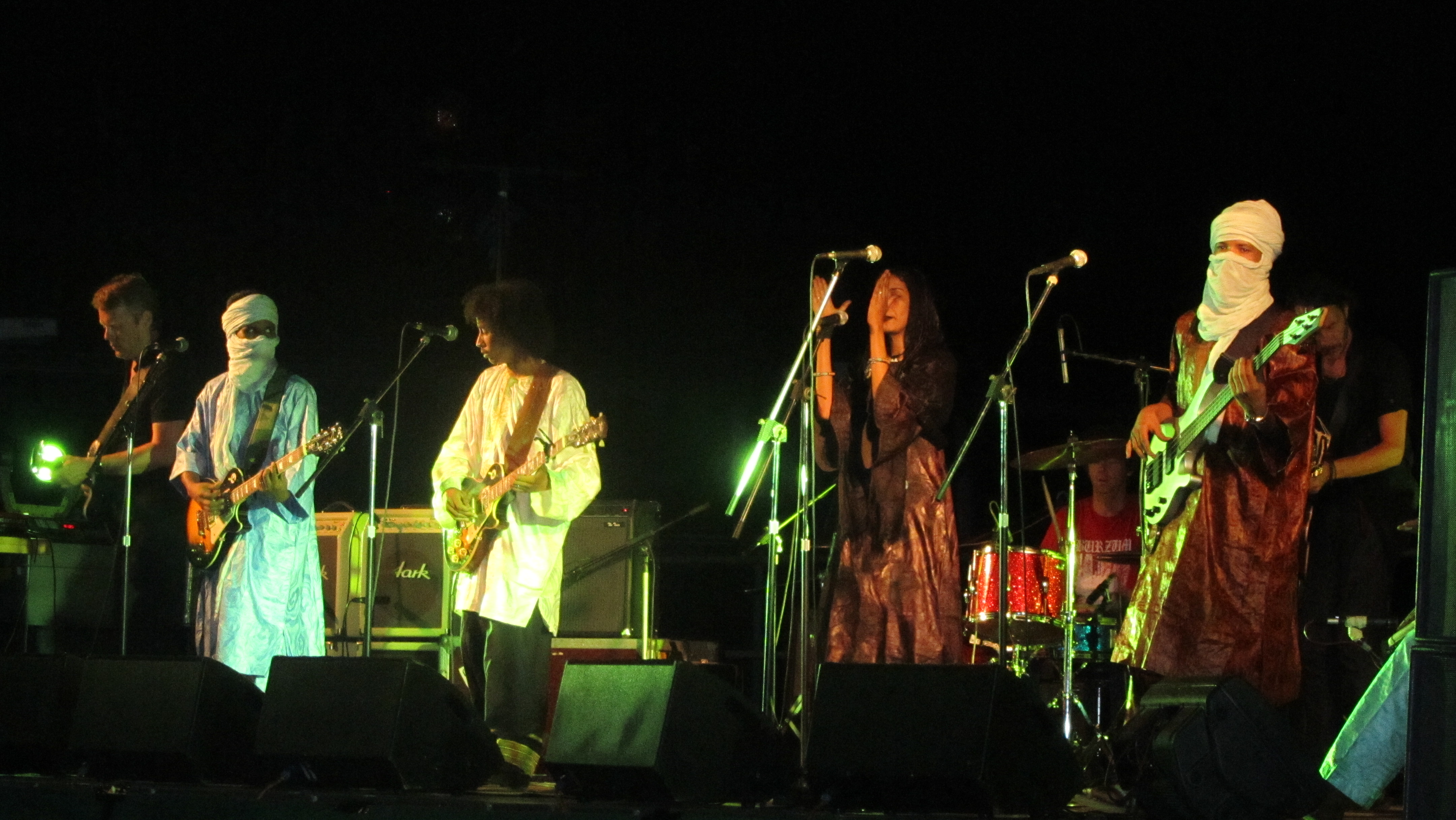
- Tamikrest in concert with Dirtmusic, Azzano San Paolo, Italy, 19 July 2010

Background information
- Origin: Kidal, Mali
- Genres: Desert blues, rock, blues, world music
- Years active: 2006–present
- Label: Glitterbeat
- Members: Ousmane Ag Mossa; Ali Kalghlgh; Cheick Ag Tiglia; Paul Salvagnac; Nicolas Grupp
- Past members: Ibrahim Ag Ahmed Salam; Mahmoud Ag Ahmouden; Mossa Ag Borreiba; Fatma Wallet Cheick; Bassa Wallet Abdamou; Wannou Wallet Sidaty
- Website: www.tamikrest.net

Tamikrest is a Malian rock band formed in 2006 in Tinzawaten, a town on the border between Algeria and Mali, by Ousmane Ag Mossa, Cheikh Ag Tiglia, and Ali Kalghlgh . Influenced by the musical heritage of Tinariwen and motivated by the desire to give a stronger voice to the Kel Tamasheq (Tuareg) people, the group quickly gained recognition.

Their first two albums, "Adagh" (2010) and "Toumastin" (2011), displayed a strong sense of melody and songwriting. The addition of Paul Salvagnac for their third album, "Chatma," contributed to a shift toward a more powerful rock sound. Dedicated to the struggles of women in the Sahara, "Chatma" was acclaimed by music critics as a significant work in the Ishumar music genre and won the Songlines Award for Best Album of the Year in 2013.

With "Kidal" (2017) and "Tamotait" (2020), Tamikrest further emphasized its deep connection to Tamasheq traditions while embracing the energy of rock. The band's music, blending hypnotic trance and melody, is especially impactful in live performances.

Through numerous tours across Europe, Africa, North and South America, Japan, South Korea, and Australia, Tamikrest has established itself as an important figure in African music and on the international rock stage.

== Band history ==
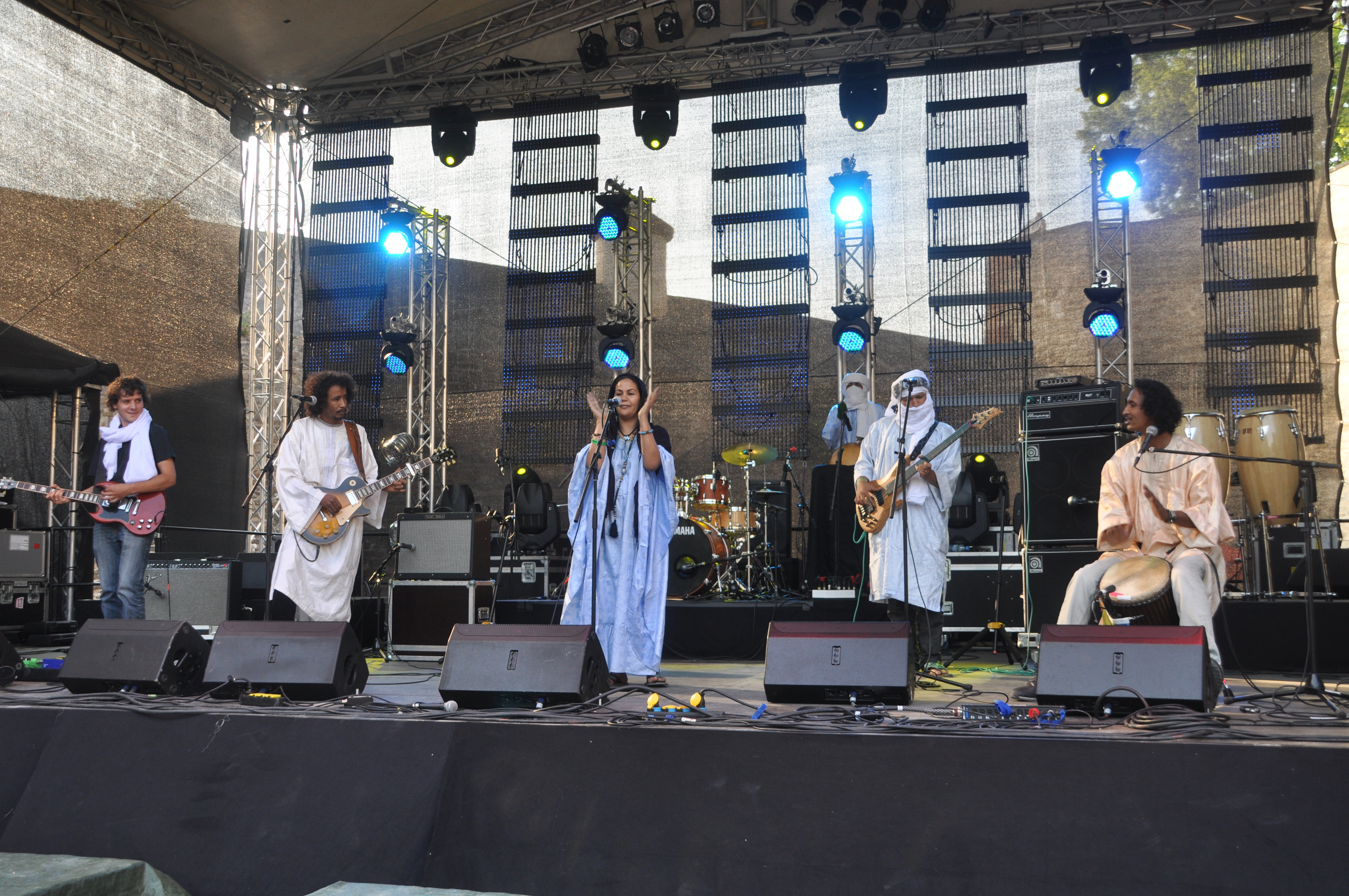
Tamikrest at Weltmusikfestival Horizonte, Koblenz, 2013

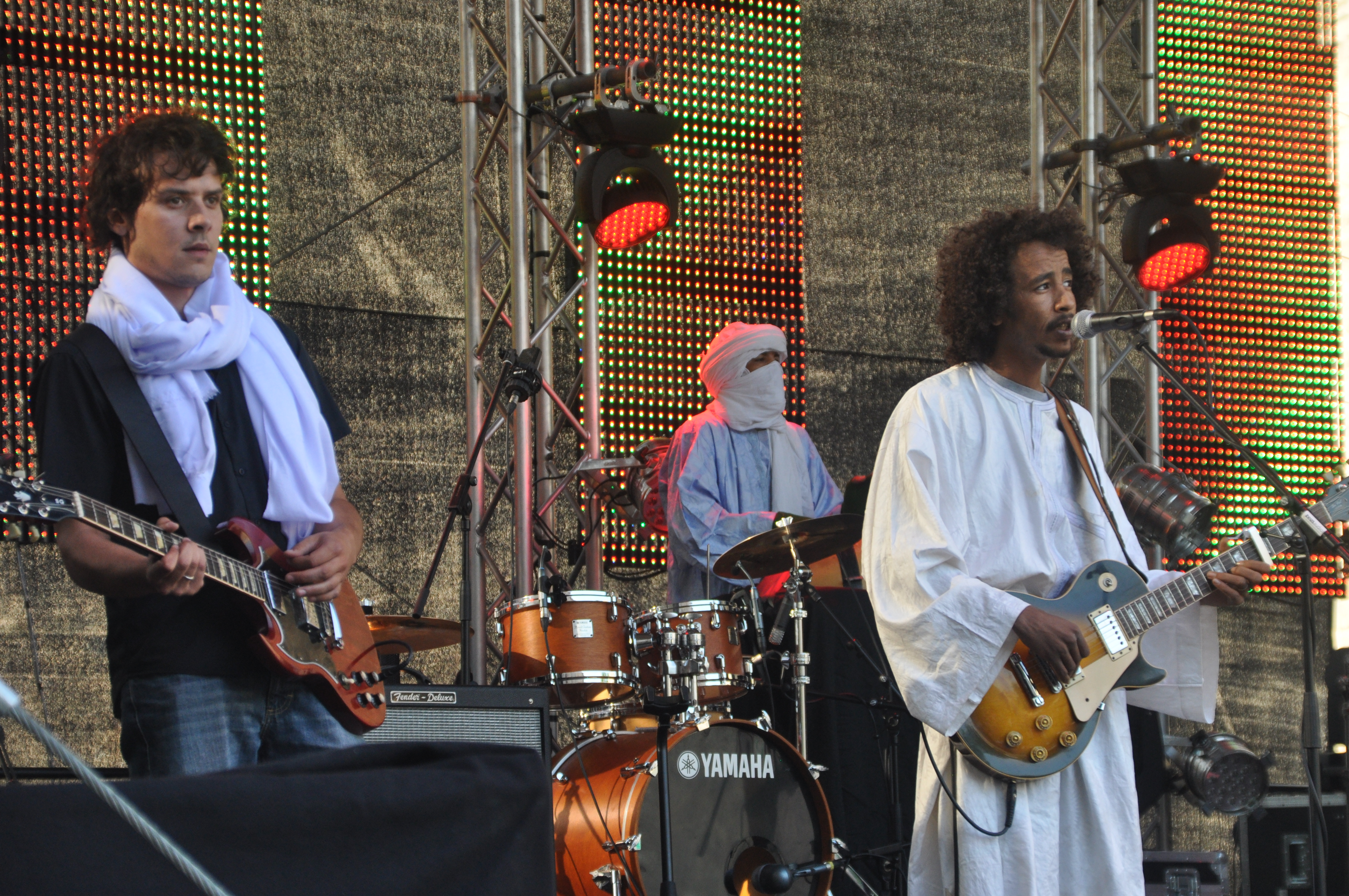
Tamikrest

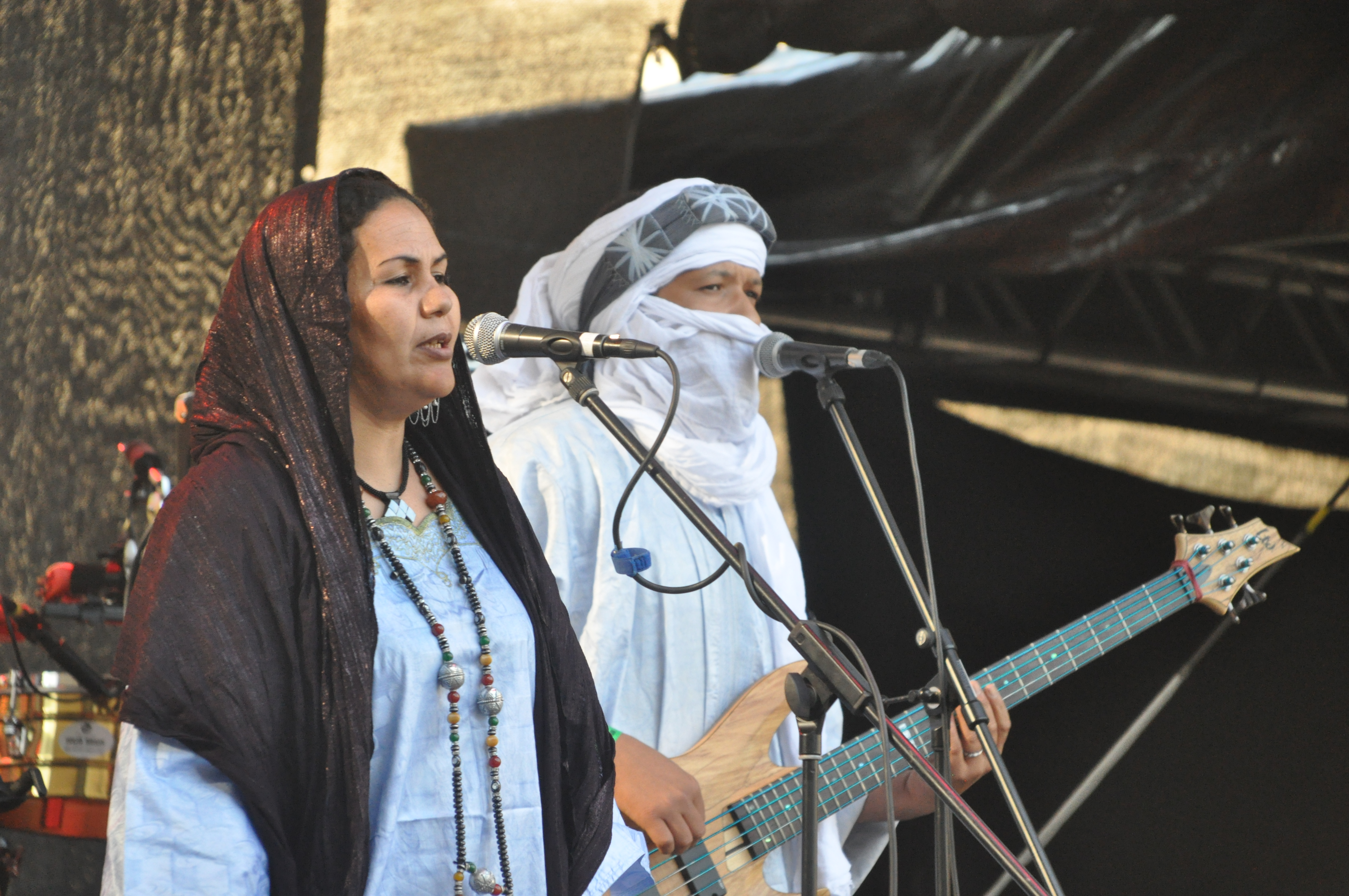
Tamikrest

Tamikrest was founded in 2006 when its members were in their early twenties. They come from the region around Kidal, a city in northern Mali. All of them attended the Les enfants de l'Adrar school in Tinzawaten, a small desert oasis funded by European foundations, where they received their basic musical education. Their youth was marked by the civil war that took place between 1990 and 1995, during which many of their family members and friends died as the Tuareg fought for autonomy. When new conflicts arose in 2006, Ousmane Ag Mossa and his friend Cheick Ag Tiglia decided to advocate for the Tuareg cause through music rather than armed struggle.

In their early years, they played the traditional music of the Kel Tamasheq, as the Tuareg call themselves, as well as the songs of Tinariwen, a Tuareg band that had already blended African traditional music with Western rock in the 1980s. Through the internet and the spread of mp3 culture, the members of Tamikrest discovered artists such as Jimi Hendrix, Bob Marley, Pink Floyd, and Mark Knopfler, all of whom influenced the development of Tamikrest's distinctive sound.

A chance meeting with the American-Australian band Dirtmusic at the Festival au Désert in 2008, held in Essakane near Timbuktu, led to a friendship and musical collaboration. When Dirtmusic recorded their second album, "BKO," in a studio in Bamako in 2010, Tamikrest was invited to contribute to the recording. Chris Eckman, a member of Dirtmusic and The Walkabouts, produced "Adagh," Tamikrest's debut album. In 2010, both bands toured Europe together and performed at festivals such as Sziget and Orange Blossom Special, the latter organized by their label Glitterhouse Records. In October 2010, Chris Eckman also produced Tamikrest's second album, "Toumastin," which was released in April 2011.

== Discography ==
- Adagh (2010, Glitterhouse Records)
- Toumastin (2011, Glitterhouse Records)
- Chatma (2013, Glitterbeat Records)
- Taksera (2015, Glitterbeat Records)
- Kidal (2017, Glitterbeat Records)
- Tamotaït (2020, Glitterbeat Records)
- Assikel (2026, Glitterbeat Records)
