= Fenway Recordings =

Fenway Recordings is an artist management company based in Boston, Massachusetts with offices in New York City and Los Angeles, California. The roster includes Mission of Burma, KUNZITE, and Swim Mountain, as well as co-management for MGMT, The Cribs, and Doves.

== History ==
Fenway was founded in 2001 by Mark Kates. Previously Kates had held an A&R position at Geffen Records before leaving to become the president of the Beastie Boys' Grand Royal Records.

Fenway began as a management company and an independent record label, signing and releasing records by artists including Read Yellow, State Radio, Consonant (Mission of Burma bassist Clint Conley’s other band), The Kickovers (the first act to sign, with former Mighty Mighty Bosstones member Nate Albert and ex-Weezer bassist Mikey Welsh), The Love Scene, Longwave, and Unbusted.

Fenway has also released compilations such as the In Our Lifetime series which has featured the artists My Morning Jacket, Ash, Cave In, Ben Kweller, Rival Schools, and Dropkick Murphys.

Since 2006, the company has stopped releasing records and focused solely on management.

Kates has also collaborated with Red Sox GM Theo Epstein and Peter Gammons' bi-annual concert event Hot Stove Cool Music, which debuted with a show that featured Kay Hanley of Letters To Cleo, Buffalo Tom, Juliana Hatfield, Red Sox stars Bronson Arroyo and Lenny DiNardo and the New York Yankees' Bernie Williams. The Hot Stove Cool Music compilation featured artists including Pearl Jam, Paul Westerberg, and The Allman Brothers Band. This compilation along with a series of benefit concerts has raised over $500,000 for the Jimmy Fund and over $300,000 Epstein’s "Foundation To Be Named Later".

== The Fenway Recording Sessions ==
Since the spring of 2004, Fenway has put on the Fenway Recording Sessions, a series of concerts that has been host to local, national, and international artists. Kates often takes part himself, spinning records between sets as DJ Carbo. Artists like Read Yellow, 7L & Esoteric, and The Love Scene took part in the initial shows, which were held at The Paradise Lounge. The Sessions eventually moved to Great Scott in Allston and have featured The Cribs, Hard-Fi, Echo & The Bunnymen, Kate Nash, Freelance Whales, The Magic Numbers, Arab Strap, The Subways, The Twenty Twos, Editors, Wolfmother, White Lies, Juliana Hatfield & Evan Dando, The Ghost of a Saber Tooth Tiger, and many more. In the winter of 2006, the Sessions began to branch out from the indie rock scene and began booking electronica acts such as Hot Chip, Jamie Liddell, Dabrye, and Diplo.

Since their beginning in 2004, The Fenway Recording Sessions have held over three hundred concerts in and around Boston. A full list of artists who have performed as part of the series is available on the Fenway Recordings website.

Most Sessions now take place at The Brighton Music Hall, ONCE Sommerville, and Cafe 939.

== See also ==
- List of record labels
