= Snow (The New Year album) =

Studio album by the New Year
- Released: April 28, 2017
- Recorded: December 2009–December 2015
- Genre: Indie rock
- Length: 40:12
- Label: Undertow Music
- Producers: Matt Kadane, Bubba Kadane

The New Year chronology
The New Year (2008)	Snow (2017)

Professional ratings
Aggregate scores
Source	Rating
Metacritic	79/100
Review scores
Source	Rating
AllMusic	4/5 stars
The A.V. Club	B−
Blurt	4/5 stars
Paste	8.2/10
Pitchfork	7.4/10
Sputnikmusic	3.5/5 stars
Tiny Mix Tapes	4/5 marks

Snow is the fourth studio album by American indie rock band the New Year. Released on April 28, 2017 through the Undertow Music Collective, it is the first album released by the group since their 2008 self-titled album. It is also the first full-length work by the group to not be issued through Touch & Go Records.

== Track listing ==
All music is composed by Matt and Bubba Kadane.

No.	Title	Length
1.	"Mayday"	3:49
2.	"Snow"	6:08
3.	"Homebody"	2:42
4.	"Recent History"	3:11
5.	"The Last Fall"	4:03
6.	"Myths"	5:33
7.	"The Party's Over"	2:48
8.	"Amnesia"	2:46
9.	"The Beast"	6:25
10.	"Dead And Alive"	2:47

== Personnel ==
- Matt Kadane - guitar, keyboards, vocals, recording, production
- Bubba Kadane - guitar, vocals, recording, production
- Mike Donofrio - bass
- Chris Brokaw - drums
- Steve Albini - recording
- Matthew Barnhart - recording, mastering
- Nicolò Sertorio - photography
