= Overseas (band) =

American indie rock band

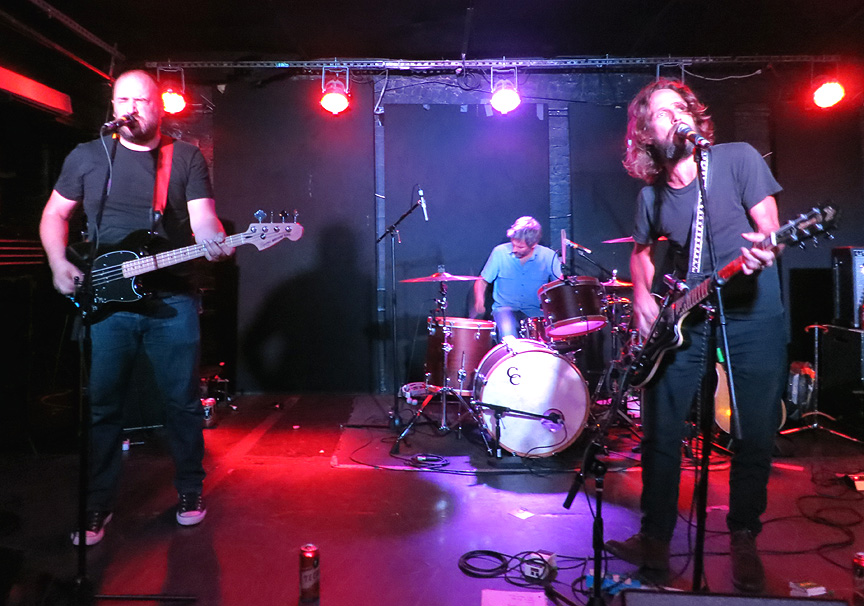
- Overseas performing in 2013

Background information
- Genres: Indie rock
- Years active: 2012–present
- Members: David Bazan; Will Johnson; Bubba Kadane; Matt Kadane
- Website: overseasband.net

Overseas is an American indie rock supergroup that includes David Bazan, Will Johnson, and Bubba & Matt Kadane.

Their debut, self-titled album was released on June 11, 2013. A second record was announced as pending in 2018 on the band's website, but as of 2026, no release has followed.

== Band members ==
- David Bazan – bass, vocals
- Will Johnson – drums, guitar, vocals
- Bubba Kadane – guitar, bass
- Matt Kadane – guitar, bass, drums

== Discography ==
- Overseas (2013)
