= Direct Hit Records =

Record label and store in Dallas, Texas

Direct Hit Records was a record label and store based in Dallas, Texas. The record label is notable for releasing early recordings by North Texas musicians who would eventually go on to prominence at a national level (Darlington (singer) (as the band MESS), Bedhead, Baboon, Brutal Juice, UFOFU, Slowpoke, the Grown-Ups, and Dooms UK). The label went on to release recordings by out-of-Texas artists, including Secession Movement, Malachai and Michael W. Dean, between 1998 and 1999.

The label operated in Dallas's Exposition Park from 1989 to 1995. One critic compared the label's early outlook to other prominent record labels and the cities associated with them: "For a few years, it looked as though Direct Hit could have been to Dallas what Sub Pop was to Seattle or Twin/Tone was to Minneapolis-St. Paul."
