= The Promise Ring discography =

Band discography

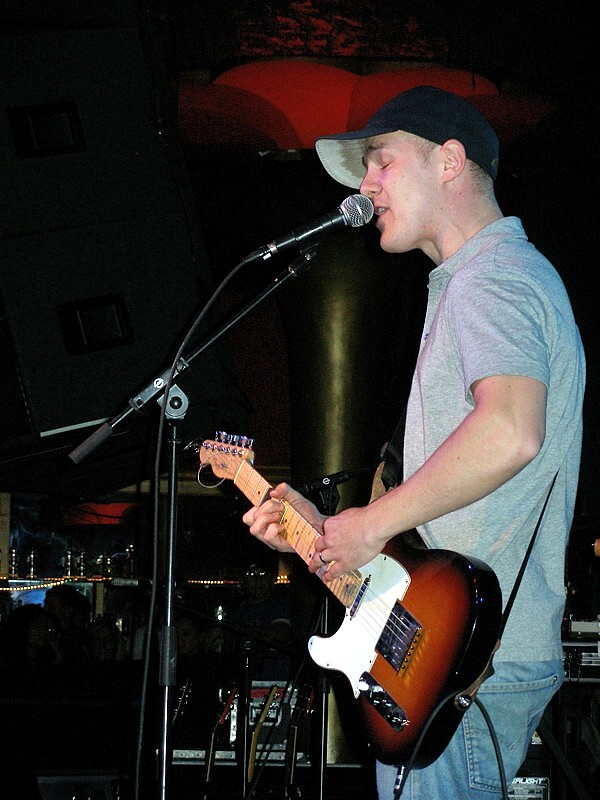
- Frontman Davey von Bohlen in 2007
- Studio albums: 4
- EPs: 6
- Singles: 2
- Music videos: 3

The discography of the Promise Ring, an American rock band, consists of four studio albums, six extended plays and two singles.

== Studio albums ==
List of studio albums
Title	Details
30° Everywhere	Released: September 10, 1996; Label: Jade Tree; Format: CD, DL, LP
Nothing Feels Good	Released: October 14, 1997; Label: Jade Tree; Format: CD, CS, DL, LP
Very Emergency	Released: September 28, 1999; Label: Jade Tree; Format: CD, DL, LP
Wood/Water	Released: April 23, 2002; Label: Anti-; Format: CD, DL, LP

== Extended plays ==
List of extended plays
Title	Details
The Promise Ring	Released: March 1995; Label: Self-released; Format: CS
Falsetto Keeps Time	Released: February 9, 1996; Label: Jade Tree; Format: 7" vinyl
The Promise Ring/Texas Is the Reason (split)	Released: May 10, 1996; Label: Jade Tree; Format: 7" vinyl
The Horse Latitudes	Released: February 11, 1997; Label: Jade Tree; Format: CD, DL, 12" vinyl
Boys + Girls	Released: October 27, 1998; Label: Jade Tree; Format: CD, DL, 7" vinyl
Electric Pink	Released: May 16, 2000; Label: Jade Tree; Format: CD, DL

== Singles ==
List of singles, showing associated albums
Title	Year	Album
"Watertown Plank"/"Mineral Point"	1995	Non-album single
"Stop Playing Guitar"	2002	Wood/Water

== Other appearances ==
List of other song appearances, showing associated albums
Title	Year	Album
"Ooh Do I Love You"	1996	Ooh Do I Love You
"Pink Chimneys"	1997	(Don't Forget To) Breathe
"Red Paint" (live)	1997	The Basement Recordings – Live At Cicero's
"Gouge Away" (Pixies cover)	1999	Where Is My Mind?: A Tribute to the Pixies
"You Are So Unreal" (Metroschifter cover)	2000	Encapsulated
"Holiday Adam"	2000	A Very Milky Christmas
"Easy"	2002	Location Is Everything Vol. 1

== Music videos ==
List of music videos, showing directors
Title	Year	Director(s)
"Why Did Ever We Meet"	1997	Darren Doane
"Emergency! Emergency!"	1999	Darren Doane
"Stop Playing Guitar"	2002	Arni + Kinski
