= Davey von Bohlen =

American musician and songwriter (born 1975)

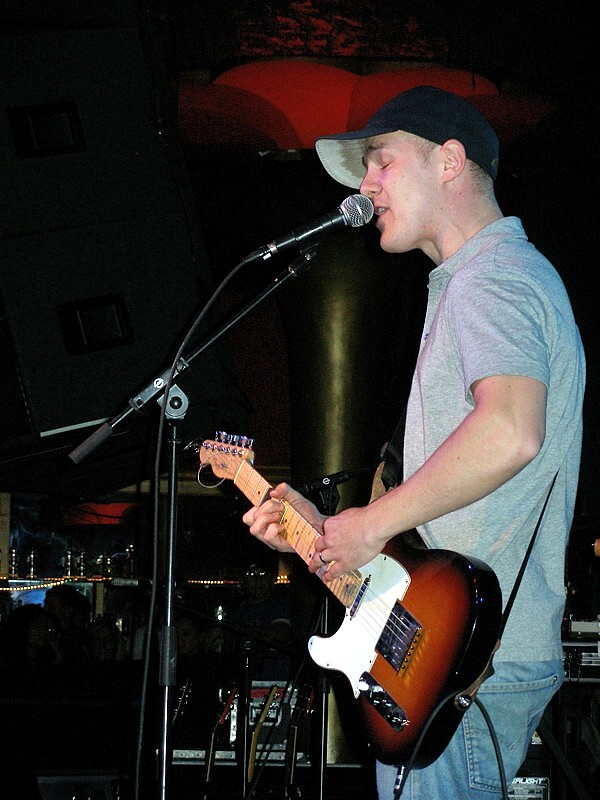
- Bohlen performing in 2007

Background information
- Born: August 11, 1975 (age 50)
- Origin: Milwaukee, Wisconsin, U.S.
- Genres: Emo; indie rock; pop punk; power pop; acoustic rock
- Years active: 1993–present
- Labels: Foreign Leisure; DeSoto; Flameshovel; Grand Hotel van Cleef; Jade Tree

Davey von Bohlen (born August 11, 1975) is an American musician and songwriter. He is best known for serving as lead vocalist and guitarist of the emo band The Promise Ring and also as guitarist and backing vocalist in Cap'n Jazz originally from 1993 to 1995.

He has also participated in the bands Vermont, and most recently, Maritime.

== Musical career ==
=== Cap'n Jazz ===
Short-lived but highly influential, Cap'n Jazz helped transform emo from an underground punk subgenre into a more widely accepted subset of indie rock. The band quickly earned a cult following around Chicago and the Midwest, which would later spread to the rest of the US and the world after and around the time of the band's demise. Their unique sound, along with the fact that their recordings were relatively scarce, helped solidify their status as an underground legend. The band split in 1995 and their stature continued to grow. A double CD retrospective, entitled Analphabetapolothology, was posthumously released in 1998. Davey von Bohlen maintained the highest profile of any ex-Cap'n Jazzer, living in Milwaukee and founding the Promise Ring, which became one of the most popular emo bands of the '90s. Cap'n Jazz played an unannounced 5 song set in Chicago in January 2010, the first time all five members had been together since 1995, and later played 10 sold out summer shows across the US.

=== The Promise Ring ===
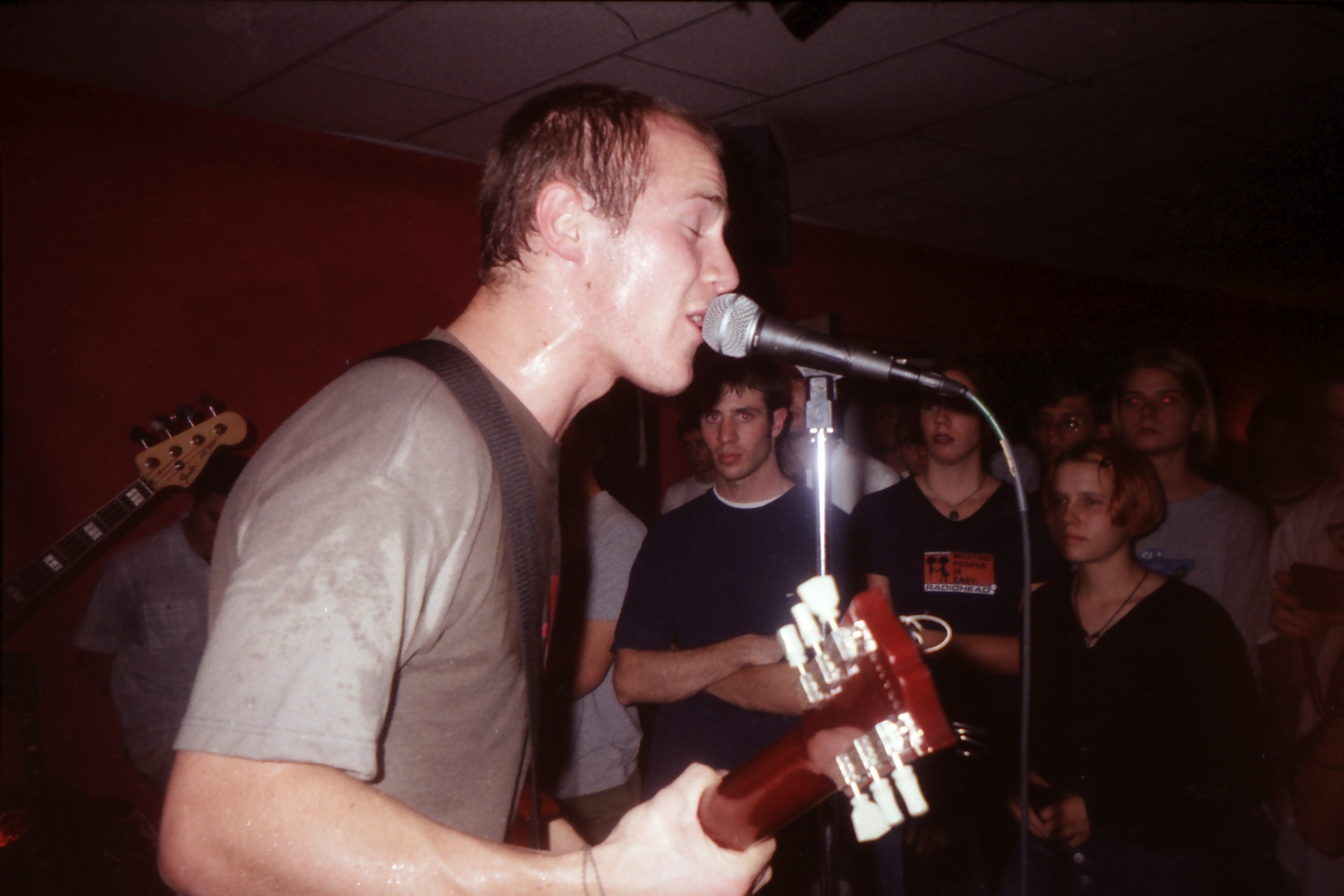
Bohlen performing in 1997

The Promise Ring is an American emo band from Milwaukee, Wisconsin. In their early years, their music was usually classified as emo, but their later albums could be described more accurately as indie pop.[1] The band was started in 1994 as a side project by Davey von Bohlen during his time as a guitarist/vocalist for Cap'n Jazz. Von Bohlen started the project alongside guitarist Jason Gnewikow of None Left Standing, drummer Dan Didier and bassist Scott Beschta, the latter two both being former members of Ceilishrine [2]. The Promise Ring released their first full-length album in 1996 and gained a following in the US, Europe and Japan with this and subsequent albums. In 1998 von Bohlen created Tornado Country Music Publishing and continues to serve as owner. The Promise Ring is often credited as playing a major role in the creation of the emo sound and the band was known for vibrant live shows. Nothing Feels Good is their second album and was the band's first real hit and gained it a following, being praised by everyone from SPIN magazine to MTV. The band achieved a popular single with "Why Did Ever We Meet?". The title of this album was used as a title for the book Nothing Feels Good: Punk Rock, Teenagers, and Emo by Andy Greenwald. Following their final release in 2002, The Promise Ring decided to move on to new projects, including von Bohlen's and Didier's new band named Maritime.

Over the years, von Bohlen and his TPR bandmates have endured many life-threatening events. During a 1997 Promise Ring tour, the band's van encountered black ice, resulting in a wreck that ejected all the band members on board and placed them in the hospital. von Bohlen was ejected through the windshield but sustained what were thought to be minor injuries. Prior to the recording of The Promise Ring's final album wood/water in April 2001, von Bohlen was diagnosed with a fist-sized meningioma which had been causing severe, crippling headaches and illness for two years and believed to be related to head trauma sustained in the accident. The fist-sized brain tumor was successfully removed and deemed benign, but a staph infection, which caused von Bohlen to pass out on stage and required two additional surgeries to remove an infected palm sized piece of his skull and to replace it a year later, prevented the band from touring for a substantial amount of time. Since then, von Bohlen appears to have a clean bill of health and has resumed recording and touring.

On November 22, 2011, it was announced that The Promise Ring was reforming for a tour and possibly new material.

=== Maritime ===
Maritime formed in 2003 out of the ashes of The Promise Ring and The Dismemberment Plan, initially composed of singer/guitarist Davey von Bohlen, drummer Dan Didier (of The Promise Ring) and bassist Eric Axelson (of The Dismemberment Plan). Maritime has released five full-length albums, Glass Floor in 2004, We, the Vehicles in 2006, Heresy and the Hotel Choir in 2007, “Human Hearts” in 2011, and “Magnetic Bodies / Maps of Bones” in 2015. Axelson left the band in 2006 and was replaced by Justin Klug on bass and Dan Hinz was added on guitar. The band has toured each album across the US, Europe (Grand Hotel Van Cleef Records) and Japan. In late April, 2010, the band announced that they were leaving Flameshovel Records and had signed with Dangerbird Records. On April 5, 2011 the band released Human Hearts. Maritime's next album, Magnetic Bodies/Maps of Bones was released on October 16, 2015. It is currently not known whether the band will have another album or not.

Von Bohlen also sang in his longtime friends' and former tour mates, Jimmy Eat World song, "A Praise Chorus." earning him a platinum record. The song references such classics as The Kinks' "A Rock 'n' Roll Fantasy", They Might Be Giants' "Don't Let's Start", The Promise Ring's "Why Did Ever We Meet" and Crimson and Clover by Tommy James and the Shondells.

== Discography ==
=== Ten Boy Summer ===
- Demo Tape (1993)
- A Food Not Bombs Benefit LP (1994, Inchworm)

=== Cap'n Jazz ===
- Shmap'n Shmazz
- Analphabetapolothology – 2xCD (Jade Tree Records, 1998).

=== Promise Ring albums ===
See: Category:The Promise Ring albums

- 30° Everywhere (1996)
- Horse Latitudes (1997)
- Nothing Feels Good (1997)
- Very Emergency (1999)
- wood/water (2002)

=== Promise Ring EPs ===
- Falsetto Keeps Time (1996)
- Boys + Girls (1998)
- Electric Pink (2000)

=== Vermont albums ===
- Living Together (1999)
- Mark Mallman and Vermont (2001)
- Calling Albany (2002)

=== Maritime albums ===
- Adios EP (2003)
- Glass Floor (2004)
- We, the Vehicles (2006)
- Heresy and the Hotel Choir (2007)
- Human Hearts (2011)
- Magnetic Bodies, Maps of Bones (2015)
