= Do You Know Who You Are? =

Studio album by Texas Is the Reason
- Released: April 30, 1996
- Recorded: December 1995
- Studio: Oz, Baltimore, Maryland
- Genre: Emo; post-hardcore; indie rock
- Length: 37:42; 68:02 (Reissue)
- Label: Revelation
- Producer: J. Robbins, Texas Is the Reason

Texas Is the Reason chronology
Texas Is the Reason (1995)	Do You Know Who You Are? (1996)	Texas Is the Reason/The Promise Ring (1996)

Do You Know Who You Are? is the only studio album by American rock band Texas Is the Reason. After finalizing their line-up, they wrote and released their self-titled debut EP in late 1995. Following that, they began recording their debut album at Oz Studios in Baltimore, Maryland, co-producing it with Jawbox member J. Robbins. Preceded by an east coast tour with labelmates Gameface, Do You Know Who You Are? was released on April 30, 1996 through Revelation Records. It was promoted with a European tour with Samiam, two US tours (one with labelmates Sense Field, the other with the Promise Ring), and a tour of Germany with Queerfish and Starmarket. Shortly after the Germany stint, the group broke up.

Do You Know Who You Are? is a emo, indie rock and post-hardcore release, drawing comparisons to Jawbox and Hüsker Dü. The album's title is reportedly the final words John Lennon heard as he was dying; some of the songs allude to John F. Kennedy assassination conspiracy theories. The record received a generally positive reaction from music critics, some of whom commented on frontman Garrett Klahn's vocals. Do You Know Who You Are? became Revelation Records' best-selling release, and has appeared on several best-of lists for the emo genre by the likes of Kerrang!, NME and Rolling Stone.

== Background and production ==
Guitarist Norman Brannon joined the hardcore punk band Shelter in 1992, amidst the New York hardcore scene of the time. Wishing to move away from the macho elements and religious preaching of the genre, he wanted to form a new band with former 108 drummer Chris Daly as early as December 1992, though was unable to at the time. 108 and Shelter would tour together in mid-1993; the pair had previously played in hardcore band Resurrection sometime earlier. Bassist Scott Winegard of Fountainhead was left band-less when that act's guitarist left to form Orange 9mm. Bassist Garrett Klahn was kicked out of Copper in January 1995, while Brannon had formed a new band the following month. Winegard was drafted into Brannon's act; Klahn visited them during practice that same month, before joining them when he switched to vocals and guitar in March 1995. While talking to their friends in the Van Pelt, the members asked them what names they rejected before settling on their final name – one of which being Texas Is the Reason. After acquiring this name, which is also a line in the song "Bullet" by the Misfits, the band began writing material for their debut EP.

The group had their first show at the Equal Vision Records house in New York City, which was run by Shelter frontman Ray Cappo. They recorded a three-track demo tape, and spent sometime playing shows locally and appearing on the North-eastern touring circuit. Soon afterwards, the band had the choice of signing with independent labels Jade Tree, Art Monk Construction and Revelation Records (which was co-founded by Cappo), or major label Atlantic Records. All of their friends expected the band to sign with Equal Vision, including its founder; they had agreed not to sign with a label any of their previous bands had been on. Every member of the band learned from business mistakes with their past acts; Brannon wanted to work with a person he knew. He had met Revelation's other co-founder Jordan Cooper prior to forming Texas Is the Reason, and had talked with him on a few occasions. Cooper had heard positive things about the band, at which point Brannon sent him a copy of the demo tape. Ultimately, the group went with Revelation Records for a multi-album contract, after learning about the label's distribution system and their longevity up to that point. Despite this, they had offers from other labels to buy out their deal, going as far as to hire limos and hotel rooms to impress the band.

Around this time, Brannon wrapped up working on his fanzine Anti-Matter to focus more of his efforts on Texas Is the Reason. Released in November 1995 through Revelation, the self-titled three-track EP was an underground success. It aided to separate the group from their peers due in part to Klahn's vocals and stage persona. A fourth song recorded during the sessions of the EP was released on a split single with Samuel on the British independent label Simba. They had wanted to record a song with Jawbox member J. Robbins for the split instead; Brannon previously met Robbins when he interviewed him for Anti-Matter, and would stay in contact with him. They learned through a mutual friend that Robbins had an eight-track recorder in his home studio, though they were unable to record anything Robbins told the band he still wanted to work with them on a project; when they were preparing to work on their debut, Robbins was interested. In December 1995, the group went to Oz Studio in Baltimore, Maryland to record their debut album, with the producer role being split between Robbins and the band. Drew Mazurek handled recording, with assistance from M. Rippe. Mazurek mixed the recordings, before they were mastered by Vlad Meller at Sony Music Studios in New York City.

== Composition ==
Musically, the sound of Do You Know Who You Are? has been described as emo, post-hardcore indie rock, and Midwest emo, drawing comparison to Jawbox and Hüsker Dü. Klahn's vocals were compared to Richard Marx if he sang indie rock, with a mixture of the nasal whine of Oasis frontman Liam Gallagher and the raspy nature of Modest Mouse vocalist Issac Brock. Robbins contributed strings and percussion to the recordings. The album's title is reportedly the final words John Lennon heard as he was dying en route to a hospital. Some of the tracks allude to John F. Kennedy assassination conspiracy theories; the title of "The Magic Bullet Theory" being a direct reference.

The opening track "Johnny on the Spot" starts with drum, guitar and bass triads that were used by typical emo acts of the day, before incorporating syncopated rhythms. "Nickel Wound" was the most archetypal example of emo on the record, with its slow guitar work and marching drum patterns, prior to the guitars erupting into heavy distortion and later returning to the slow introduction. "Something to Forget (Version II)" was re-recorded from its original release ("Something to Forget (Version I)") on the split with Samuel, and is slightly shorter than that version. Brannon wanted the album to open with its title-track but was vetoed by the rest of the group. The song is a slow instrumental that builds to a lot of distortion, eventually giving way to the hardest track on the record, "Back and to the Left". The song, which has an aggressive rhythm section, features a line of lyrics taken from labelmates Gameface's track "Three". Gameface, in turn, referenced "Back and to the Left" in their song "Laughable" (2000). "A Jack with One Eye" was written in Daly's basement; Brannon's reaction to it was "thinking that this song is the next level, like this is a real song."

== Release and reception ==
=== Promotion and touring ===
Texas Is the Reason embarked on a three-week tour along the West Coast and Midwest, their first ever trek, with Shift. In March 1996, the group then went on an east coast tour with labelmates Gameface, leading up to the release of Do You Know Who You Are? on April 30; Antarctica member Glenn Maryansky designed the artwork. Following this, the group release a split single with the Promise Ring in May through Jade Tree. In May and June, the group embarked on a tour of Europe with Samiam. After returning to the US, they went on a cross-country trek with labelmates Sense Field in June and July. Between late December and February 1997, the band went on a six-week US tour with the Promise Ring, with support on select dates by Rocketscienece and Sweetbelly Freakdown. Following this, they went on a tour of Germany with Queerfish and Starmarket in February and March. The group broke up not long after due to interpersonal tension. The album was reissued as a retrospective compilation title Do You Know Who You Are?: The Complete Collection in February 2013.

=== Critical response and legacy ===
Professional ratings
Review scores
Source	Rating
AllMusic	4.5/5 stars
The Encyclopedia of Popular Music	4/5 stars
The Great Indie Discography	7/10
Kerrang!	3/5 stars
Punknews.org	5/5 stars

Do You Know Who You Are? went on to become Revelation Records' best-selling release. The album is a classic staple of the emo and post-hardcore genres, and would go on to influence the likes of Pale, That Very Time I Saw, Dashboard Confessional, Basement and Citizen. Kyle Ryan of The A.V. Club considered it, alongside Frame & Canvas (1998) by Braid and Nothing Feels Good (1997) by the Promise Ring, to be one of the defining releases of emo's second wave. Do You Know Who You Are? has appeared on various best-of emo album lists by The Daily Dot, Kerrang!, LA Weekly, NME, Rolling Stone, and Spin, as well as by journalists Leslie Simon and Trevor Kelley in their book Everybody Hurts: An Essential Guide to Emo Culture (2007). Similarly, "Back and to the Left" appeared on a best-of emo songs list by NME and Vulture.

Do You Know Who You Are? received generally positive reviews from music critics. AllMusic reviewer Kurt Morris said the "unique angle" of Klahn's voice was "warm enough to draw one in, while not being overbearing to the point of annoyance." The lyrics created an "atmosphere that invites tremendous one-liners and memorable songs." Though they lacked the technicality of DC hardcore and the poppy nature of acts that would follow them, the group "provided the indie rock scene with a combination of all the elements that it took to produce a quality indie rock record." PopMatters writer Douglas Shoback said that while they came across as a standard emo act, they managed to avoid "the common pitfalls surrounding emo", namely the "macho hardcore sound[, ...] aesthetic ... [and] overly melodic preaching". Shoback complimented Klahn's vocals as being "the best instrument" in the group, being able to "hold a note and make it sound unique." Will Dandy of Punk Planet called it "good, it's calming but really powerful and melodic". Punknews.org staff member Joe Pelone said it was "filler free", though criticized Klahn's voice for "a little nasal in spots, but this is still a phenomenal record". Ox-Fanzine's Joachim Hiller said he was "not disappointed", and referred to it as music for "lazy HC veterans who dream of buying a house in the country and have also become quite reasonable otherwise".

=== Accolades ===
Publication	Country	Accolade	Year	Rank
Spin	United States	Emossentials	1999	8
LA Weekly	United States	Top 20 Emo Albums in History	2013	4
NME	United Kingdom	20 Emo Albums That Have Resolutely Stood The Test Of Time	2015	12
The Daily Dot	United States	The best emo albums of 1996	2016	2
Rolling Stone	United States	40 Greatest Emo Albums of All Time	2016	12
Kerrang!	United Kingdom	The 20 best pre-2000s emo albums	2020	N/A
Kerrang!	United Kingdom	The 25 greatest emo albums ever	2021	23

== Track listing ==
All songs by Texas Is the Reason.

Original Release
No.	Title	Length
1.	"Johnny on the Spot"	4:15
2.	"The Magic Bullet Theory"	2:48
3.	"Nickel Wound"	4:36
4.	"There's No Way I Can Talk Myself Out of This One Tonight (The Drinking Song)"	3:57
5.	"Something to Forget"	5:50
6.	"Do You Know Who You Are?"	2:43
7.	"Back and to the Left"	3:55
8.	"The Day's Refrain"	4:59
9.	"A Jack with One Eye"	4:39
Total length:		37:42

2013 Complete Edition
No.	Title	Length
1.	"Johnny on the Spot"	4:16
2.	"The Magic Bullet Theory"	2:49
3.	"Nickel Wound"	4:37
4.	"There's No Way I Can Talk Myself Out Of This One Tonight (The Drinking Song)"	3:58
5.	"Something To Forget (Version II)"	5:51
6.	"Do You Know Who You Are?"	2:43
7.	"Back And To The Left"	3:55
8.	"The Day's Refrain"	4:59
9.	"A Jack With One Eye"	4:40
10.	"Every Little Girl's Dream"	6:06
11.	"When Rock 'N' Roll Was Just A Baby"	3:21
12.	"Blue Boy"	4:11
13.	"Something To Forget (Version I)"	6:17
14.	"If It's Here When We Get Back It's Ours"	2:26
15.	"Dressing Cold"	2:49
16.	"Antique"	5:04
Total length:		68:02

== Personnel ==
Personnel per booklet.

Texas Is the Reason

- Garrett Klahn – guitar, vocals
- Chris Daly – drums
- Scott Winegard – bass
- Norman Brannon – guitar

Additional musicians

- J. Robbins – additional strings, percussion

Production

- J. Robbins – producer
- Texas Is the Reason – producer
- Drew Mazurek – recording, mixing
- M. Rippe – assistant engineer
- Vlad Meller – mastering
- John Mockus – photography
- Glenn Maryansky – art direction, design
- T.D. Kline – layout
