= Wood/Water =

Studio album by the Promise Ring
- Released: April 23, 2002
- Recorded: 2001
- Studios: Jacobs, Farnham; Sonora; MCJ Sound; Polish Moon, Milwaukee, Wisconsin
- Genres: Alternative country; indie rock; pop
- Length: 51:49
- Label: Anti-
- Producers: Stephen Street; Mario Caldato Jr.

The Promise Ring chronology
Very Emergency (1999)	Wood/Water (2002)

Singles from Wood/Water
- 1. "Stop Playing Guitar" Released: July 9, 2002

Wood/Water is the fourth and final studio album by American rock band the Promise Ring. It was released by Anti- on April 23, 2002. While touring in support of their third studio album, Very Emergency (1999), the Promise Ring were due to leave for a European tour; frontman Davey von Bohlen was diagnosed with meningioma on the day of departure. As a result of a post-surgical infection, the band could not tour for the remainder of 2000. In early 2001, the Promise Ring made demos with Kristian Riley, and then recorded a track with producer Mario Caldato Jr. in Los Angeles, California. The Promise Ring flew to the UK for six weeks of recording with Stephen Street, before returning to Milwaukee, Wisconsin for further recording. The album moved away from the emo sound of the band's past works into alternative country, indie rock, and pop territory.

Wood/Water received generally favorable reviews from music critics, many of whom praised the reinvention of the Promise Ring's sound. Before the band promoted it, Bohlen had additional surgery. They embarked on an accompanying US tour, which featured touring keyboardist William Seidel. The music video for "Stop Playing Guitar" was released in May 2002; the song was released as the album's lead single two months later. The Promise Ring appeared on Late Night with Conan O'Brien in May 2002, before supporting Jimmy Eat World on a UK tour; a US support slot for Jimmy Eat World followed in July and August of that year. The band performed for the 2002 Plea for Peace tour prior to breaking up in mid-October that same year.

== Background and recording ==
=== Writing and Bohlen's illness ===
The Promise Ring released their third studio album Very Emergency in September 1999 on independent record label Jade Tree, fulfilling their three-album contract with the label. The album expanded the band's fan base and received some airplay on college radio. Vocalist-guitarist Davey von Bohlen and drummer Dan Didier worked as part of the acoustic side project Vermont around this time; Vermont also released their second studio album Living Together in September 1999. The Promise Ring were tired of playing what drummer Dan Didier called "those stripped down power type songs" while touring to promote Very Emergency in February 2000, and released their sixth EP Electric Pink in May of that year. Although the band were then scheduled to leave for a two-month European tour, Bohlen was diagnosed with meningioma on the day of departure.

With the tour having been canceled, Bohlen had surgery; the Promise Ring took the next few months off for his recuperation, and to work on new material. The band then supported Bad Religion on tour, and around this time, guitarist Jason Gnewikow said they had five new songs which were closer in style to their second studio album Nothing Feels Good (1997) than Very Emergency. Bohlen developed a post-surgical infection that forced the Promise Ring to drop out of the Bad Religion tour, and made them unable to tour for the rest of 2000. Although they had planned to write and record, the band members spent little time together. Gnewikow worked at his graphics company, while Bohlen and Didier focused on Vermont, and Didier relaxed with his family. The Promise Ring brought recording equipment to their rehearsal room, which allowed Didier and Gnewikow to experiment for hours at a time.

=== Pre-production and label change ===
In February 2001, the Promise Ring went to Bionic Studios in Milwaukee, Wisconsin to work on material with Kristian Riley of Citizen King. Pre-production was done for "Stop Playing Guitar", "Wake Up April", "My Life Is at Home" and "Say Goodbye Good"; the session resulted in songs that differed in style from those on Very Emergency. The band was no longer signed to Jade Tree by March 2001, and signed with the Epitaph Records imprint Anti- later that year. In April and May 2001, the band went on a short tour with Camden; by this point, William Seidel joined as a touring keyboardist. Later in May 2001, the band demoed material on Pro Tools, which marked a change from their previous process of jamming when rehearsing, playing songs live and recording them as quickly as possible in the studio. They attempted to reinvent their sound, although initially wrote material in the vein of Very Emergency. After some difficulty, the Promise Ring re-evaluated and decided to write material at a steady pace.

Epitaph Records contacted the Promise Ring when it became known that they would not release their next album on Jade Tree. The record label contacted the band's manager, but the band had little interest due to their unpleasant appearance on tour with Bad Religion. Epitaph was also primarily known for one style: Californian pop punk. Brett Gurewitz of Bad Religion, who founded Epitaph, flew the Promise Ring out to Los Angeles, California. Although he wanted them to sign with Epitaph, the Promise Ring wanted to record for Anti- because they were more familiar with the imprint; it featured artists, such as Tom Waits, Tricky and Merle Haggard, who did not fit into Epitaph's roster.

Anti- was understanding, since it was aware that the band wanted to move away from the emo genre. The Promise Ring also wanted more money than Jade Tree could offer, which was the main reason they left the label. Bohlen said that the band and Jade Tree "became more or less synonymous," and they wanted to distance themselves from the record label's sound. Another issue was Jade Tree's reluctance to license the Promise Ring's releases to labels in other countries. The band had to convince Jade Tree to license Electric Pink to Epitaph imprint Burning Heart Records for European release, and to license their albums in Japan, where the Promise Ring were becoming more popular.

== Production ==
The Promise Ring wanted to work with Stephen Street because they thought he could understand the sound they wanted to create. Didier, Bohlen and Gnewikow were fans of the Smiths and Blur, both of whom Street had produced for. Since Street did not want to fly to the US, the Promise Ring flew to the UK to record with him. The band performed their existing material to Street at the producer's house. At that point, many of the songs, such as "Wake Up April", were finished, though Street worked closely with the band on others, such as "Size of Your Life" and "Become One Anything One Time". According to Didier, Street "was definitely an integral part of making [the two songs] work."

The band were in the process of finalizing details when Street went on vacation, and they had no way to communicate with him. Beginning to panic about their budget, the Promise Ring decided to split the recording between Street in the UK and Mario Caldato Jr. in Los Angeles. The band went to Los Angeles in mid-2001 and tracked "Say Goodbye Good" at Sonora Studios and MCJ Sound with Caldato producing; Robert Carranza handled recording. The song features bassist Scott Schoenbeck, who was unhappy with the change of sound and unenthusiastic about being in a band. He was replaced by Ryan Weber of Camden for the remainder of Wood/Water's recording. When Street returned from vacation, he said that he would charge less than his usual fee, and the band sent him demos of material they had recorded. They flew to the UK and went to Street's house, playing him the songs' session files.

Street and the Promise Ring then went to Farnham and recorded at Jacobs Studios, a converted farmhouse. The band stayed above the studio, and waited every morning for Street to arrive and listen to the recordings from each previous day. He and Cenzo Townsend engineered the sessions, with assistance from Jon Olliffe. On the first day, Street and the Promise Ring ran through separate lists of songs on which they wanted to work. Although "Become One Anything One Time" was at the bottom of the band's list, it was at the top of Street's; working on the song turned out to be enjoyable for them. During the sessions, the band wrote "Size of Your Life" and "Get on the Floor". The sessions lasted for six weeks, beginning in September 2001 and ending in early November. Additional recording was done for "Suffer Never", "Half Year Sun", "Letters to the Far Reaches" and "Feed the Night" at Polish Moon in Milwaukee, Wisconsin. The total cost for the sessions was between $100,000 and $200,000, 10 to 15 times the recording budgets of the Promise Ring's past releases. Street mixed the recordings at Jacobs, except for "Say Goodbye Good", which was mixed by Caldato at Sonora and MCJ Sound. Stephen Marcussen mastered the final recordings at Marcussen Mastering in Los Angeles.

== Composition and lyrics ==
Musically, Wood/Water has been described as an alternative country, indie rock, and pop album, with elements of roots rock, alternative pop, and psychedelic pop. The band moved away from their old emo sound, incorporating keyboards, percussion, pianos, acoustic guitars and soft vocals in the vein of Cat Stevens and Travis. Vermont's acoustic guitars and folk-based melodies are also present. Andrew Sacher of BrooklynVegan wrote that the band had "already started branching away from emo on 1999's power pop-infused Very Emergency, but Wood/Water drew a thick line in the sand between The Promise Ring and the E word". The album was described as reminiscent of the music by Wilco, Guided by Voices, Superchunk, the Flaming Lips, Wheat, and the Delgados. The title of Wood/Water comes from the opening line of "Become One Anything One Time". Gnewikow viewed the album as the "older cousin" of Nothing Feels Good, and said that recording in England was a positive influence: "The area that we were in was very lush and green and in some ways that's how I see the record, sort of warm and comfortable." Bohlen's vocals were compared to the Kinks frontman, Ray Davies, and lyrics on Wood/Water address the themes of change and re-evaluating one's life. Didier said that most of the lyrics are related to touring, especially the tours for Very Emergency; two songs from that album, namely, "Things Just Getting Good" and "All of My Everythings", pre-empted the direction they would explore on Wood/Water.

"Size of Your Life", the opening track, begins with guitar work that was compared to that in R.E.M.'s "What's the Frequency, Kenneth?" (1994), and features audio manipulation over Bohlen's vocals. The garage rock-pop song evokes "Tender" (1999) by Blur, and its abrupt keyboard ending recalls the sound Spiritualized. The song sets the lyrical tone for the rest of Wood/Water. During recording, Street told the Promise Ring to stand at the other end of the studio and interact with objects; Didier hit a fire extinguisher, Weber opened and closed a wooden chest, Bohlen banged two croquet mallets together, and Gnewikow played on an upside-down tennis-ball can. The resulting sound was the song's percussion track. "Stop Playing Guitar" is a power ballad that showcases Bohlen's storytelling ability, as he describes spending more time reading books than playing with the band. "Suffer Never", a primarily-acoustic song using synthesizers and distorted electric guitars, resembles their earlier material and the Flaming Lips' "Race for the Prize" (1999). "Become One Anything One Time", originally called "Wood/Water", features slide guitar; its "la la la" chorus is reminiscent of "Downhill" (1998) by Mysteries of Life.

"Wake Up April" opens with a drum machine and a keyboard as the Promise Ring shifts from a minor to a major scale. The song is reminiscent of 10cc's style, with Bohlen wondering what it would be like to drink his morning coffee in the afternoon. It has a percussion loop that the band had used as a click track; at Street's suggestion, they left it in the final version. The drum pattern and guitar riff of "Get on the Floor" recalls "Death of a Disco Dancer" (1987) by the Smiths, which Street also produced. According to Gnewikow, he was unaware of the comparison – despite listening to the Smiths' fourth studio album Strangeways, Here We Come (1987) at the time – until it was pointed out to him. "Half Year Sun" is an ambient country, song which borrows from the early work of Wilco. The folk rock track "My Life Is at Home" was compared to the Beach Boys and Weezer; it is followed by the Mercury Rev-inspired "Letters to the Far Reaches". The piano ballad "Bread and Coffee" is followed by "Say Goodbye Good", which features a phaser effect. With its choir section, the latter was compared to a Stereophonics rendition of the Beatles' "Hey Jude" (1968).

== Release and promotion ==
On December 17, 2001, Wood/Water was announced for release the following April. On February 9, 2002, the album's artwork was released: a photograph by Christopher Strong, referring to the greenery surrounding Jacobs Studio. "Get on the Floor" was posted online on March 3 of that year. The Promise Ring played a few shows around their appearance at the South by Southwest conference later in the month. During their performance, Bohlen passed out; he had additional surgery over the next few weeks in which a plate was implanted in his head. Wood/Water was made available for streaming on March 26, 2002 via a microsite before its April 23 release. The double 10" vinyl edition was released on Foreign Leisure Records, the band's own label. The version contains one bonus track, "All Good Souls", and has a slightly-different track listing. To promote the album, the Promise Ring delivered two acoustic in-store performances. They then headlined a US tour in April and May 2002, being supported by the Weakerthans and Certainly, Sir.

The music video for "Stop Playing Guitar" was posted online on May 3, 2002; filmed at a Los Angeles guitar factory, it was directed by former GusGus members Arni + Kinski. On May 24 of that year, the band performed on Late Night with Conan O'Brien, playing "Become One Anything One Time". They then supported Jimmy Eat World on their UK tour, where Wood/Water was released on May 27, 2002. "Stop Playing Guitar" was released as the album's lead single on July 9 of that year; the 7" vinyl version included an edit of "Stop Playing Guitar" alongside "You Only Tell Me You Love Me When You're Drunk", and the CD version featured an edit and album versions of "Stop Playing Guitar" and "All Good Souls". Jimmy Eat World were again supported by the Promise Ring for a handful of US dates in late July and early August 2002. In September and October, the band appeared as part of the 2002 Plea for Peace tour. Although the Promise Ring planned to film a video for "Suffer Never" after the tour, Epitaph and Anti- announced on October 14, 2002 that they had broken up. The band explained a week later that they had decided to focus on other projects, and had considered a breakup for a month or two. Additional plans, such as a two-to-three stint in mainland Europe and an early 2003 Japanese tour were also cancelled.

== Critical reception ==
Professional ratings
Aggregate scores
Source	Rating
Metacritic	69/100
Review scores
Source	Rating
AllMusic	3/5 stars
E! Online	B
The Encyclopedia of Popular Music	4/5 stars
Nude as the News	6.5/10
Pitchfork	3.2/10
Rolling Stone	3/5 stars

Wood/Water was met with generally positive reviews from music critics. At Metacritic, the album received an average score of 69, based on 12 reviews.

The A.V. Club writer Noel Murray said of the album that the "purposefully leaves aside youthful aggression in favor of probing, thoughtful musicality," and the "maturation process is like a bold rebuke to those who'd rather not grow up." Ox-Fanzine's Joachim Hiller wrote that the "latent punk-rock hardness has disappeared," being replaced by "soft, tender songs," which have "gained the upper hand." Stuart Green of Exclaim! wrote that the album is a "dark and sombre journey through the mind of the artist as a survivor" and "a testament to [Bohlen's] growth as a songwriter." PopMatters critic Adrien Begrand called Wood/Water "a great little album" and enjoyed hearing the Promise Ring "stretch out their sound." The staff of E! Online liked the album's change from "the fast track to the, um, slower track," and noted that the band's "jagged riffs and were aemotional intensity" are a "distant memory."

For the Milwaukee Journal Sentinel, Gemma Tarlach called the album a combination of "lyrical introspection and a ... lack of inhibition musically" that sees the Promise Ring "taking its creativity to a new and exciting level." Jon Caramanica of Rolling Stone found it "less blatantly melodic, peppy and cloying" than the Promise Ring's three earlier albums. LAS Magazine founder Eric J. Herboth wrote that the album's "structuring, layers, effects and ... mopey pace" make it sound more like Vermont than the Promise Ring; he said the album wasn't a "bad pop album, but it's totally impossible to digest as a Promise Ring album." According to AllMusic reviewer Kurt Morris, it "features hooks aplenty, vocal manipulations, and quite a few mellow numbers to boot." However, he opined that the album "starts out lukewarm" and has a "subdued feel, alienating die-hard fans and not doing anything daring enough to attract new ones." Pitchfork's Brent DiCrescenzo criticized the album for "miss[ing] the boat"; although he found the experimentation "admirable," DiCrescenzo explained that "you can't put a Sizzler sirloin on a gold plate and call it a filet."

On the album's legacy, Sacher said it "disappointed fans that wanted another Nothing Feels Good, and it didn't catch on with its intended audience either [...] but over the years, Wood/Water's profile has risen, and some (like Texas Is The Reason's Norman Brannon) consider it their best".

== Track listing ==
All songs written by the Promise Ring. All recordings produced by Stephen Street, except "Say Goodbye Good" produced by Mario Caldato Jr.

Wood/Water track listing
No.	Title	Length
1.	"Size of Your Life"	3:09
2.	"Stop Playing Guitar"	5:05
3.	"Suffer Never"	4:10
4.	"Become One Anything One Time"	4:19
5.	"Wake Up April"	5:07
6.	"Get on the Floor"	4:07
7.	"Half Year Sun"	5:40
8.	"My Life Is at Home"	4:16
9.	"Letters to the Far Reaches"	2:29
10.	"Bread and Coffee"	3:53
11.	"Say Goodbye Good"	6:37
12.	"Feed the Night"	3:04
Total length:		51:49

== Personnel ==
Personnel per booklet.

The Promise Ring

- Davey von Bohlen – vocals, guitar
- Jason Gnewikow – guitar, keyboards, percussion
- Dan Didier – drums, keyboards, percussion
- Ryan Weber – bass, guitar

Additional musicians

- Scott Schoenbeck – bass (track 11)
- Roger Joseph Manning Jr. – keyboards (track 11)
- Quincy McCrary – soloist (track 11)
- Wolfgang – additional strings (track 11)
- Joharl Funches Penny – choir (track 11)
- Larnakhosl Kuneno – choir (track 11)
- Shalott Hazzard – choir (track 11)

Production

- Stephen Street – producer (all tracks except 11), mixing (all tracks except 11), engineer
- Cenzo Townsend – engineer
- Jon Olliffe – assistant
- Mario Caldato Jr. – producer (track 11), mixing (track 11)
- Robert Carranza – recording (track 11)
- Kristian Riley – pre-production (tracks 2, 5, 8 and 11)
- Stephen Marcussen – mastering
- Jason Gnewikow – art direction, design
- Christopher Strong – photography

== See also ==
- The Invisible Band – the 2001 album by Travis, the sound of whom Wood/Water was compared to
