= The Horse Latitudes =

EP by The Promise Ring
- Released: February 11, 1997
- Recorded: April 1995, February–May, December 1996
- Genre: Emo
- Length: 24:09
- Label: Jade Tree

The Promise Ring chronology
30° Everywhere (1996)	The Horse Latitudes (1997)	Nothing Feels Good (1997)

Professional ratings
Review scores
Source	Rating
AllMusic	4/5 stars

The Horse Latitudes is an EP by American emo band The Promise Ring. It was released in 1997 on Jade Tree Records. The album was released between their debut album 30° Everywhere and their hit record Nothing Feels Good.

== Track listing ==
No.	Title	Length
1.	"Watertown Plank"	3:48
2.	"Mineral Point"	3:54
3.	"A Picture Postcard"	3:12
4.	"Saturday"	2:32
5.	"Scenes From Parisian Life"	1:26
6.	"E. Texas Ave"	2:32
7.	"Miette"	5:01
8.	"I Never Trusted the Russians"	2:01

- Tracks 1–2 originally released on the Watertown Plank 7"
- Tracks 3–5 originally released on the Falsetto Keeps Time 7"
- Track 6 originally on The Promise Ring/Texas is the Reason Split 7"
- Tracks 7–8 never before released

== Personnel ==
- Davey von Bohlen – vocals, guitar
- Jason Gnewikow – guitar
- Scott Beschta – bass guitar
- Dan Didier – drums
