= 30° Everywhere =

Studio album by the Promise Ring
- Released: September 10, 1996
- Recorded: June 1996
- Studio: Idful Music, Illinois
- Genre: Emo
- Length: 36:43
- Label: Jade Tree

The Promise Ring chronology
Falsetto Keeps Time (1996)	30° Everywhere (1996)	The Horse Latitudes (1997)

30° Everywhere is the debut studio album by American rock band the Promise Ring. It was released in 1996 on Jade Tree.

== Background ==
The Promise Ring were formed from the aftermath of several Midwest emo groups in February 1995: guitarists Jason Gnewikow and Matt Mangan (both formerly of None Left Standing), and drummer Dan Didier and bassist Scott Beschta (both formerly of Ceilishrine). Mangan moved to Indianapolis soon after the group formed, resulting in them inviting Cap'n Jazz guitarist Davey von Bohlen after he had moved to Milwaukee. He was friends with Gnewikow prior to this, but hadn't met Dider or Beschta before the group formed. The band recorded a three-track demo ("Jupiter", "12 Sweaters Red" and "Mineral Point") in early March, and played their first show shortly afterwards. In June, the group went on a 10-day East Coast tour; after a brief five-day rest, Bohlen went back on tour with Cap'n Jazz to support the release of their debut. After the ninth day of the tour, Cap'n Jazz broke up, and Bohlen was able to focus his time on the Promise Ring. Bohlen said being in Cap'n Jazz made it easier for the Promise Ring to book tours.

The band released a 7" vinyl single ("Watertown Plank" and "Mineral Point") through Foresight Records, which was owned by a friend of theirs. The band then went on tour, performing in church halls and basements across the US. While on tour, Texas Is the Reason guitarist Norman Brannon was given a copy of the band's demo and 7" single, and gave them to Jade Tree co-founder Tim Owen, who was his roommate. Jade Tree's other co-founder Darren Walters initially scoffed at the tape, thinking it was a joke; he later claimed that "[f]or some reason [...] it reminded me of U2." When the band were touring near Walters, he took them out to dinner and promptly signed them. After further touring at the start of 1996, the Falsetto Keeps Time EP was released in February, and was followed by a split single with Texas Is the Reason in May. Both releases were successful, with the band continuing to tour and work on material that would feature on their debut album.

== Production ==
According to Bohlen, the album was recorded in five days "in a situation where we had no idea what we wanted to do or how we wanted it to come out." Additionally, Bohlen was ill during the making of it, resulting in issues with his vocals. Zac Crainz of the Dallas Observer claimed the studio "apparently only had enough microphones to record the guitars." Didier later said in retrospect: "it was the wrong recording at the wrong time with the wrong person." Casey Rice had recently returned from touring around Europe with Tortoise, and to him, he felt that he was simply recording a punk rock act. Didier added: "So we were all like, 'This is our first record,' so it’s like 'Okay, cool, okay. Whatever. I love Tortoise!' We did that, and then listening back on the way home we were like, 'Fuck.'"

Musically, 30° Everywhere has been described as emo and avant-pop. "A Picture Postcard" details not wanting a partner's love to leave them.

== Release and reception ==
Professional ratings
Review scores
Source	Rating
AllMusic	4.5/5 stars
The Encyclopedia of Popular Music	4/5 stars

=== Promotion and touring ===
The Promise Ring had sold around 4,000 copies of 30° Everywhere on tour prior to its release on September 10, 1996. Despite this, the album was an underground success, earning the group attention from independent publications. The artwork consists of sepia-tinted double-exposed images, as well as a picture of the band members sitting on a couch. The attention was aided by the inclusion of the emo staple "A Picture Postcard", which had been released earlier on the Falsetto Keeps Time EP. The band had 500–600 copies of the album to sell over the course of several gigs, however, during one show at CBGB's, they sold all copies in one go. After breaking for the Christmas period, the band went on a six-week US tour with Texas Is the Reason. In April and May 1997, the group embarked on a European tour. 30° Everywhere was released in Japan in October 1999 through Cutting Edge. The album was re-pressed on vinyl alongside Nothing Feels Good (1997) and Very Emergency (1999) in late 2015.

=== Critical response and legacy ===
AllMusic reviewer Blake Butler said the band "certainly know how to write sharp, powerful, and beautiful songs." Adding that the album was "very catchy, very intense, [and] very powerful." Author Andy Greenwald in his book Nothing Feels Good: Punk Rock, Teenagers, and Emo (2003) wrote that the album was "rough but winning; the only hurdle for prospective listeners is von Bohlen's often off-key warbling".

30° Everywhere sold 12,000 copies by September 1997. It has been cited as one of the popular emo releases from the era, serving as both a benchmark and a blueprint for it. LA Weekly included the album on their list of the top 20 best emo albums. Bohlen dismissed the album in a 1999 interview with Alternative Press, saying he would "never listen to our first record. If we could have put out [Very Emergency] for our first record, we would have". Gnewikow did not think it was a "very good record", explaining that they had been a band for that long prior to its creation, "we had no business making an album like that then".

Man Overboard included a cover of "Red Paint" on their compilation The Human Highlight Reel (2011).

== Track listing ==
No.	Title	Length
1.	"Everywhere in Denver"	2:40
2.	"Red Paint"	2:54
3.	"Heart of a Broken Story"	2:44
4.	"Scenes from France"	2:32
5.	"Anne You Will Sing"	2:39
6.	"My Firetower Flame"	3:19
7.	"Between Pacific Coasts"	1:51
8.	"A Picture Postcard"	3:10
9.	"Somebody's Done For"	4:14
10.	"The Sea of Cortez"	5:03
11.	"Run Down the Waterfall"	3:08
12.	"We Don't Like Romance"	2:29

== Personnel ==
- Davey von Bohlen – vocals, guitar
- Jason Gnewikow – guitar
- Scott Beschta – bass guitar
- Dan Didier – drums
- Rachel Dietkus – violin on tracks 9 & 12
- Casey Rice - engineer
- Tim Owen & Scott Beschta – photography
