= Is This Thing On? (disambiguation) =

Is This Thing On? is a 2025 film by Bradley Cooper.

It may also refer to:

- "Is This Thing On?" (Pink song)
- "Is This Thing On?" (Promise Ring song)
