= Human Hearts =

Human Hearts may refer to:

- Human Hearts (original title Logan's Luck), an 1895 play by Hal Reid
- Human Hearts, a 1912 film directed by Otis Turner
- Human Hearts, 1914 film starring King Baggot
- Human Hearts (film), a 1922 film directed by King Baggot
- Human Hearts (album), the band Maritime's 2011 album
