= Get on the Floor =

Get on the Floor may refer to:

- "Get on the Floor", a song by Michael Jackson from his 1979 album Off the Wall
- "Get on the Floor", a song by The Promise Ring from their 2002 album wood/water
- "Get on the Floor", a song by Pitbull from his 2004 album M.I.A.M.I.
