= Maritime (band) =

American indie pop band

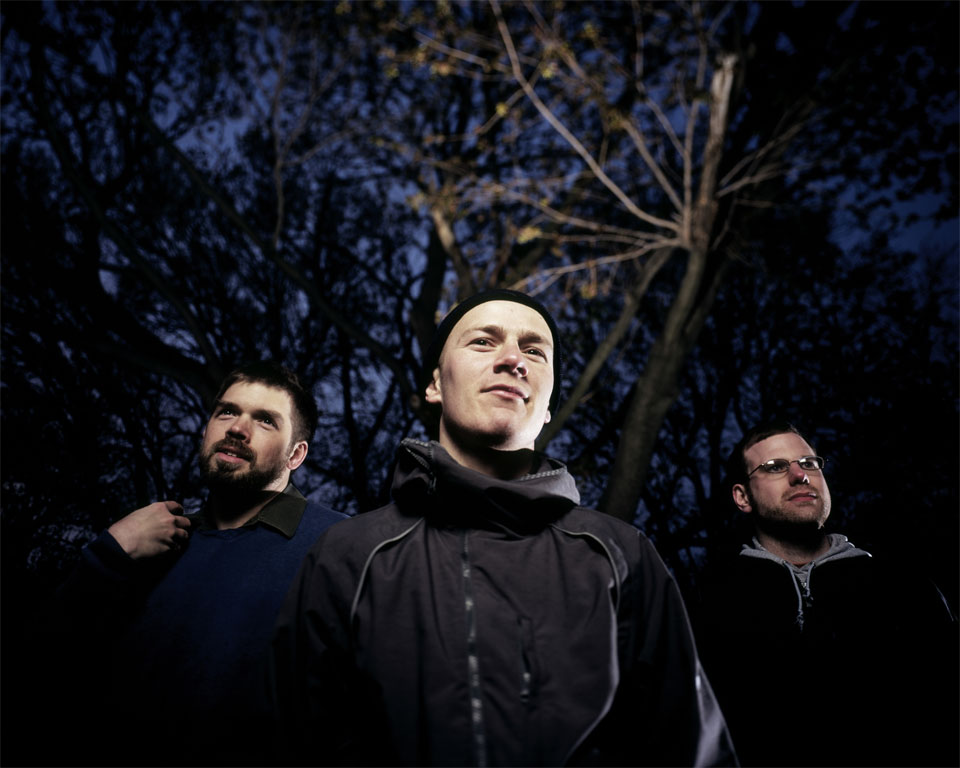

Background information
- Origin: Milwaukee, Wisconsin, United States
- Genres: Indie pop; indie rock; acoustic rock (early albums)
- Years active: 2003–2017 (on hiatus)
- Labels: Dangerbird; Foreign Leisure; DeSoto; Flameshovel; Grand Hotel van Cleef
- Spinoff of: The Promise Ring
- Members: Dan Didier; Davey von Bohlen; Justin Klug; Dan Hinz
- Past members: Eric Axelson

Maritime was an American indie pop band formed in 2003 after the breakup of The Promise Ring and The Dismemberment Plan.

== Career ==
The Promise Ring released their fourth studio album Wood/Water in April 2002; by October of that year, the band had broken up. Davey von Bohlen and Dan Didier of the Promise Ring started a band called In English. The pair came up with an album's worth of tracks that they subsequently demoed. They received interest from the Promise Ring's previous label Anti-; Bohlen said they made a deal over the phone where Anti would pay for the two to record an album. By June 2003, Eric Axelson of the Dismemberment Plan, who had broken up around the time that the Promise Ring did, had joined In English, which would rename themselves to Maritime. Bohlen had met Axelson at a Dismemberment Plan gig several years prior before either that band or the Promise Ring had released an album.

Sessions for their debut album were held at Phase in College Park, Maryland, Inner Ear in Arlington, Virginia, and Polish Moon in Milwaukee, Wisconsin with J. Robbins. After delivering the masters to Anti-, the company decided it did not want the album and returned it to them. Bohlen had shopped it to other labels, which turned him down, until he came across Kim Coletta of DeSoto Records. The label had previously released material from the Dismemberment Plan, while Bohlen was aware of Coletta from their work with Jawbox, which he was a fan of. The band went on tour and self-released an EP called Adios on their own label, Foreign Leisure. In October 2003, the band supported the Weakerthans on their headlining US tour. On May 31, 2004, the band released its debut studio album, Glass Floor on DeSoto Records.

On February 6, 2006, Axelson announced that he would leave the band. He was replaced on bass guitar by Justin Klug. Their second album, We, the Vehicles, was released on April 18, 2006, on Flameshovel Records to wide critical acclaim.

Their third album, Heresy and the Hotel Choir, was released on October 16, 2007, also on Flameshovel Records in the US and was released on Grand Hotel van Cleef in Germany on October 12, 2007, who also released Maritime's other two albums in Europe. "Guns of Navarone" was the first single from the new album.

In late April, 2010, the band announced that they were leaving Flameshovel Records and had signed with Dangerbird Records. Their fourth album Human Hearts was released on April 5, 2011.

On July 16, 2015, the band announced the release of Magnetic Bodies/Maps of Bones coming on October 16, 2015, on Dangerbird Records. They also launched a new song "Satellite Love" with a music video compiled of live recording footage.

In an August 2022 episode of the Talkhouse podcast, von Bohlen spoke with Jimmy Eat World vocalist Jim Adkins about their dueling careers and legacies. When the discussion turned to Maritime and von Bohlen referred to the group in the past tense, he quickly corrected himself and clarified that the band was "technically still together" and that there was "another album in them". No new material has been released since the podcast aired, but fans around the world are eagerly awaiting their possible return.

== Members ==
Current members

- Dan Didier – drums (2003–present)
- Davey von Bohlen – vocals/guitar (2003–present)
- Justin Klug – bass (2006–present)
- Dan Hinz – guitar (2006–present)

Former members

- Eric Axelson – bass guitar (2003–2006)

== Discography ==
- Adios EP (2003)
- Glass Floor (2004)
- We, the Vehicles (2006)
- Heresy and the Hotel Choir (2007)
- Human Hearts (2011)
- Magnetic Bodies/Maps of Bones (2015)
