= Nothing Feels Good: Punk Rock, Teenagers, and Emo =

Book by Andy Greenwald

- Author: Andy Greenwald
- Language: English
- Subject: Emo, punk rock
- Genre: Biography, music
- Publisher: St. Martin's Press
- Publication date: 15 November 2003
- Publication place: United States
- Media type: Print
- Pages: 320
- ISBN: 0-312-30863-9
- OCLC: 861608948

Nothing Feels Good: Punk Rock, Teenagers and Emo is a book by Andy Greenwald, then a senior contributing writer at Spin magazine, published in November 2003 by St. Martin's Press. Greenwald documents the history of the emo genre from its mid 1980s origins in Washington, D.C. to a more recent crop of bands, such as Thursday and Dashboard Confessional. The book received generally favorable reviews from music publications, with it appearing on best-of lists by Alternative Press and NME.

== Content and publication ==
In Nothing Feels Good: Punk Rock, Teenagers and Emo, Greenwald recounts the origin point of emo, starting with the hardcore punk scene in Washington, D.C. He pinpoints the origin of the genre's name to 1985, when it was originally referred to as "emotional hardcore or emocore". It leads into the 1990s underground reinvention of the genre with acts such as Jawbreaker and Sunny Day Real Estate. During this era, Greenwald considers Nothing Feels Good (1997) by the Promise Ring to be the embodiment of emo, which is where the book takes its name from. Chicago Reader writer Bob Mehr said the book's "narrative takes a pivotal turn" with the popularization of the Internet, as Greenwald explains how it aided the genre.

The book then continues into the current day of the genre, chronicling the rise of bands like the Get Up Kids and Thursday. The book heavily leans towards a fan perspective, discussed through interviews, emails and chatroom transcripts. A significant portion of it is dedicated to Chris Carrabba and his acoustic project Dashboard Confessional. Greenwald also details the history of blogging platform LiveJournal, dating site Makeoutclub, and the browser game Emogame. Jon Ross of PopMatters said the author "debunked some myths" surrounding the genre, such as "bands weren’t laced with frontmen who wept through their words and made screaming sound like whining". It was published by St. Martin's Press on November 15, 2003.

== Reception ==
Noel Murray of The A.V. Club felt Greenwald offers a "valuable primer, albeit an incomplete one", mentioning a lack of detail on Bright Eyes, Cursive and the artsy works of Death Cab for Cutie and the Dismemberment Plan. Murray wished that Greenwald had included a core catalogue of emo releases; despite this, he found it to be "extraordinarily handy as a report on what the scene is all about". Mehr praised Greenwald for doing a "solid job explaining the contributions" of bands like Jawbreaker and Sunny Day Real Estate, "but reduces other influential 90s outfits, like Boys Life and Christie Front Drive, to footnotes." While reviewing Everybody Hurts: An Essential Guide to Emo Culture (2007), Ross said it was an "excellent exploration of emo as a culture: where it came from, what it means, why it matters", adding that Greenwald "took the word ’emo’, gave it a face, and explained why it was popular".

Nick Catucci of The Village Voice wrote that the book would "engross young fans and the culturally curious with its blend of filthy gossip, detailed research, sturdy analysis, and—most important—empathy". The Spokesman-Review writer John Kappes said the book "makes a case that there is an undeniable grass-roots phenomenon here that could bear further investigation", while Dallas Observer contributor Andrea Grimes called it the "definitive work on [emo] music thus far". Spin's Adrienne Day said Greenwald "pins down the misunderstood genre and its teary-eyed, dedicated listeners", coming across as an "enthusiastic and exhaustive journalistic account of the music’s history". Eric Grubbs, author of Post: A Look at the Influence of Post-Hardcore 1985–2007 (2008), said Greenwald's approach, "which is 'Aww, these poor little guys, they've been mortally wounded by girls,' [...] I get the feeling that they've got their tongues in their cheeks when they're writing it." Writer Leor Galil equally disliked Greenwald as he "doesn’t seem to understand the impulse that emo acts have towards evolution, probably because the very thesis of Nothing Feels Good denies this concept". Blender's Dorian Lynskey wrote that, aside from interviews with Carrabba and Rivers Cuomo of Weezer, "there's precious little starpower here", and that some of the important people "don't have much in the way of insight".

NME's Madeleine Macrae considered Nothing Feels Good as one of the 20 best books on music, calling it a "serious, respectful analysis of emo culture". Alternative Press writer Alex Darus included the book on a list of 11 books about the scene, stating that it "makes the argument that emo is much more than a genre that is mocked by many, but it’s a huge part of being a teenager". Jameson Ketchum of New Noise Magazine said the book made Greenwald become "THEE foremost authority on the early 2000’s emo scene", as it serves as "an absolute must for any music fan even brushing past that era of greatness".
