= Vermont (band) =

Rock band from Milwaukee

- Origin: Milwaukee, WI, United States
- Genres: Indie rock
- Years active: 1999–2002
- Labels: Kindercore
- Members: Davey von Bohlen (guitar, vocals); Dan Didier (drums); Chris Roseanau (guitar)

Vermont was a Milwaukee, Wisconsin-based indie rock band and collaboration between Davey von Bohlen and Dan Didier of The Promise Ring and Chris Roseanau of Pele. The band released two albums on Kindercore Records and broke up in 2001, before von Bohlen founding the band Maritime. The album, "Calling Albany," was remastered, and re-released on vinyl in 2023 by Castle Danger Records. The release included a previously never-before-heard track ("She Says"), and was the first time the album was ever released on vinyl.

== Discography ==
- Living Together (1999 - Kindercore)
- Mark Mallman and Vermont (2001 - Guilt Ridden Pop)
- Calling Albany (2002 - Kindercore), (2023 - Castle Danger Records)
