= Makeoutclub.com =

Social networking service (1999–2017)

- Website type: Social networking service
- Creator: Gibby Miller
- Revenue: Advertisement
- Website: http://www.makeoutclub.com
- Registration: Optional
- Launched: Beta: 08/01/1999 | Launch: 06/19/2000
- Current status: Defunct

Makeoutclub.com was an early social networking website, the first that catered to youth and indie music culture. Launched in 1999 by Gibby Miller, Makeoutclub.com introduced features and concepts (such as customizable user profiles with photos and interests sections) that later became standard in social networking sites.

== About ==
The MVP/beta version of the site was launched in August 1999. This version of the site was hosted privately, the URL given to friends to "leak" for testing purposes before launch.

In the beginning, the site was simple, and featured member pages divided by "Boys" and "Girls" with each user able to maintain a "Profile Card", stream on a cams page, interact on site forums, and contribute news to the homepage. News on the site was typically music-oriented, or focused on youth culture, fashion, and internet gossip. Because member pages were rendered chronologically, users took pride in having an "early page number".

Makeoutclub.com was intended as a platform to bridge the distance between like-minded individuals in the music and youth subculture scenes when the internet was populated with early adopters. The site said it was "for indierockers, hardcore kids, record collectors, artists, bloggers, and hopeless romantics."

Makeoutclub.com was among the first social networking sites whose members experienced the stigma associated with meeting others online.

Makeoutclub.com grew to add fully featured user profile pages, image galleries, message boards, blogs, private mail, private galleries, and "crush-lists" (an early matchmaking feature). Despite its name, Miller insisted during the site's infancy that it was not a dating site, but a place to make friends. This assertion has been challenged many times.

Makeoutclub.com was featured in Time, The Face, Spin, Rolling Stone, and several television spots on MTV2, G4, Much Music, and more. It was the focal point and inspiration of Andy Greenwald's book about youth and the emo movement Nothing Feels Good: Punk Rock, Teenagers, and Emo as well as Leila Sales's book This Song Will Save Your Life.

The site was named after the song "Make Out Club" by the band Unrest.

Since its inception, Makeoutclub was linked to the hipster, emo, and indie subcultures.

== History ==
- (1999) Beta: Beta access was invite-only during testing in the months ahead of launch.
- (2000) 1.0: Version 1.0 was the "release" version of MOC.
- (2001) 2.0: Version 2.0 was a bug-fixing and security upgrade, which offered additional features like HTML on profiles and colored usernames.
- (2004) 3.0: Version 3.0 added a new design, additional bug fixes, and security upgrades.
- (2007) 4.0: Version 4.0 was an entirely new platform, and offered users their own individual profile pages with comments, blogs, and the ability to add and display friends. Users could now add multiple images to a gallery, send private messages to one another, and block other users. This version also introduced multiple forums.
- (2008) 5.0: Version 5.0 improved upon 4.0 adding private galleries, the ability to "wink" other users, post "shoutouts", create "crush lists" (secret friends lists that reveal the crush connection if two users "crush one another), and search for users in your area (along with user vicinity recommendation).
- (2012) 6.0: Version 6.0 went live the evening of April 19, 2012, bringing back required applications for approval (like the original platform did), and became entirely private, requiring a login to read the forums or to browse profiles.
- (2014) 7.0: Version 7.0 went live on February 22, 2014, with a responsive design and feature set, once again making the site publicly accessible, and restoring archives of old posts and site history as far back as 2002.
- (2017) Closure: Makeoutclub.com ceased operations on January 1, 2017.
