= Very Emergency =

Studio album by the Promise Ring
- Released: September 28, 1999
- Recorded: April 1999
- Studios: Inner Ear, Washington, D.C.
- Genres: Power pop; pop rock
- Length: 35:06
- Label: Jade Tree
- Producers: J. Robbins, the Promise Ring

The Promise Ring chronology
Nothing Feels Good (1997)	Very Emergency (1999)	Wood/Water (2002)

Very Emergency is the third studio album by American rock band the Promise Ring, released on September 28, 1999, through the label Jade Tree. Following the release of their second studio album Nothing Feels Good (1997), bassist Scott Beschta was replaced by Tim Burton. After a van accident, which resulted in a six-week break, Burton was replaced by Scott Schoenbeck. The band recorded their next album at Inner Ear Studios in Washington, D.C., co-producing it with J. Robbins. Very Emergency is a power pop and pop rock album that moves away from the emo style of their earlier works. It continued the sound of the Boys + Girls (1998) EP, and was compared to the work of the Lemonheads, the Pixies, Soul Asylum and the Wedding Present.

Very Emergency received generally favorable reviews from music critics, many of whom praised the band's change of sound, though some felt it was inferior to Nothing Feels Good. The band promoted it with a tour of the United States East Coast and Canada with Euphone. They ended the year with a two-month US tour with Robbins' band Burning Airlines. In early 2000, the Promise Ring played in Japan, and went on another US tour. Though they had planned to go to Europe, the trek was cancelled when it was discovered that frontman Davey von Bohlen had meningioma. After surgery and a few months break, the band supported Bad Religion on their US tour. Spin ranked the album within their list of the top 20 best releases from 1999.

== Background and production ==
The Promise Ring released their second album Nothing Feels Good in October 1997. It received critical praise, and was featured on best-of album lists for the year by the likes of The New York Times and Teen People. In addition, it pushed the band to the forefront of the emo music scene; they became the most successful emo act of the era with sales of Nothing Feels Good reaching the mid-five figures. The album received airplay on college radio, and the music video for "Why Did Ever We Meet" appeared on MTV's 120 Minutes. Bassist Scott Beschta was replaced on the album's supporting tour by Tim Burton, who had played with Gnewikow in his former band None Left Standing.

In February 1998, the band were traveling back home from a show in the midst of a snowstorm. After Bohlen hit a bump on the road, their van flipped over. Bohlen, Burton and Didier were released from hospital the following morning while Gnewikow was in the intensive care unit for three weeks for a broken collarbone and other injuries. They returned to touring after a six-week break, though with Gnewikow suffering intermittent pain from his collarbone due to his guitar strap. Since the group felt Burton was not working out, coupled with his broken arm, they replaced him with Scott Schoenbeck. At the time, Schoenbeck had formed Pele with Beschta. Bohlen had head trauma and subsequently suffered form constant headaches following the crash. In October 1998, the band released the Boys + Girls EP; around this time, they had several new songs that were finished and were anticipating recording their next album in early 1999.

In March 1999, the band aired new material during a few shows, leading up to their European tour in the next month. Following the stint, the group began recording their next album at Inner Ear Studios in Washington, D.C. The band stayed at the residence of Burning Airlines member J. Robbins in Silver Spring, Maryland and would drive to the studio each day. Ahead of the sessions, Didier had sent Robbins a tape of songs with drum tones that he liked, which included the work of the Pixies. Producer credit was split between Robbins and the band. Throughout the sessions, Bohlen theorised he was taking a bottle of headache pills every couple of days as he was suffering from migraine headaches. Robbins, Jenny Toomey and Smart Went Crazy member Hilary Soldati appeared on the album. The recordings were mixed at Smart Studios, before they were mastered by Alan Douches at West West Side Music.

== Composition ==
Musically, the sound of Very Emergency has been described as power pop and pop rock. Though it has also been tagged as emo, it has been noted that the album moves away from this style. It continued the pop-orientated direction the band alluded to on the Boys + Girls EP, drawing comparison to the Wedding Present, the Pixies, Soul Asylum and the Lemonheads. Unlike Nothing Feels Good which saw the band work on songs from jamming; for Very Emergency, a number of tracks saw Bohlen come up with a barebones rhythm guitar part and vocal melody, which the band would add to and structure around.

The opening track "Happiness Is All the Rage" is a pop song that segues into "Emergency! Emergency!", which was compared to the pop punk scene in Berkeley, California. It features a guitar riff that was reminiscent of the one heard in "Just What I Needed" by the Cars. The rock track "Happy Hour" is followed by the ballad "Things Just Getting Good", which sees each member of the band being namechecked and features a reference to "Take Manhattan" (2001) by the Big Bright Lights. "Living Around" was compared to the work of Fountains of Wayne. "Jersey Shore" conveys the feelings of a summer ending, and is followed by the Cars-indebted "Skips a Beat (Over You)", which features backing vocals from Toomey. The latter describes a person wanting to relive particular events so that they can handle their emotions better. "Arms and Danger" includes a reference to Schoenbeck's birth year. The album's closing track, "All of My Everythings", is a slower song that, along with "Things Just Getting Good", pre-empt the direction the band would go on their next studio album, Wood/Water (2002).

== Release ==
Very Emergency was released on September 28, 1999, through Jade Tree. The album's artwork features former Joan of Arc member Paul Koob as a chauffeur. Since the band had previously seen him with a moustache, they asked him to grow one purposely for the cover of the album. Didier said the inspiration for the design came from the film Rushmore (1998), which guitarist Jason Gnewikow loved and wanted each member of the band to dress up as different characters. The characters were based on each person's personalities, such as Bohlen being into sports, Didier acted as an architect, Gnewikow served as a hopeless romantic, Schoenbeck as a businessman, and Joan of Arc frontman Tim Kinsella dressing up as a priest. It came out on the same day as the Get Up Kids' Something to Write Home About; the profile of the Get Up Kids and the Promise Ring were rising while their other contemporaries, such as Braid and Christie Front Drive, had broken up. Around this time, they went on a tour of the US and Canada to promote the album with Euphone.

A music video was made for "Emergency! Emergency!", directed by Darren Doane, and stars the roommate of Didier's girlfriend, in addition to Dave Kaminski and Schoenbeck's brother Mike, who served as their touring manager. It also features Josh Modell as a milkman in reference to the magazine he was publishing at the time, Milk. Didier and his brother worked on the script and then sent it to Doane. The video, shot in Didier's place and his girlfriend's place in Milwaukee, was made solely as Doane said he would do it for free; the clip premiered on 120 Minutes in October. In October and November, the band embarked on a two-month trek of the US with Burning Airlines, Pele and the Dismemberment Plan, among others. Further shows were added with Burning Airlines, pushing the trek into early December. The band performed in Japan in February 2000, before taking a break. They went on a US east coast and midwest tour the following month with Rich Creamy Paint, the Explosion and Pele.

In May and June, the band were scheduled to go on a European tour with Burning Airlines, however, on the day they were due to go, Bohlen was diagnosed with meningioma, a brain tumor variant. The tour was immediately cancelled and Bohlen underwent surgery on May 8, which saw his skull being removed and reattached. Up to this point, he had been suffering from strong headaches whenever the band performed for a year and a half. Two outtakes from the Very Emergency sessions were included on the Electric Pink EP, released in mid-May. The band took the next few months off to recuperate. In September, the band began supporting Bad Religion for three weeks on their US tour. While in Atlanta, Georgia, Bohlen woke up in a pool of blood on his pillow. He had to receive another operation that would remove the infected portion of his skull. As a result, the band dropped off the tour. They played shows in February 2001 to make up for the cancelled shows they had planned for December. The album was re-pressed on vinyl alongside 30° Everywhere (1996) and Nothing Feels Good in late 2015.

== Reception ==
Professional ratings
Review scores
Source	Rating
AllMusic	3/5 stars
Robert Christgau	(1-star Honorable Mention)
The Encyclopedia of Popular Music	3/5 stars
Entertainment Weekly	B
NME	3/5 stars
Pitchfork	8.2/10
PopMatters	9.6/10

Very Emergency was met with generally favorable reviews from music critics. AllMusic reviewer Blake Butler wrote that the band's "emotionally tense and sentimental edge has pretty much entirely disappeared; everything is happy, bouncy, and catchy as hell, which isn't always a bad thing". He added that the "lyrics have lost that classic Promise Ring feel -- they actually make clear sense a lot of the time. At times, the music just gets so poppy that it is sickening". Tad Hendrickson of CMJ New Music Report found the album to be "brimming with ringing hooks and a deepening sense of thoughtful pop craft". He added that the band "embellishes these tunes with an assured but bittersweet maturity that reaches well beyond pop's often mundane sentiments". Brian M. Raftery of Entertainment Weekly wrote that while the band had "solidified their indie following with pressurized melodic musings, their third album reveals a knack for hook-heavy power pop".

MTV writer Steven Kandell felt that in an "alternative (read: better) universe, commercial radio would be crawling with gems like the ones that make up" the album. He added that it was "more crafted and polished" than its predecessor. Joachim Hiller of Ox-Fanzine wrote that after a few listens, the band's music had "stuck in your ears and brain, every song is a little hit". Sonicnet's Jason Ferguson said the "super infectious hooks [...] collide with rock-solid riffage [...] to create a very powerful brew". Punk Planet writer Ryan Batke considered it an improvement over their previous album; halfway through his initial listen of it, the "melody had carved out a permanent home for itself in my brain". The staff at NME wrote that the band have "gone one step further than the wracked melodicism" of their previous album "and made a pop record" with a "bristling catchiness that’s propelling them to the fore of US college circles".

Nick Mirov of Pitchfork wrote that the band's "newfound commitment to conventional pop song structures and chord progressions appears to displace energy levels to detrimental effect". He noted that "Chorus integrity has increased significantly, but melodic development in verse lags behind". He said the lyrical "quotient [is] slightly higher than before, but given new reliance on conventional structures, still below average". PopMatters contributor Justin Stranzl wrote that "by making a simpler record than its predecessor was, the Promise Ring have succeeded where so many bands have failed". He added that the "lyrical content never turns negative [...] and the tempo never slows" as the "intentional simplicity charms and energizes like nothing the band has ever done". Critic Robert Christgau gave it a star and wrote: "Finding the tuneful poetry in a moment when most punks are well-meaning dorks going through a phase". The A.V. Club writer Stephen Thompson said it was a "far cry from its more intense predecessor [...] Which is fine: The Promise Ring certainly isn't contractually obligated to make the same great record over and over". He commended the band's "approach to big, catchy pop" for being "admirable. The problem is more with spotty execution than faulty goals". The staff at SF Weekly wrote that instead of "crossing over, the Promise Ring is content to hold court over a pop subculture — a subculture that's becoming an exact replica of the über-culture's insipid archetypes".

Spin included the album on their top 20 best albums of 1999 list.

== Track listing ==
All songs written by Davey von Bohlen, Jason Gnewikow, Scott Schoenbeck, and Dan Didier.

No.	Title	Length
1.	"Happiness Is All the Rage"	2:55
2.	"Emergency! Emergency!"	2:56
3.	"The Deep South"	3:42
4.	"Happy Hour"	3:05
5.	"Things Just Getting Good"	4:45
6.	"Living Around"	4:05
7.	"Jersey Shore"	2:39
8.	"Skips a Beat (Over You)"	2:01
9.	"Arms and Danger"	3:23
10.	"All of My Everythings"	5:35

== Personnel ==
Personnel per booklet.

The Promise Ring

- Davey von Bohlen – vocals, guitar
- Jason Gnewikow – guitar
- Scott Schoenbeck – bass
- Dan Didier – drums

Additional musicians

- J. Robbins – additional performance
- Jenny Toomey – additional performance
- Hilary Soldati – additional performance

Production

- J. Robbins – producer
- The Promise Ring – producer
- Alan Douches – mastering
- Andy Mueller – photography
- Jason Gnewikow – art direction, design
