= Four Walls Falling =

- Origin: Richmond, Virginia, United States
- Genres: Hardcore punk
- Years active: 1987–1995
- Labels: Jade Tree Records

Four Walls Falling was an American hardcore punk band from Richmond, Virginia, active between 1987 and 1995. Their most successful release was Culture Shock in 1991.

== Band members ==
=== Original lineup ===
- Greta Brinkman (Unseen Force and later Moby, L7, Debbie Harry Band)
- Dewey Rowell (Unseen Force & White Cross, later Gwar)
- Bo Steele (Pledge Allegiance)
- Taylor Steele on vocals (Pledge Allegiance)
- Kyle Walker on drums Fed Up!
- Cliff Farrarr replaced Greta on bass
- Caine Rose replaced Cliff on bass Fed Up!
- Brett Wenleder replaced Dewey on guitar

=== Later members ===
- Matt Rankin
- William Thidemann
- John Papazoglou
- Grant Ross
- Kenny Wagner (died 2016)
- John Peters
- Jared Srsic
- Nick Pell
- Stitches
- Tommy Anthony
- Cam DiNunzio (touring guitarist, 1995)

== Discography ==
=== Albums ===
- Four Walls Falling 7" (1988, Axtion Packed Records)
- Culture Shock (1991, Jade Tree Records)
- Burn It (1992, Redemption Records)
- Punish The Machine 7" (1994, Understand Records)
- Food for Worms (LP 1994, Day After Records)

=== Compilation appearances ===
- Complete Death II (1988)
