= We, the Vehicles =

Studio album by Maritime
- Released: October 28, 2005
- Studio: Bionic, Polish Moon
- Genre: Indie pop
- Length: 36:17
- Label: Flameshovel
- Producer: Kristian Riley

Maritime chronology
Glass Floor (2004)	We, the Vehicles (2005)	Heresy and the Hotel Choir (2007)

We, the Vehicles is the second studio album by Maritime. It is the band's final album with the bass guitarist Eric Axelson.

== Background ==
We, the Vehicles was recorded at Bionic Studios and Polish Moon with Kristian Riley and the band acting as producers and engineers. Riley mixed the recordings, before they were mastered by Alan Douches at West West Side.

== Release ==
On February 10, 2006, bassist Eric Axelson left the band; he was replaced by Decibully member Justin Flug. They went on a two-week tour in March 2004, prior to the release of We, the Vehicles on April 4, 2006. It was subsequently made available for streaming through AOL Music two weeks later. In September 2006, the band went on a tour of the US. They closed out the year touring the US East Coast, and playing a hometown show on New Years Eve.

== Reception ==
Professional ratings
Aggregate scores
Source	Rating
Metacritic	80/100
Review scores
Source	Rating
AllMusic	3.5/5 stars
Alternative Press	5/5
The A.V. Club	A−
Cokemachineglow	82%
LAS Magazine	7/10
Ox-Fanzine	9/10
Pitchfork	7.8/10
PopMatters	7/10
Stylus Magazine	B+
Tiny Mix Tapes	3/5 stars

We, the Vehicles was met with generally favourable from music critics. At Metacritic, which assigns a normalized rating out of 100 to reviews from mainstream publications, the album received an average score of 80, based on 12 reviews.

Of the album, Brian Howe of Pitchfork said that it "not only exceeds its predecessor [Glass Floor], but serves as a corrective to every one of its deficiencies."

Punknews.org ranked the album at number six on their list of the year's 20 best releases.

== Track listing ==
Track listing per booklet. All recordings produced by Kristian Riley and Maritime.

1. "Calm" – 3:23
2. "Tearing Up the Oxygen" – 3:57
3. "People, the Vehicles" – 3:41
4. "Parade of Punk Rock T-Shirts" – 3:27
5. "We Don't Think, We Know" – 2:22
6. "No One Will Remember You Tonight" – 2:46
7. "Young Alumni" – 3:39
8. "Don't Say You Don't" – 3:34
9. "German Engineering" – 3:59
10. "Twins" – 2:21
11. "Protein and Poison" – 2:51
- Vinyl LP bonus tracks
1. "Before You Were Born" (Side A)
2. "Call Me Home" (Side B)

== Personnel ==
Personnel per booklet.

Musicians

- Eric Axelson
- Dan Didier
- Davey von Bohlen
- Dan Hinz
- Kristian Riley

Production and design

- Kristian Riley – producer, engineer, mixing
- Maritime – producer, engineer
- Alan Douches – mastering
- Andy Mueller – art direction, paintings, collages, design
- Chris Strong – band photography
