= Calling Albany =

Studio album by Vermont
- Released: January 22, 2002
- Genre: Indie rock
- Label: Kindercore

Vermont chronology
Mark Mallman and Vermont (2001)	Calling Albany (2002)

Professional ratings
Review scores
Source	Rating
AllMusic	3/5 stars
Pitchfork	2.7/10
Under the Radar	3/10

Calling Albany is the second and final studio album by Vermont. It was released on January 22, 2002, on Kindercore Records.

== Track listing ==
All tracks by Dan Didier, Chris Rosenau and Davey vonBohlen

1. "Bells of Saint Alcohol" – 2:46
2. "Chlorine Chlorine" – 2:53
3. "Ballad of Larry Bird" – 3:58
4. "*" – 5:41
5. "Where the Wild Drums Are" – 2:52
6. "Hello_Goodbye Sex" – 3:23
7. "Screw-on Shoes" – 3:21
8. "Kill an Hour" – 2:48
9. "Arrest Harrison Ford!" – 2:40
10. "The World Doesn't Ask You" – 3:39
11. "Commodores 64" – 1:30
12. "I'd Be Happy as the World Turning Around You" – 3:14

== Personnel ==
- Dan Didier – Drums, Engineer
- Justin Engel – Mastering
- Scott Kawczynski – Art Direction
- Chris Rosenau – Engineer
- Damian Strigens – Bass
- Davey vonBohlen – Guitar, Vocals, Engineer
