= Heresy and the Hotel Choir =

Studio album by Maritime
- Released: October 16, 2007
- Recorded: 2007
- Genre: Indie rock, indie pop
- Length: 41:39
- Label: Flameshovel
- Producer: Stuart Sikes

Maritime chronology
We, the Vehicles (2005)	Heresy and the Hotel Choir (2007)	Human Hearts (2011)

Professional ratings
Review scores
Source	Rating
Pitchfork	(7.1/10)
Alternative Press	4.5/5 stars
Spin	link

Heresy and the Hotel Choir is an album by indie pop band Maritime. It is the band's third full-length album and was released on October 16, 2007.

== Release ==
On September 10, 2007, Heresy and the Hotel Choir was announced for release the following month. They supported Jimmy Eat World on their headlining US tour until November 2007. Following this, they went on a US tour to close out the year. Heresy and the Hotel Choir was released on vinyl on October 2, 2007, ahead of the CD version on October 16, 2007. "Boy from School" was posted online in January 2008. A music video was released for "Guns of Navarone" on February 8, 2008.

== Track listing ==
1. "Guns of Navarone" – 3:02
2. "With Holes for Thumb Sized Birds" – 2:45
3. "For Science Fiction" – 3:10
4. "Hand Over Hannover" – 3:26
5. "Aren't We All Found Out" – 2:13
6. "Peril" – 2:48
7. "Pearl" – 5:23
8. "Hours That You Keep" – 2:56
9. "Be Unhappy" – 3:39
10. "Are We Renegade" – 1:41
11. "First Night on Earth" – 4:50
12. "Love Has Given Up" – 3:49

== Limited edition 7" ==
Heresy and the Hotel Choir was released on the band's own Foreign Leisure label on vinyl. Included with the LP is a 7", limited to 1000 copies in the first press.

1. Witches & Snowmen (Snailhouse cover)
2. Boy From School (Hot Chip cover)
