= Living Together (album) =

Studio album by Vermont
- Released: September 28, 1999
- Genre: Indie rock
- Label: Kindercore Records

Vermont chronology
Living Together (1999)	Mark Mallman and Vermont (2001)

Professional ratings
Review scores
Source	Rating
AllMusic	4/5 stars

Living Together is the debut studio album by Vermont. It was released on September 28, 1999 on Kindercore Records.

== Track listing ==
1. "Indiana Jones"
2. "Lightning Tattoos"
3. "Broadway Joe"
4. "Where Planes Go Down"
5. "Living Together"
6. "Bee, Leave Me Be"
7. "Tiny White Crosses"
8. "Downtown Heart"
9. "Old Blue"
10. "My Favorite Legend"
11. "These Dudes, They Got a Band"
