= The Promise Ring =

American rock band

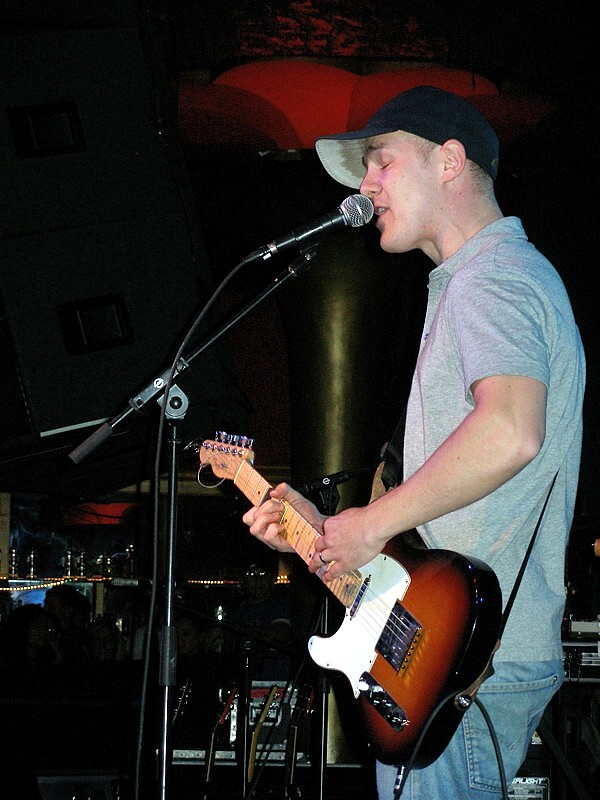
- Frontman Davey von Bohlen in 2007

Background information
- Origin: Milwaukee, Wisconsin, U.S.
- Genres: Emo; indie rock; power pop
- Works: Discography
- Years active: 1995–2002; 2011–2012 (one-off reunions: 2005, 2015, 2016)
- Labels: Jade Tree; Anti-; Dangerbird
- Spinoffs: Vermont; Maritime
- Spinoff of: Cap'n Jazz
- Members: Dan Didier; Jason Gnewikow; Davey von Bohlen; Scott Schoenbeck
- Past members: Matt Mangan; Scott Beschta; Tim Burton; Ryan Weber

The Promise Ring was an American rock band from Milwaukee, Wisconsin, that is recognized as part of the second wave of emo. Among various other EPs and singles, the band released four studio albums during their initial run: 30° Everywhere (1996), Nothing Feels Good (1997), Very Emergency (1999), and Wood/Water (2002). Their first two albums solidified their place among the emo scene; their third effort shifted toward pop music, while their final record was much more experimental in nature. The band initially broke up in 2002 and has reunited sporadically since then to perform live, but no new material from the band has since been released. They were last active for a live performance in 2016.

The Promise Ring was formed in 1995 by guitarist Jason Gnewikow and drummer Dan Didier. Cap'n Jazz guitarist Davey von Bohlen joined the band soon thereafter and became the band's vocalist. The trio remained the Promise Ring's core members throughout its history. The band has employed a host of other bass guitarists throughout its existence, but their last bassist Scott Schoenbeck has remained with the group the longest. The Promise Ring have had a significant impact on emo music, influencing numerous bands such as Dashboard Confessional, Basement, Title Fight, and Pet Symmetry.

== History ==
=== Formation (1995) ===
The Promise Ring was formed in Milwaukee, Wisconsin, from the aftermath of two groups in February 1995: guitarists Jason Gnewikow and Matt Mangan (both from None Left Standing), and drummer Dan Didier and bassist Scott Beschta (both from Ceilishrine). Mangan moved to Indianapolis soon after the group formed, prompting the band to invite Cap'n Jazz guitarist Davey von Bohlen as Mangan's replacement. Von Bohlen was friends with Gnewikow prior to this, but Didier and Beschta became new acquaintances to him after joining the group. The band recorded a three-track demo which included "Jupiter", "12 Sweaters Red" and "Mineral Point" that March, and played their first show shortly afterward. In June, the group went on a 10-day tour of the East Coast; von Bohlen soon returned to tour with Cap'n Jazz to support the release of their debut, Shmap'n Shmazz. After the ninth day of that tour, Cap'n Jazz broke up, and von Bohlen was able to focus his time on the Promise Ring.

=== Early releases and 30° Everywhere (1996–1997) ===
The Promise Ring released a 7-inch vinyl single through Foresight Records, which contained the tracks "Watertown Plank" and "Mineral Point". Foresight was owned by a friend of theirs. The band then went on tour, performing in church halls and basements across the US. Texas Is the Reason guitarist Norman Brannon acquired copies of the group's demo and 7-inch single and gave them to Jade Tree co-founder Tim Owen. Shortly afterwards, the band was signed to the independent label for a three-album contract. After further touring at the start of 1996, the Falsetto Keeps Time EP was released in February, and was followed by a split single with Texas Is the Reason in May. Both releases were successful, with the band continuing to tour and work on material that would feature on their debut album.

The Promise Ring's first studio album titled 30° Everywhere, was released by Jade Tree in September 1996. Retrospectively, band members have voiced their dislike of the record; according to von Bohlen, the album was recorded in only five days. The band additionally was confused about how they wanted to approach the music on the new record; von Bohlen described the situation as one "where we had no idea what we wanted to do or how we wanted it to come out." Didier later spoke of his dislike of Casey Rice's engineering on the record, as well as von Bohlen's illness during the recording: "it was the wrong recording at the wrong time with the wrong person."

Despite this, the release was an underground success, earning the group's attention from independent publications. The attention was drawn and aided by the inclusion of "A Picture Postcard", which had earlier appeared on Falsetto Keeps Time and would go on to become a staple of the emo genre. The song again appeared as part of an EP titled The Horse Latitudes, which effectively reissued the band's earlier work in early 1997. Although the band had 500–600 copies of 30° Everywhere to sell over the course of several gigs, the album sold out at CBGB's. The band further promoted 30° Everywhere starting with a six-week US tour with Texas Is the Reason, followed by a European tour in April–May 1997.

=== Nothing Feels Good (1997–1998) ===
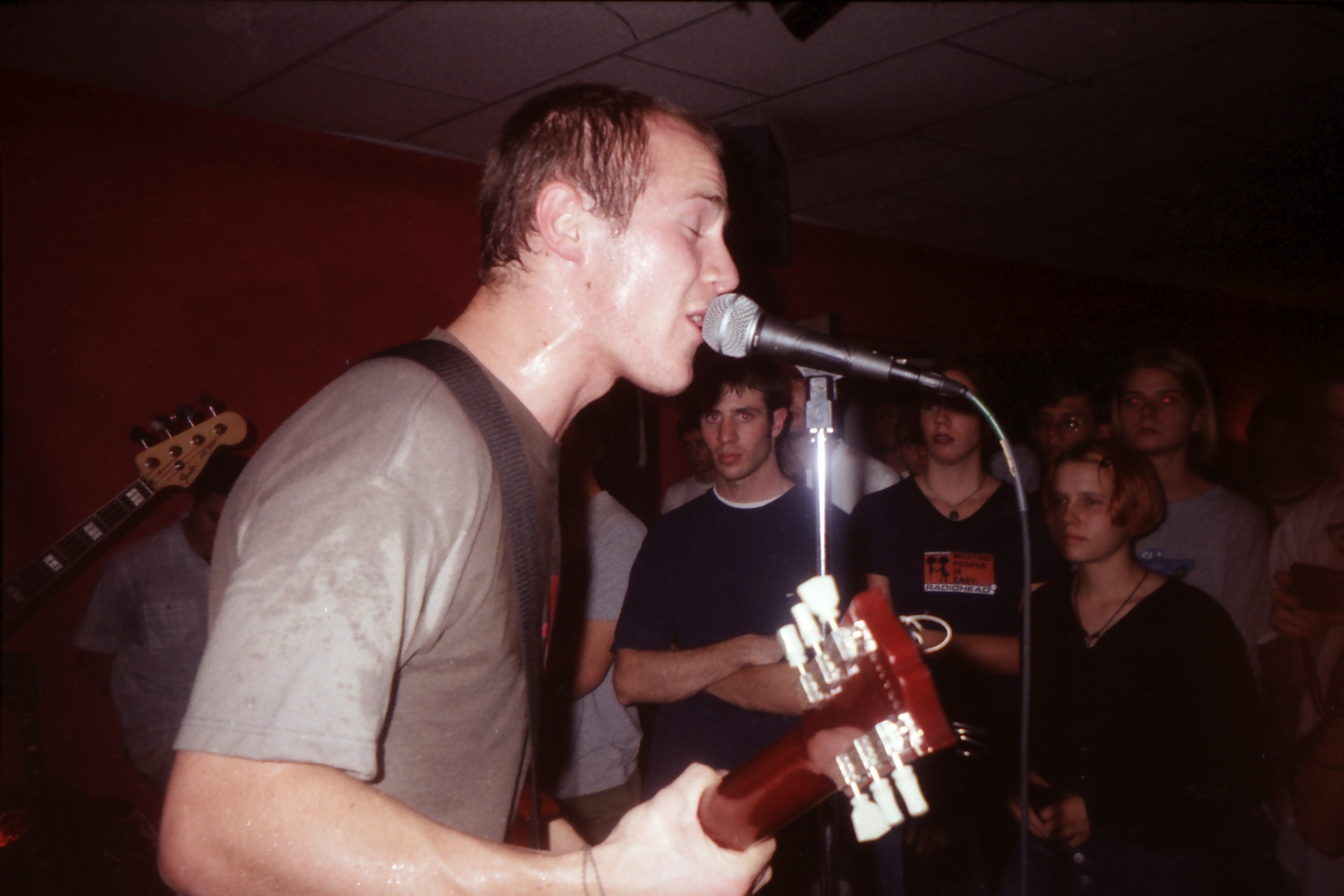
The Promise Ring performing in 1997

Immediately following the European tour's conclusion, the band began writing new material for their second album, sometimes jamming for inspiration. The group went to Memphis, Tennessee, and recorded the album, titled Nothing Feels Good, at Easley McCain Recording with producer J. Robbins of Jawbox. The relationship between Didier and Beschta throughout the sessions progressively deteriorated. Around the release of Nothing Feels Good, For the album's supporting tour, Beschta was replaced on bass by Tim Burton, a former bandmate of Gnewikow's in None Left Standing. A music video was made for the album's fourth track, "Why Did Ever We Meet"; it was directed by Darren Doane. Though the sessions were marked by turbulence, the album received excellent critical reception, and was featured on best-of album lists for the year by The New York Times and Teen People.

In February 1998, the band was traveling back home from a show while on tour with Hum during a snowstorm. While driving through Nebraska, their van flipped over after von Bohlen hit a bump on the road; von Bohlen flew head-first through the windshield. Von Bohlen (who had head trauma), Burton (who had broken bones), and Didier were released from the hospital the following morning. Gnewikow, however, was in the intensive care unit for three further weeks due to a broken collarbone and other injuries. Following the van accident, the band decided to replace their bassist once again, hiring Scott Schoenbeck in favor of Burton. The band took a six-week break to recover from the van accident before resuming shows with Jimmy Eat World in the East Coast of the US, and a European stint with Jets to Brazil. The band again toured with Jets to Brazil across the US in October and Japan in November.

=== Boys + Girls, Very Emergency and Electric Pink (1998–2001) ===
In October 1998, the band released the Boys + Girls EP, which contained the two tracks "Tell Everyone We're Dead" and "Best Looking Boys". In March 1999, the band performed new material during a few shows, leading up to their European tour that April. Following that stint, the group began recording their next album Very Emergency, at Inner Ear Studios in Washington, D.C. J. Robbins would return as the producer of the new album, but production credit was this time split between Robbins and the band. Robbins, Jenny Toomey and Smart Went Crazy member Hilary Soldati made guest appearances on the album. The recordings were mixed at Smart Studios, before they were mastered by Alan Douches at West Side Music.

Jade Tree released Very Emergency on September 28, 1999. Around the time of release, they went on a brief tour to promote the album on the East Coast and in Canada with Euphone. Doane returned to film the music video for "Emergency! Emergency!"; the band agreed to make the video because Doane volunteered to do it for free. It premiered on 120 Minutes in October. The band reconvened with Robbins to tour the US with his band, Burning Airlines, through October and November; they were joined by Pele and the Dismemberment Plan, among others. Further shows were added with Burning Airlines, pushing the trek into early December. The band performed in Japan in February 2000, before taking a break. They went on an American East Coast and Midwest tour the following month with Rich Creamy Paint, the Explosion and Pele.

In May and June, the band was scheduled to go on a European tour with Burning Airlines, however, on the day they were due to leave to begin the shows, von Bohlen was diagnosed with meningioma, a brain tumor variant. The tour was immediately cancelled and von Bohlen underwent surgery on May 8. Up to this point, he had been suffering from strong headaches whenever the band performed for a year and a half. Two outtakes from the Very Emergency sessions were included on the Electric Pink EP, released in mid-May. The band took the next few months off to recuperate. They began playing shows again in September, when the band supported Bad Religion for three weeks on their US tour; however, von Bohlen developed a post-operative infection during this stint that resulted in the group dropping off. They played shows in February 2001 to make up for the cancelled shows they had planned for December.

=== New record label, Wood/Water and disbandment (2001–2002) ===
After finishing the rescheduled tour dates in February, the Promise Ring went and worked on material with Kristian Riley of Citizen King. By March 2001, the band had parted ways with Jade Tree, as the label was unable to give the amount of financial support that the band was looking for. After being courted by Epitaph Records, the group signed with their imprint Anti- later that year. With Anti-, the group were also looking to move further away from emo, which the band had become increasingly known for while on Jade Tree. Von Bohlen would liken his band and the label to each other as stylistically synonymous. The group also experienced licensing conflicts with Jade Tree, resulting in difficulties distributing the Promise Ring's releases to labels in other countries, including European releases of Electric Pink and album releases in Japan.

Coinciding with an April and May 2001 tour with Camden, their frontman William Seidel was welcomed to the Promise Ring as their touring keyboardist. With Didier, von Bohlen, and Gnewikow being fans of the Smiths and Blur, the band chose Stephen Street to produce their fourth album, as he had produced for both of those groups. The band ran into budget issues after Street went on vacation and were unable to contact him, so they instead decided to split the recording between Street in the London and Mario Caldato Jr. in Los Angeles. "Say Goodbye Good" was produced by Caldato during this period, but the majority of the record ended up being produced by Street at Jacobs Studios in Farnham. Schoenbeck was unhappy with the stylistic change during the Los Angeles sessions and left before working with Street. He was replaced by Ryan Weber of Camden for the remainder of the album's recording.

The title, Wood/Water, was announced in December 2001; it would be released on April 23, 2002. It was preceded by an online release of "Get on the Floor" in March, as well as an appearance at South by Southwest later that month. During this performance, von Bohlen fainted; he had additional surgery over the next few weeks involving a plate being implanted in his head. Wood/Water was made available for streaming in its entirety on March 26, 2002, via a microsite before its April 23 release. The album spawned a single and music video for "Stop Playing Guitar". The video was posted online on May 3, and it was directed by former GusGus members Arni + Kinski. The song was also released as a single on July 9 on 7" vinyl and CD.

To promote the album, the Promise Ring began by delivering two acoustic in-store performances, and then headlined a US tour in April and May 2002, being supported by the Weakerthans. On May 24, 2002, the band performed on Late Night with Conan O'Brien, then moved on to a supporting slot on Jimmy Eat World's tour of the UK. Wood/Water was released in the UK during this stint on May 27, 2002. The Promise Ring's supporting slot for Jimmy Eat World continued into some US dates in late July and early August 2002. In September and October, the band made what would be their final appearances as part of the 2002 Plea for Peace tour.

Although the Promise Ring planned to film a video for "Suffer Never" after Plea for Peace, Epitaph and Anti- announced on October 14, 2002, that they had broken up. The band explained the following week that they had decided to focus on other projects, and had been considering parting ways for several months.

=== Related acts and reunions ===
The first side project originating from the Promise Ring began in 1999, when von Bohlen and Didier formed the acoustic side project Vermont, which featured Chris Rosenau of Pele. Seidel and Weber formed Decibully in 2001, with Gnewikow joining them briefly as their drummer. In late 2000, von Bohlen was a guest on "A Praise Chorus" by Jimmy Eat World, who the Promise Ring had befriended on tour; the song became a promotional single for its parent album, Bleed American, in 2002. In 2003, von Bohlen and Didier formed In English with Eric Axelson, formerly of the Dismemberment Plan; the group would later become known as Maritime. They released their debut studio album Glass Floor in 2004 through DeSoto Records after it had been passed on by Anti-, and have since released four more studio albums.

The Promise Ring has reunited for several reunion shows and tours. These began with a one-off show at the Flower 15 Festival in late November 2005 at Metro Chicago. Following a tweet in November 2011, the band played two reunion shows in February 2012. To coincide with the reunion, the Promise Ring announced they would be releasing a rarities collection in the summer of 2012 on former (and reunited) manager Jeff Castelaz's record label, Dangerbird Records; this collection never surfaced. Between May and September 2012, the band played a variety of US shows and festivals, including The Bamboozle, Riot Fest, and Fun Fun Fun Fest. Around the time of the latter performance, Didier said they had "no interest at all to write new music" and that they had "no plan whatsoever" to play together again. On New Year's Eve 2015, the band played Nothing Feels Good in its entirety at a one-off show at Metro Chicago; when asked about more material, Didier said: "Maybe more shows, but definitely not new music". They then appeared at the 2016 Wrecking Ball festival.

== Musical style ==
The Promise Ring's style has been described at various points throughout their career as emo, indie rock, pop-punk, power pop, and indie pop. The group began as a continuation of the founding members' previous bands: emo bands None Left Standing, Ceilishrine, and Cap'n Jazz, all of whom played a particular kind of emo localized in the Midwestern United States. The Promise Ring became known as part of "second wave" emo, which was more geographically diverse than the first; Theo Cateforis wrote in Grove Music Online that the Promise Ring became leaders of this period alongside Austin, Texas-based Mineral and Seattle, Washington-based Sunny Day Real Estate. Over the duration of their original run, the Promise Ring would progressively distance themselves from the genre, moving towards pop between Nothing Feels Good and Very Emergency and starting from scratch on Wood/Water with their new label.

Their debut record 30° Everywhere carried post-hardcore and punk rock influences, and has been praised as a benchmark and blueprint for emo as a whole. Though the band reportedly did not like the album in retrospect, it was praised for its "very catchy, very intense, [and] very powerful" material. The group opted for a cleaner, more pop-oriented sound on Nothing Feels Good, which contrasted 30° Everywhere and the punk-like approach von Bohlen used in Cap'n Jazz, with critics noting a shift toward power pop in addition to the band's already established emo sound. Nothing Feels Good is noted for pushing the band to the forefront of the emo scene, which helped to forge the way for subsequent landmark releases by their peers, such as Something to Write Home About (1999) by the Get Up Kids and Bleed American (2001) by Jimmy Eat World.

Nothing Feels Good and the Boys + Girls EP foreshadowed the Promise Ring completely shifting toward pop, which was fully displayed on Very Emergency. The sessions with Riley sparked another stylistic turn, differing significantly from that of Very Emergency; Wood/Water, the only full-length to follow the band's releases on Jade Tree, was an alternative country, indie rock, and pop album, with elements of roots rock, alternative pop, and psychedelic pop.

== Members ==
Most recent lineup

- Davey von Bohlen – vocals, guitar (1995–2002, 2005, 2011–2012, 2015–2016)
- Jason Gnewikow – guitar (1995–2002, 2005, 2011–2012, 2015–2016)
- Dan Didier – drums (1995–2002, 2005, 2011–2012, 2015–2016)
- Scott Schoenbeck – bass guitar (1998–2001, 2005, 2011–2012, 2015–2016)

Past members

- Matt Mangan – guitar (1995)
- Scott Beschta – bass guitar (1995–1997)
- Tim Burton – bass guitar (1997–1998)
- Ryan Weber – bass guitar (2001–2002)

Touring members

- William Seidel – keyboard (2001–2002)

== Discography ==
Studio albums

- 30° Everywhere (1996)
- Nothing Feels Good (1997)
- Very Emergency (1999)
- Wood/Water (2002)
