= Human Hearts (album) =

Studio album by Maritime
- Released: April 5, 2011
- Genre: Indie rock, indie pop
- Length: 35:23
- Label: Dangerbird
- Producer: Billy Bush; Mixed by Billy Bush

Maritime chronology
Heresy and the Hotel Choir (2007)	Human Hearts (2011)	Magnetic Bodies/Maps of Bones (2015)

Professional ratings
Review scores
Source	Rating
AllMusic	4/5 stars
The A.V. Club	A−
Pitchfork Media	7.2/10
Punknews.org	4.5/5 stars

Human Hearts is an album by the indie pop band Maritime. It is the band's fourth full-length album and was released on April 5, 2011.

== Track listing ==
1. "It's Casual" — 2:46
2. "Paraphernalia" — 3:26
3. "Black Bones" — 2:53
4. "Peopling of London" — 3:05
5. "Air Arizona" — 3:10
6. "Faint of Hearts" — 5:10
7. "Annihilation Eyes" — 3:13
8. "Out Numbering" — 4:01
9. "C’mon Sense" — 3:29
10. "Apple of My Irony" — 4:10
