= Nothing Feels Good =

Studio album by The Promise Ring
- Released: October 14, 1997
- Recorded: June 1997
- Studio: Easley McCain (Memphis, Tennessee)
- Genre: Emo; power pop
- Length: 33:51
- Label: Jade Tree
- Producer: J. Robbins

The Promise Ring chronology
The Horse Latitudes (1997)	Nothing Feels Good (1997)	Very Emergency (1999)

Nothing Feels Good is the second studio album by American rock band the Promise Ring, released on October 14, 1997. The Promise Ring's lineup at the time of recording comprised Davey von Bohlen on vocals and guitar, Jason Gnewikow on guitar, Scott Beschta on bass guitar, and Dan Didier on drums. Produced by J. Robbins, the album marked a shift in the band's sound, refining to a more pop aesthetic while retaining their emo sound.

Nothing Feels Good was recorded at Easley McCain Recording in June 1997. After the recording finished, Beschta was replaced by Tim Burton due to Beschta's conflicts with Didier. The band would promote the album with a US tour with Compound Red in September and October 1997, with additional tours happening through November 1997 with Jimmy Eat World and Roadside Monument.

The album has gained a cult following and is regarded as one of the most influential records of the emo genre. The title of the album was used as the name of the book Nothing Feels Good: Punk Rock, Teenagers, and Emo by Andy Greenwald.

== Background and production ==
The Promise Ring released their debut album 30° Everywhere in September 1996 through independent label Jade Tree. According to vocalist/guitarist Davey von Bohlen, it was recorded in five days "in a situation where we had no idea what we wanted to do or how we wanted it to come out." Additionally, Bohlen was ill during the making of it, resulting in issues with his vocals. Despite this, the release was an underground success, earning the group attention from independent publications. The attention was aided by the inclusion of the emo staple "A Picture Postcard", which had been released earlier on the Falsetto Keeps Time (1996) EP. The band had 500–600 copies of the album to sell over the course of several gigs, however, during one show at CBGB's, they sold all copies in one go. The band reissued their earlier work as part of The Horse Latitudes compilation in early 1997.

In April and May 1997, the group embarked on a European tour; at its conclusion, the band went on a brief break to complete writing for their next album. Guitarist Jason Gnewikow said the group worked on material through jamming. Following this, the group went to Memphis, Tennessee where they began recording at Easley McCain Recording with producer J. Robbins of Jawbox. The album saw the group focus on cleaner production and refined their pop sensibility. Robbins aided the band, helping them work on song writing and improved the overall sound, when compared to 30° Everywhere. The band toned down the punk rock-esque Midwest emo sound that Bohlen pioneered when he was a member of Cap'n Jazz. Drummer Dan Didier had a strained relationship with bassist Scott Beschta throughout the sessions: "I’m shocked that we just didn't just off one another because it was a bad time."

== Composition ==
Musically, the sound of Nothing Feels Good has been described as emo and power pop, drawing comparison to Superchunk and Knapsack. Throughout the album, Didier uses various syncopations, triplet fills and double-time cymbal hits. Beschta, instead of playing basic root notes, opted for more melodic and rhythmic basslines. Discussing the title, Bohlen said: "life is really bizarre, but at the same time, it feels totally good not to feel as if you know things". He incorporated geographical and color symbolism in his lyrics; he refers to his girlfriend as red, white and blue in "Red & Blue Jeans", while in "B Is for Bethlehem" the colors are representative of blood and flesh. While the record was not a concept album, it saw Bohlen reuse a handful of lines, giving it thematic cohesion: the title phrase Nothing Feels Good is mentioned in "Red & Blue Jeans", while being reused for the title-track, and serving as the basis for "How Nothing Feels". Similarly two lines, "not as good as the interstates are/I just can't take you that far", are used in both "Make Me a Chevy" and "A Broken Tenor". PopMatters writer Brian Stout said Bohlen "captures moments, engages in wordplay and repetitive words and phrases", and includes references to Air Supply and Television.

The opening power pop track "Is This Thing On?" begins with guitar interplay and aggressive drumming. It consists of five lines of lyrics that Bohlen repeats, and is anchored by Beschta's bass part. It leads into the punk rock-esque "Perfect Lines", which opens with Gnewikow's distorted guitar part. "Why Did Ever We Meet" was representative of the 1990s indie rock/emo sound in that it incorporated pop without abandoning the abrasiveness of punk rock. "Make Me a Chevy" sees Bohlen compare a woman to a car; it evolved out of someone tuning their instrument and Gnewikow playing harmonics over it. "How Nothing Feels" is an acoustic guitar and piano interlude with heavy tape hiss. It is followed by "A Broken Tenor", which opens with the sound of a house party, and one participant is heard quoting the Sylvia Plath poem "Daddy". The title-track sees Bohlen asking religious and personal questions, and is followed by the pop-orientated track "Pink Chimneys". An early version of the track had appeared on the (Don't Forget To) Breathe compilation. Stout said "B Is for Bethlehem" merged a "lover's spat into a thought about Jesus fishing for sinners".

== Release ==
Prior to the supporting tour for their upcoming album, Beschta was replaced by Tim Burton in August 1997. Gnewikow played with Burton in his former band None Left Standing. Didier said a rift began to form between him and Beschta, though Gnewikow said there had been long-term issues since they started the band. The group, knowing Burton and aware that he was available at the time, asked him to join them. Preceded by a US tour with Compound Red in September and October 1997, Nothing Feels Good was released on October 14, 1997, through Jade Tree. The album's artwork was shot by Jade Tree co-founder Tim Owen and designed by Gnewikow; it shows a brightly lit photograph of a boardwalk against a white background with colored dots lined up around it. It was shot in front of Trimper's Rides on the boardwalk in Ocean City, Maryland. Gnewikow credited Owen for 80% of the artwork, while he did some organisation of the process. He said of the cover: "The record is really happy, but there's also a melancholy" feeling to it, juxtaposed with the closed amusement park photo with people scattered about.

Following the album's release, the band toured the East Coast with Compound Red and Castor, and then a Midwestern tour with Compound Red and Roadside Monument, through to November 1997. They ended the month with a West Coast tour with Compound Red and Jimmy Eat World. In February 1998, the Promise Ring were traveling back home from a show, while on tour with Hum, in the midst of a snowstorm. Their van flipped over after Bohlen hit a bump on the road; Bohlen flew head-first through the windshield. Bohlen (who had head trauma), Burton (who had broken bones) and Didier, were released from hospital the following morning. Gnewikow, however, was in the intensive care unit for three further weeks due to a broken collarbone and other injuries. Since the group were feeling Burton was not working out, coupled with his broken arm, they replaced him with Scott Schoenbeck. At the time, Schoenbeck had formed Pele with Beschta, and was the brother of their roadie Mike Schoenbeck.

The band returned to touring after a six-week break, though with Gnewikow suffering intermittent pain in his collarbone from the placement of his guitar strap. They went on a tour of the Southern states, prior to an East Coast tour with Jimmy Eat World in March 1998. After a few shows with Burning Airlines, they went on another tour with Jimmy Eat World in April 1998, and then embarked on a European trek with Jets to Brazil. A music video was made for "Why Did Ever We Meet", directed by Darren Doane, and featured Jade Tree co-founder Darren Walters, Ken Dario, Chris Duncan and Mike Schoenbeck. It shows the band performing in a living room, cut with footage of a game of football, a man swimming and rollerblading. It appeared on MTV's 120 Minutes, which the members subsequently hosted and were interviewed on by Matt Pinfield. The Promise Ring toured with Jets to Brazil again shortly afterwards, across the US in October and Japan in November. The album was re-pressed on vinyl alongside 30° Everywhere and Very Emergency (1999), and received its first cassette edition, in October 2015. A few months later, the band performed the album in its entirety during a one-off reunion show.

== Reception and legacy ==
Professional ratings
Review scores
Source	Rating
AllMusic	4/5 stars
The Encyclopedia of Popular Music	3/5 stars
Pitchfork	8.6/10
Punknews.org	5/5 stars
Wondering Sound	Favorable

=== Critical response ===
Nothing Feels Good received favorable reviews from music critics. AllMusic reviewer Blake Butler said the release saw the group move into more poppy territory that they had previously teased on 30° Everywhere. While Nothing Feels Good continued the "beautifully odd" lyricism against "extremely catchy and powerful music," its overall sound conjured up "sentimentality and imagination" that their "music always seems to exude." Ox-Fanzine's Joachim Hiller complimented Bohlen's improved vocals, serving as a weakness on their previous record. He called it a "seemingly calm" album that "strings together twelve melancholic-melodic guitar pop pearls." Punk Planet writer Dan Sinker said it blew "everything they've previously done out of the water", receiving the "production they deserve", which "allows them to shine through the entire album".

Pitchfork writer Nick Mirov felt that the "dearth of lyrics" was the release's "Achilles' heel". He added that Bohlen would repetitively sing "the same three lines over and over;" it served as a "minor blemish on an otherwise damn good album." In a retrospective review, Punknews.org staff member Joe Pelone said the record acted as the best starting point for people wishing to get into the group, calling it "catchy, rocking and heartfelt in equal measures." Bohlen's lyrics landed in the middle of two ideologies: "'90s indie rock bands [that] wrote really good, lo-fi rock songs that weren't actually about anything" and emo acts that "mean[t] everything."

=== Aftermath and accolades ===
Nothing Feels Good pushed the band to the forefront of the emo music scene, forging the way for releases such as Something to Write Home About (1999) by the Get Up Kids and Bleed American (2001) by Jimmy Eat World. The band became the most successful emo act of the era with sales of Nothing Feels Good reaching the mid-five figures, becoming a defining album in the genre's second wave. Paste writer Justin Jacobs said that "few albums sum up the mid-'90s emo movement in sound or attitude" than Nothing Feels Good. Bohlen later featured on "A Praise Chorus", a track from Bleed American, where he referenced "Why Did Ever We Meet". Mike Damante of the Houston Chronicle said "Red & Blue Jeans" acted as a blueprint for the likes of Taking Back Sunday and New Found Glory. Similarly, the polaroid-esque aesthetic of the album's cover influenced countless other emo groups. Eduardo Cepeda of Vice said the artwork was "one of the quintessential visual cues in the emo canon," and also within Jade Tree's roster as Owen and Gnewikow worked on a lot of releases for the label. In a 2002 interview, Gnewikow said that while he loved the album, it "colored everything we did after that because we were reacting to it".

Nothing Feels Good has appeared on various best-of emo album lists by Drowned in Sound, Kerrang!, LA Weekly, Louder, Rolling Stone, and Treblezine, as well as by journalists Leslie Simon and Trevor Kelley in their book Everybody Hurts: An Essential Guide to Emo Culture (2007). Similarly, tracks from it have appeared on best-of emo songs lists by NME, Stereogum and Vulture. The album's title was used for the book of the same name by Andy Greenwald. Mike Kinsella covered "Forget Me" under the moniker Owen for this album Other People's Songs (2014).

== Track listing ==
No.	Title	Length
1.	"Is This Thing On?"	3:37
2.	"Perfect Lines"	2:25
3.	"Red & Blue Jeans"	2:54
4.	"Why Did Ever We Meet"	4:05
5.	"Make Me a Chevy"	2:35
6.	"How Nothing Feels"	1:12
7.	"A Broken Tenor"	3:24
8.	"Raspberry Rush"	2:34
9.	"Nothing Feels Good"	2:01
10.	"Pink Chimneys"	2:26
11.	"B Is for Bethlehem"	3:15
12.	"Forget Me"	3:52

== Personnel ==
- Davey von Bohlen – vocals, guitar
- Jason Gnewikow – guitar
- Scott Beschta – bass guitar
- Dan Didier – drums
