= Texas Is the Reason =

American post-hardcore band

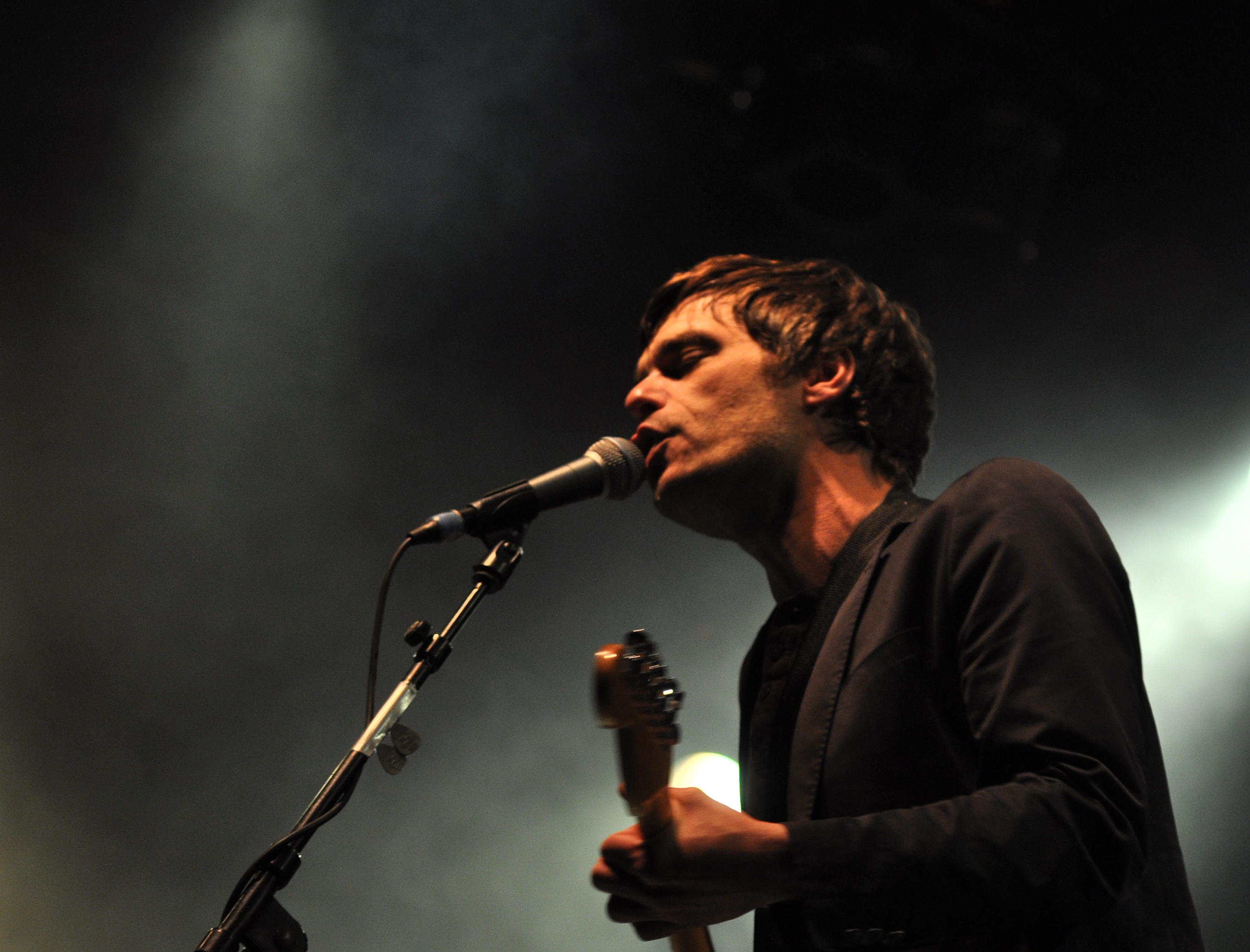
- Garrett Klahn with Texas Is the Reason at Groezrock Festival in 2013

Background information
- Origin: New York City, U.S.
- Genres: Post-hardcore; emo; indie rock
- Years active: 1994–1997; 2006; 2012–2013; 2016; 2025–present
- Labels: Revelation; Your Choice; Jade Tree; Art Monk Construction
- Spinoffs: Jets to Brazil; New End Original; Project Kate
- Spinoff of: Shelter; 108
- Members: Chris Daly; Scott Winegard; Garrett Klahn; John Herguth
- Past members: Norman Brannon
- Website: texasisthereason.com

Texas Is the Reason is an American post-hardcore band, founded by former Shelter guitarist Norman Brannon and 108 drummer Chris Daly in 1994. They disbanded in 1997, held brief reunions in 2006 and 2012–2013, and reformed again in 2025 with plans entering 2026.

== History ==
=== Formation, Do You Know Who You Are? and break-up (1994–97) ===
Norman Brannon (a.k.a. Norm Arenas), guitarist for Krishnacore band Shelter, formed Texas Is the Reason with friend and fellow Krishna devotee Chris Daly (formerly of 108) in New York City. Both wished to forgo the macho attitude and religious preaching of their former projects. Ex-Fountainhead member Scott Winegard (bass) was the next to join, after which guitarist and vocalist Garrett Klahn (formerly of Buffalo-based bands Copper and Support) was recruited to round out the quartet.

The band's name was suggested by The Van Pelt frontman Chris Leo, who informed them that the Van Pelt had considered naming themselves "Texas Is the Reason", taken from the Misfits song "Bullet". It also refers to a conspiracy theory about the assassination of John F. Kennedy, which suggests that the president was killed in a plot arranged by Texas Democrats, in order to give Lyndon B. Johnson control of the White House.

According to Brannon, major labels became interested in Texas is the Reason as early as their first show, but the band instead opted to sign a two-album deal with independent hardcore label Revelation Records. Brannon has also said that the band signed the deal "thinking the majors would back off, but then they basically started trying to make offers to buy Revelation."

The 1995 release of their self-titled debut EP made Texas Is the Reason an underground phenomenon, and inspired many bands to adopt a similar style. The same year also saw the release of a split single with Samuel, through British record label Simba. The band continued pushing forward in 1996, with the release of their first full-length album, Do You Know Who You Are?. This was followed by a split single with The Promise Ring, which was released on the Jade Tree label.

The title Do You Know Who You Are? was reportedly named after the last statement John Lennon heard prior to his death. Produced by Jawbox's J.Robbins and released on Revelation Records, the album drew considerable attention from major labels. This resulted from Texas Is the Reason being pegged as "the next big thing," due to the growing punk explosion on MTV. Song titles from the album, such as "The Magic Bullet Theory" and "Back and to the Left" were further allusions to various Kennedy assassination theories.

On the eve of signing with Capitol Records in 1997, the band flew overseas for a European tour. At this stage, the reality of being on a major label had caused considerable tension within the band. Before their final tour stop in Bielefeld, Germany, Daly and Brannon agreed that if the show was "awesome", it would be their last. As Brannon later recalled, "I walked on stage and we opened with 'Antique' and when Garrett started singing, there were eight hundred Germans singing along with us. I looked at Daly and knew that this was over."

=== Post-break-up and reunions (1998–present) ===
The former members headed off to various musical projects, with Klahn forming New Rising Sons (1998) and Solea (2001) with Serge Lobokoff of Samiam. Daly concurrently started indie outfit Jets to Brazil with Blake Schwartzenbach of Jawbreaker. Winegard played in the band Americans, and began releasing various bands' records through an imprint label he co-owns called GrapeOS. The only member to go inactive in the world of indie rock was guitarist Norman Brannon, who moved to Chicago and worked as a DJ for almost three years.

Winegard and Brannon joined Charlie Walker of Chamberlain and Jonah Matranga of Far and Onelinedrawing to form the band New End Original, which lasted from 2000 to 2003. Klahn's New Rising Sons released two EPs through GrapeOS, and later signed to Virgin Records. They disbanded after being dropped by the label, but reformed in 2008. Klahn now plays in the band Atlantic/Pacific with John Herguth of House & Parish. Daly left the now-defunct Jets to Brazil sometime after their 2002 release, Perfecting Loneliness.

After nine years apart, Texas Is the Reason decided to mark the tenth anniversary of Do You Know Who You Are by reuniting for a single show at New York City's Irving Plaza on November 25, 2006. This was partly motivated by the band members dissatisfaction with not having played a final show in their city of origin. They also insisted that the reunion shows were a one-time event, and said there were no plans for additional shows: "While we empathize with everyone who wants to come to the show, but can't come for any reason, this will not become a tour and we are not reforming the band. That is as clear a statement as anyone can make." The show sold out quickly, resulting in the addition of a second show on the following night. Winegard, along with members of other emo bands, formed House & Parish in June 2007.

In January 2012, it was announced that Revelation Records would be holding a 25th anniversary celebration at The Glass House in Pomona, California. The event was scheduled for July of the same year. The band members had been approached about the possibility of another reunion, but ultimately refused. Nonetheless, Daly traveled to California for the anniversary show (which featuring a reunited Quicksand), and later expressed excitement about the prospect of another reunion for Texas is the Reason. The band then agreed to headline the opening night of Revelation's east coast event in October 2012, at New York's Irving Plaza. Tickets sold out immediately after going on sale, so a second night was added at the Music Hall of Williamsburg. Daly was quoted as saying, "It's like we have this really cool old car that's in really great shape…it's not built for, like, a cross-country trip, but it's good to take out and drive around the neighborhood."

After a European tour, Texas Is the Reason played their final reunion show at the Electric Ballroom in London on August 4, 2013. Subsequent performances included a 20th anniversary show for Do You Know Who You Are? (on March 15, 2016), and a memorial concert for Jon Bunch.

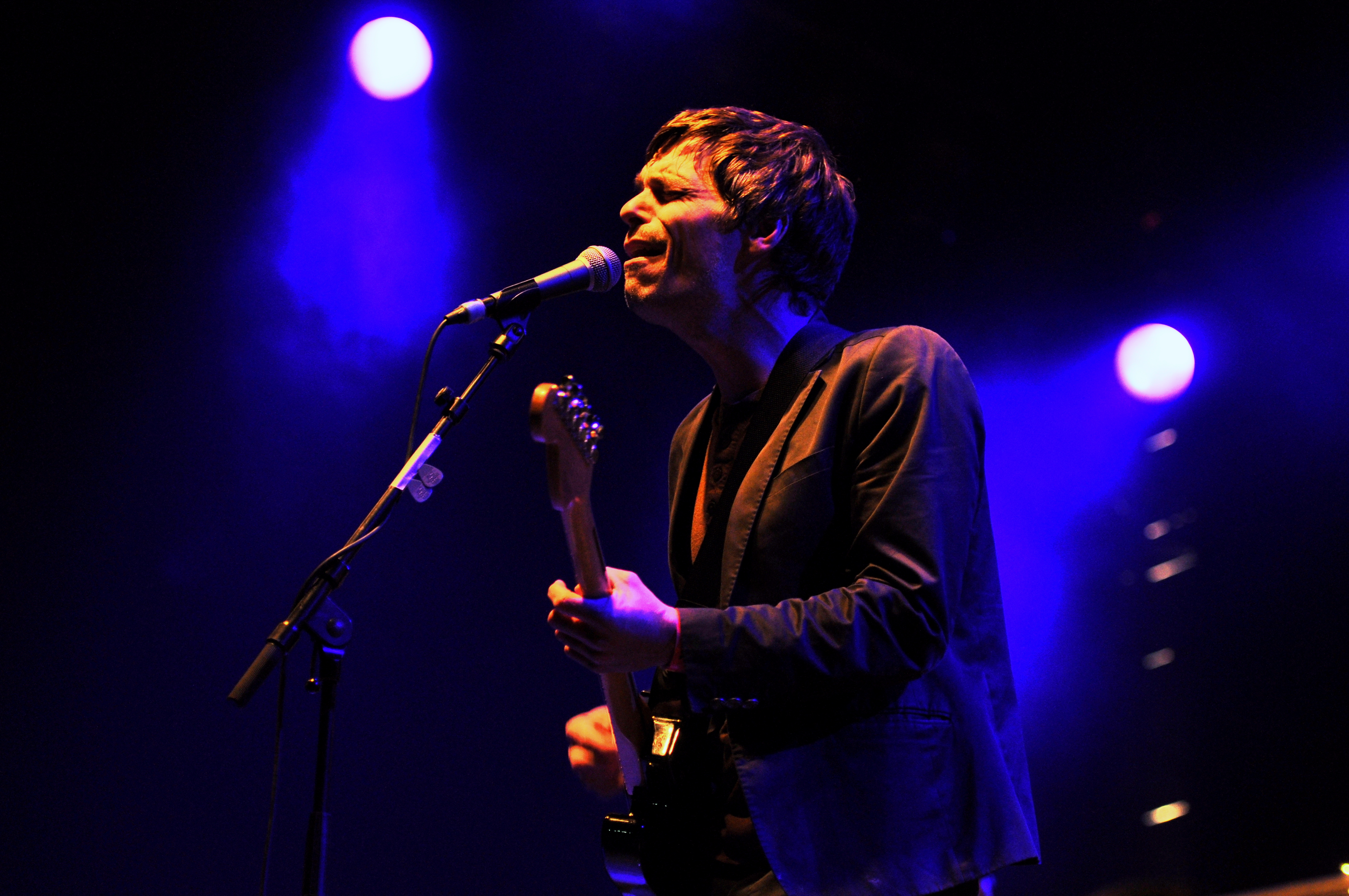
Garrett Klahn, 2013

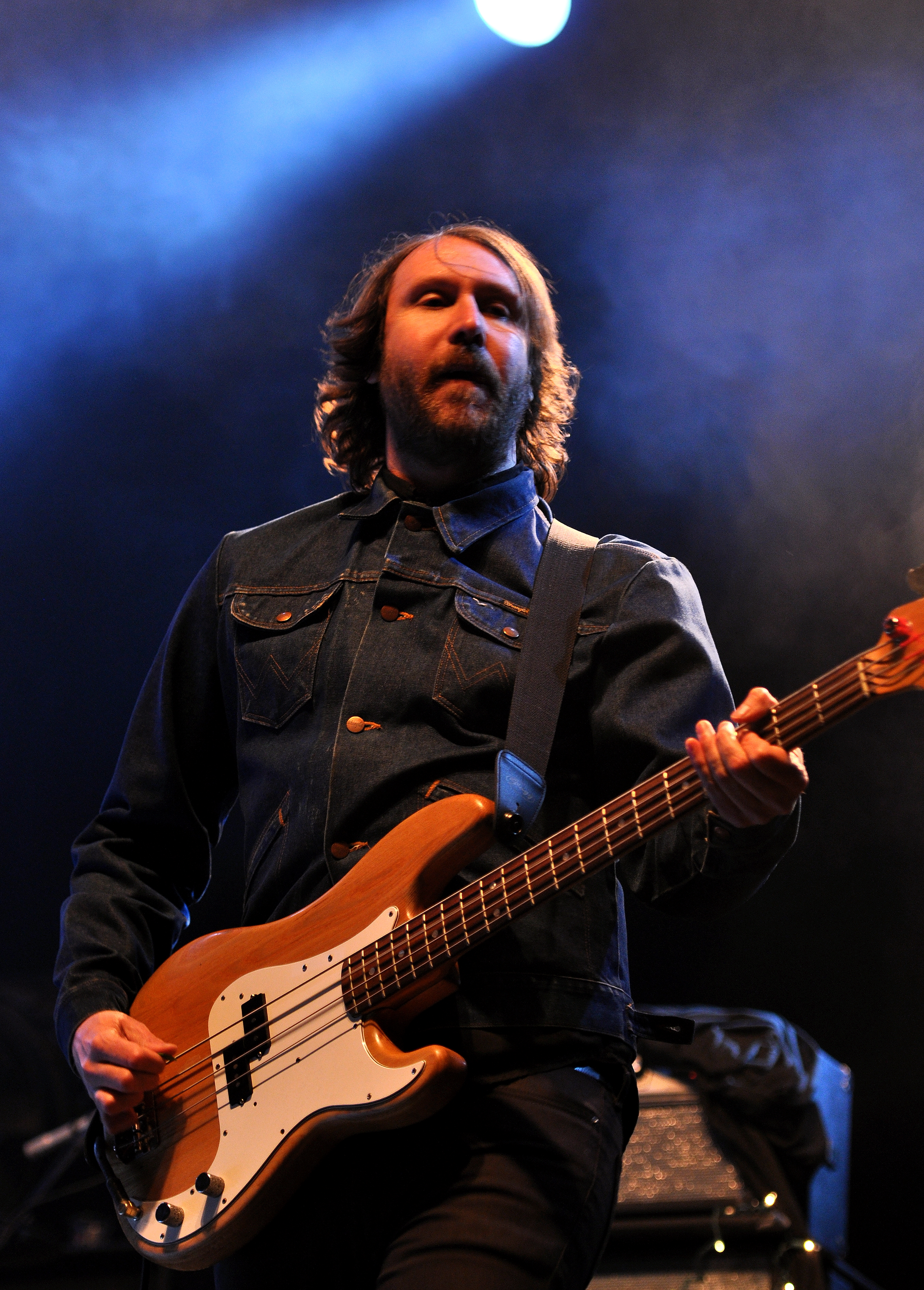
Scott Winegard, 2013

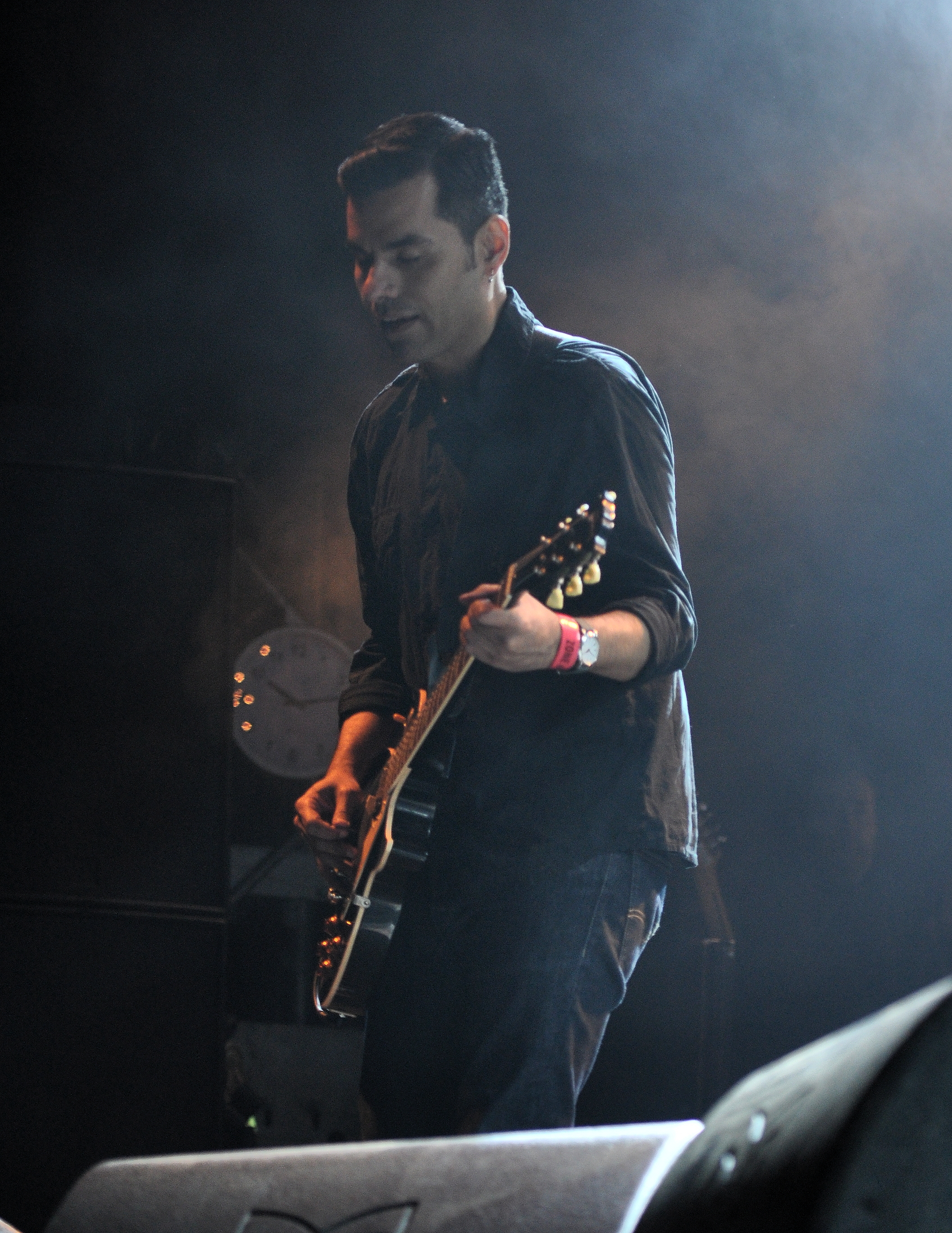
Norman Brannon, 2013

Texas is the Reason reunited again in 2025. However, guitarist Norman Brannon said he would not be participating, because of negative associations he had with being a closeted gay man during the band's existence in the 1990s.

== Band members ==
Current

- Garrett Klahn – lead vocals, guitars (1994–1997, 2006, 2012–2013, 2016, 2025–present)
- Scott Winegard – bass (1994–1997, 2006, 2012–2013, 2016, 2025–present)
- Chris Daly – drums (1994–1997, 2006, 2012–2013, 2016, 2025–present)
- John Herguth – guitars (2025–present)

Former

- Norman Brannon – guitars (1994–1997, 2006, 2012–2013, 2016)

== Discography ==
=== Studio albums ===
- Do You Know Who You Are? (1996, Revelation)

=== Split albums ===
- Your Choice Live Series 037 – Split live album with Samiam (1999, Your Choice)

=== EPs ===
- Texas Is the Reason (1995, Revelation) (Note: This EP is sometimes referred to as If It's Here When We Get Back It's Ours)
- Texas Is the Reason / Samuel (1995, Simba Recordings & Art Monk Construction)
- Texas Is the Reason / The Promise Ring (1996, Jade Tree)
