= Jade Tree (record label) =

American independent record label

- Founded: 1990
- Country of origin: United States
- Location: Wilmington, Delaware

Jade Tree International, Inc. is an independent record label formed by Darren Walters and Tim Owen in 1990 in Wilmington, Delaware.

== History ==
=== Origin (1987–1990) ===
In 1987, Tim Owen and Darren Walters were introduced during a punk show in Washington, D.C.

At the time, Walters was a student at the University of Delaware where he had already independently released records on his label, Hi-Impact Records. To further these musical pursuits, Darren teamed up with Rochester Institute of Technology student Tim Owen, and his friend Carl Hedgepath. Together, they created their own label, Axtion Packed Records.

Both Axtion Packed and Hi-Impact focused on straight edge hardcore and produced vinyl records in 45 format.

In an effort to expand musical genres and format, Axtion Packed Records was dissolved in 1990 to form Jade Tree Records. Owens and Walters modeled their new label on established independent's Touch & Go out of Chicago and Washington, D.C.'s Dischord Records.

=== Growth and becoming established (1991–1996) ===
In August of 1991, Jade Tree made their inaugural release, Culture Shock by the hardcore band Four Walls Falling. The album art included original photography by Owens.

The new label started with many post-hardcore and noise rock bands, though these bands didn't garner much interest from the public. It wasn't until 1993, when Jade Tree released the album No Punches Pulled by DC area hardcore band, Swiz, did the label start receiving recognition.

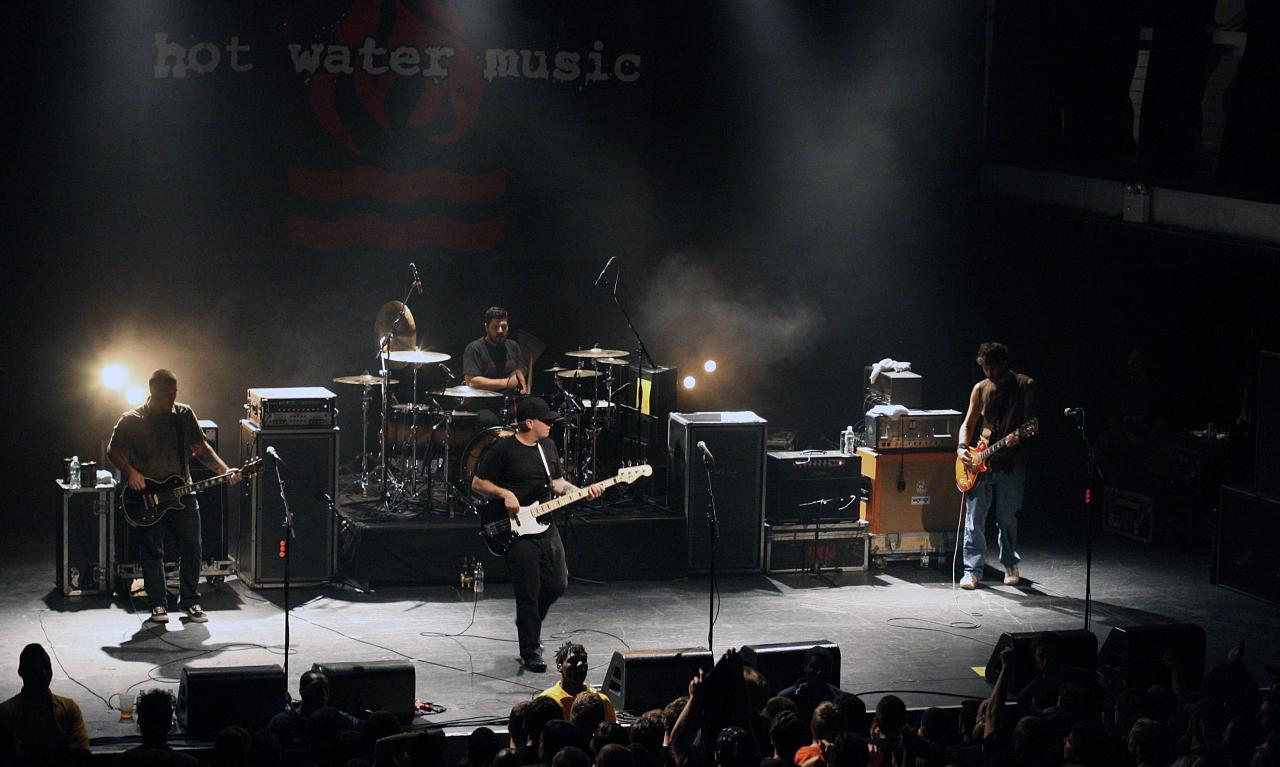
Hot Water Music 2008

The label began incorporating emo, punk, melodic hardcore, and experimental groups into their line-up. Through college, they grew the label into a stable roster by 1995.

By 1994, Jade Tree was becoming less of a priority to the two founders. Owen had moved to New York City to attend the School Of Visual Arts to further his photography education. Walters remained in their native Delaware, where he worked in education, focusing on disadvantaged students. A newfound interest was once again sparked, when the pair heard an unreleased demo by the band Lifetime. By the fall of 1995, the band had officially signed with Jade Tree, and together they released the album Hello Bastards. This album would serve as the turning point for Jade Tree.

In 1996, sales started to increase after the label released The Promise Ring's 30° Everywhere. The label often used the graphic designers Jason Gnewikow and Jeremy Dean for many releases.

=== Middle years (1997–2008) ===
Bands signed by Jade Tree have released albums which saw regular radio play, including Alkaline Trio, Pedro the Lion, Jets to Brazil, and Joan of Arc.

=== Downsizing (2009–2013) ===
When key distributor Touch and Go Records downsized in 2009 Jade Tree scaled down too. This led to a lessening of the frequency of new releases from the label.

=== Digital release and regrowth (2014–2016) ===
Jade Tree made its entire discography available for digital download and streaming on Bandcamp in June 2014. This marked a planned increase in the number of new releases.

In February 2015, the label signed the band Dogs on Acid.

=== Epitaph purchase (2017–present) ===
In 2017 Epitaph Records purchased Jade Tree's entire catalog and started to re-release the back catalogue on vinyl.

== Bands signed ==
- Alkaline Trio
- Avail
- Breather Resist
- Cap'n Jazz
- Cex
- Cloak/Dagger
- Cub Country
- Damnation AD
- Dark Blue
- Denali
- Despistado
- Dogs on Acid
- Edsel
- Eggs
- Eidolon
- Ester Drang
- Euphone
- The Explosion
- Four Walls Falling
- From Ashes Rise
- Fucked Up
- Girls Against Boys
- Gravel
- Jets to Brazil
- Joan of Arc
- Jones Very
- Juno
- Kid Dynamite
- Leslie
- Lifetime
- Lords
- Leather
- The Loved Ones
- Micah P. Hinson
- Mighty Flashlight
- Milemarker
- New End Original
- New Mexican Disaster Squad
- The New Old Hopes
- Onelinedrawing
- Owls
- Paint It Black
- Panda & Angel
- Pedro the Lion
- Pitchblende
- The Promise Ring
- Railhed
- Snowden
- Spraynard
- State of the Nation
- Statistics
- Strike Anywhere
- Sweetbelly Freakdown
- Swiz
- Texas Is The Reason
- These Arms Are Snakes
- Trial By Fire
- Turing Machine
- Turning Point
- Universal Order of Armageddon
- Walleye
- Young Widows

== See also ==
- List of record labels
- Music of Delaware
