= Owls (album) =

Studio album by Owls
- Released: July 31, 2001
- Recorded: April 2001
- Studio: Electrical Audio, Chicago, Illinois
- Genre: Emo; indie rock
- Length: 35:37
- Label: Jade Tree

Owls chronology
Owls (2001)	Two (2014)

Owls is the debut studio album by American rock band Owls, which was released on July 31, 2001, through Jade Tree. After the disbandment of Joan of Arc, frontman Tim Kinsella reunited with the former members of Cap'n Jazz to form Owls. They recorded with Steve Albini at Electrical Audio in Chicago, Illinois, in April 2001. The album is an emo and indie rock record that has been compared with the works of Ghosts and Vodka, Pavement, and Captain Beefheart.

Owls received generally favorable reviews from music critics, some of whom noted influence from the members' other bands, while others found it uninspired. Rolling Stone ranked the album on their 2016 list of the 40 best emo albums. It was promoted with tours of the US and Europe before the members shifted focus on other projects. Following an appearance at CMJ Musicfest in late 2002, Owls broke up.

== Background and production ==
In mid 2000, Joan of Arc frontman Tim Kinsella reunited with the former members of Cap'n Jazz, namely his brother Mike as the drummer, guitarist Victor Villarreal, and bassist Sam Zurick. The reunion did not include Davey von Bohlen, who was busy with his band the Promise Ring. The new act, which was called Civil War, performed at a fundraising show then spent one week working on songs. In September 2000, Joan of Arc released The Gap through independent label Jade Tree. To promote the album, Joan of Arc, with Zurick in the line-up, embarked on an unsuccessful tour and were greeted with tiny crowds, and the band experienced internal strife.

The Gap was met with a negative reception; both AllMusic and Pitchfork found it hard to listen to, and the Chicago Tribune would later say the same. Joan of Arc played another US show, by which point communication between members had broken down. In January 2001, the band performed four dates in Japan, before breaking up. Over a year after their inception, Civil War was reintroduced to the public as Owls. Steve Albini recorded Owls at Electrical Audio in Chicago, Illinois, in April 2001; the recordings were mastered by John Golden at John Holden Mastering. Tim Kinsella said Albini was crucial to the project; "If we are gonna do this, record to tape, record all live – it needs to be Albini".

== Composition and songs ==
Owls is an emo and indie rock album that drew comparisons with Ghosts and Vodka, which shared members with Owls; the lo-fi energy of Pavement, and the jazz blues of Captain Beefheart. Kinsella's abstract lyricism was influenced by the work of E. E. Cummings, and his vocal style was compared to those of Lou Reed and Neil Young, while Villarreal incorporated American Football-esque arpeggios. His guitar work was described as similar to his recordings with Ghosts and Vodka, as well as Don Caballero's American Don (2000). Mike Kinsella's drumming, coupled with Zurick's bass parts, provides structures and varying tempos similar to those of Joan of Arc and accompany Tim's off-kilter vocal performances.

The first two tracks "What Whorse You Wrote Id On" and "Anyone Can Have a Good Time" include bongos and tambourine. In the latter track, Tim Kinsella sings about heredity and marriage, while its coda sees him pondering a conventional band format. "I Want the Quiet Moments of a Party Girl" includes references to the Harper's Magazine essay "Who Goes Nazi?" (1941). "Everyone Is My Friend" is a math rock song, with jangling guitar parts and upbeat drum patterns that drew comparisons with the work of Sunny Day Real Estate. "I Want the Blindingly Cute to Confide in Me", which is reminiscent of The Gap, epitomizes the musical forms of Owls; pseudo-jazz rhythms, Andy Summers-esque guitar playing, intermittent vocal melodies, and Kinsella's lyrical style. The titles of "For Nate's Brother Whose Name I Never Knew or Can't Remember" and "Life in the Hair Salon-Themed Bar on the Island" refer to Tim and Mike's cousin Nate Kinsella and a New-York-City nightclub chain, respectively. "Life in the Hair Salon-Themed Bar on the Island" is an indie rock track that incorporates influence from Frank Zappa; it exemplifies Villarreal's guitar abilities. The second half of the closing track "Holy Fucking Ghost" has several tempo changes and is sung from the perspective of a depressed bartender who drinks alcohol to cope.

== Release and reception ==
=== Promotion ===
As Joan of Arc's break up became public in early May 2001, Jade Tree announced the release of Owls' self-titled album. It was made available for pre-order from mid-May and was released on July 31 of the same year. The Japanese edition, which was released through Quattro Disc, includes a bonus track called "Later". Between August and October 2001, the band embarked on a cross-country US tour. Mike Kinsella left Owls to focus on his solo project Owen and was replaced by Ryan Rapsys. In the lead-up to the Christmas period, the band went on a European tour, during which they missed six performances because their van broke down. By the end of the tour, the members of Owls had all focused on other projects: Tim Kinsella spent early 2002 working on Friend/Enemy's debut album and a new Joan of Arc album, and Villarreal and Zurick continued their work on Ghosts and Vodka. Owls performed at CMJ Musicfest in October 2002, before disbanding some time later.

=== Reception ===
Professional ratings
Review scores
Source	Rating
AllMusic	4/5 stars
The Austin Chronicle	3/4 stars
Kerrang!	4/5 stars
Nude as the News	7.5/10
Pitchfork	7.0/10
Stylus Magazine	6.5/10

Owls was met with generally favorable reviews from music critics. AllMusic reviewer Peter J. D'Angelo wrote Owls is partially removed from the members' projects, though it still contains "plenty of off-kilter" moments. He said Kinsella's "instantly recognizable voice" is "pretty smooth for his fairly straightforward but still a little off-key vocal performances". Michael Chamy of The Austin Chronicle called the album "mostly a breath of fresh air, even if it seems a bit unsure at times". The Cleveland Scene writer Brian Baker wrote Kinsella warbles "in a key only he can hear" against a backdrop of music that "stays primarily within the parameters" of his past bands. Cam Lindsay of Exclaim! said the album "sounds great", and that despite featuring both Tim and Mike Kinsella, it was effected using "no computers, no abstractions, [and] no experimenting". Lindsay added the former's "scratched blackboard of a voice" sings the "same brand of intellectual lyrics" as before. Nude as the News writer Phil Lindert said it "almost seems like the product of an energized American Football, with little bells and whistles added for good measure".

CMJ New Music Monthly's Franklin Bruno also mentioned elements of the members of Owls' previous acts, and said the band's performances "improve immeasurably" on their earlier works. The staff of Impact Press said the "experimental tangents are more reigned in", making the tracks "more coherent". Pitchfork contributor Camilo Arturo Leslie praised Owls for being "back in strong form" after Cap'n Jazz, coming across as an "odd concoction of opposing and random musical and emotional trajectories". Evan Chakroff of Stylus Magazine said the album is "nothing special", having heard its sound being "done better by other bands", and noted the nonsensical lyrics are either the "ramblings of a burnt out fool or transcendent works of genius". LAS Magazine's Ryan Allen said Owls is "slightly uninspired at times", but with "enough going on to keep things interesting". He added it has insufficient "envelope pushing going on to really make much of an impact". Ox-Fanzine reviewer Joachim Hiller called the band "terrible" and said the album became irritating "after just three songs".

Owls was included in The A.V. Club's Best Music of the Decade "orphan" list for the 2000s, which is reserved for albums that did not make the original list. It also appeared on Rolling Stone's 2016 list of the 40 best emo albums. Similarly, "Everyone Is My Friend" appeared on Vulture's list of the best emo songs.

== Track listing ==
Track listing per booklet.

Owls standard track listing

1. "What Whorse You Wrote Id On" – 4:07
2. "Anyone Can Have a Good Time" – 5:34
3. "I Want the Quiet Moments of a Party Girl" – 3:43
4. "Everyone Is My Friend" – 3:26
5. "I Want the Blindingly Cute to Confide in Me" – 5:58
6. "For Nate's Brother Whose Name I Never Knew or Can't Remember" – 2:57
7. "Life in the Hair Salon-Themed Bar on the Island" – 3:43
8. "Holy Fucking Ghost" – 6:09

Japanese bonus track

9. "Later" – 4:16

== Personnel ==
Personnel per booklet.

Owls

- Mike Kinsella – drums
- Tim Kinsella – lead vocals
- Victor Villareal – guitar
- Sam Zurick – bass

Production and design

- Steve Albini – recording
- John Golden – mastering
- Owls – self-portraits
- Paul Koob – graphic design
