= TTNG =

British rock band

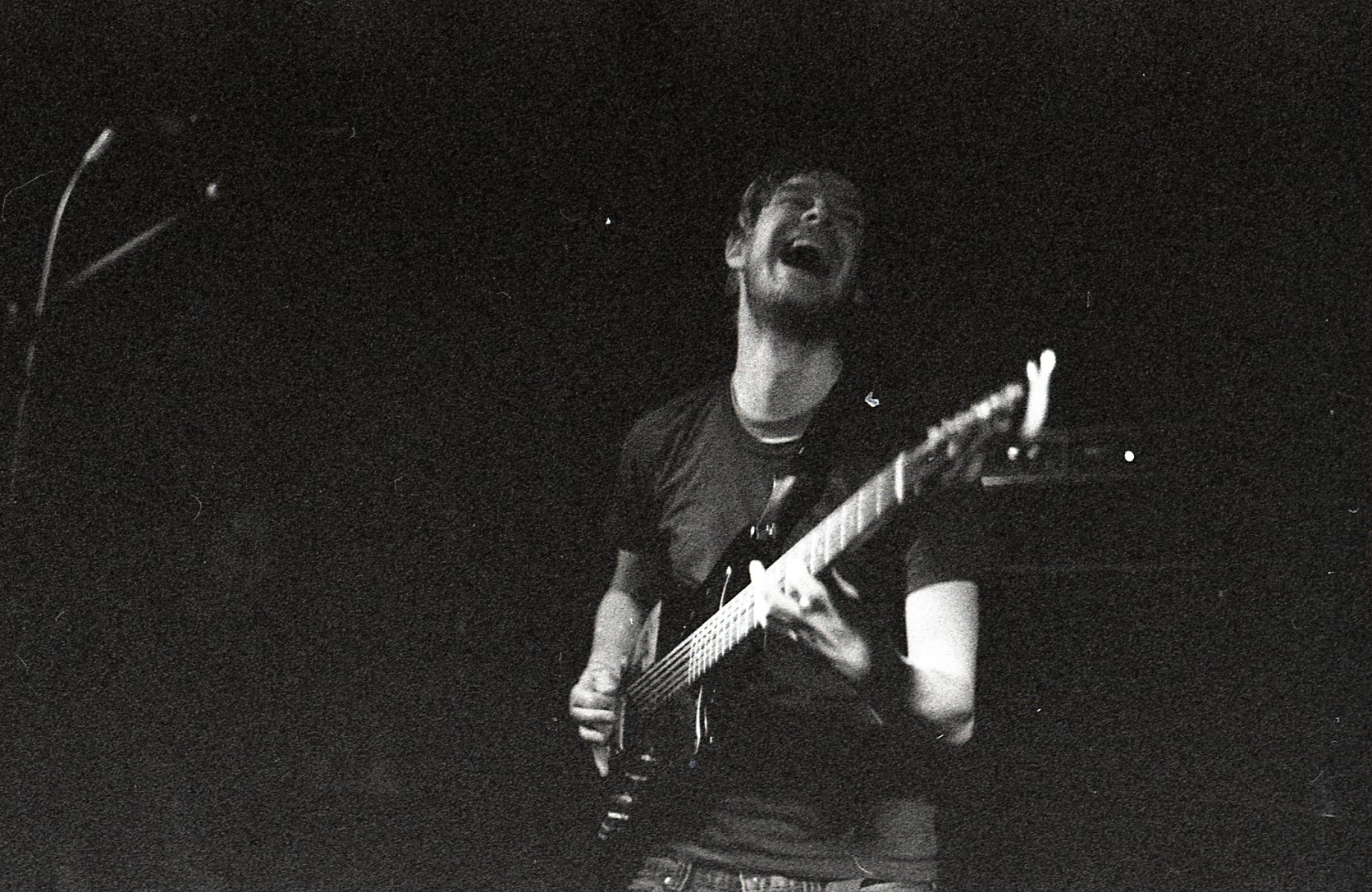

Background information
- Origin: Oxford, England
- Genres: Indie rock; math rock; emo
- Years active: 2002–present
- Labels: Sargent House, Big Scary Monsters
- Members: Henry Tremain; Tim Collis; Chris Collis; Stuart Smith
- Past members: Simon Thompson; Ian Lewis; Matt Bennington; Jamie Cooper; Dan Adams; Jody Prewett
- Website: ttng.band

TTNG (formerly known as This Town Needs Guns) are a British math rock band from Oxford, formed in 2002.

Following numerous lineup changes, the band's most recent 2026 release Juggling Moves (Beginner) features Henry Tremain on bass and lead vocals, Tim Collis on guitar, his brother Chris Collis on drums, and a newly returning member Stuart Smith on guitar and lead vocals. Their debut full-length album, Animals, was released in the UK via Big Scary Monsters Recording Company in October 2008 and shortly after in the US via Sargent House Records. They have released four studio albums, as well as numerous EPs and singles.

The band is currently signed to the American label Sargent House Records.

== History ==
The band formed in 2002 in Oxford. The original lineup consisted of Stuart Smith on rhythm guitar and vocals, Tim Collis on lead guitar, Simon Thompson on drums and Ian Lewis on bass. Thompson and Lewis left the band in 2005, to be replaced by Dan Adams on bass (replaced by Jamie Cooper after the recording of Animals in 2008) and Matt Bennington on drums (replaced by Chris Collis, brother of guitarist Tim, in 2006). In their earlier careers, bassist Jamie Cooper had worked as a graphic designer, drummer Chris Collis had been a librarian at the University of Oxford, guitarist Tim Collis was a primary school teacher, and lead vocalist Stuart Smith worked building websites for a publisher. On 11 May 2011, it was announced on This Town Needs Guns' website that lead singer Stuart Smith would be leaving the band to start a family, and that he would be replaced by Pennines' singer and guitarist Henry Tremain. Bassist Jamie Cooper also left the band in late 2011 to focus on a career in graphic design. Tremain has since taken over on bass guitar duties, converting the band into a power trio.

On 14 September 2012, the first track from the second album 13.0.0.0.0, entitled "Cat Fantastic" was released on digital streaming platforms. The album was released on 22 January 2013.

Their third album, Disappointment Island, was released in July 2016.

In 2017, the whole band was arrested in Hong Kong during an immigration raid on the final show of their tour.

In July 2018, the band announced a 10-year anniversary tour of Animals, in which Smith would be returning to the band to play with them for the first time in seven years. In October of that year, an acoustic version of the album entitled Animals Acoustic was released.

In August 2026 the band released a new EP entitled Juggling Moves (Beginner), which saw Smith return to the band.

== Musical style and influences ==
Over the years, the band's musical style has progressed and changed, although the consistent focal point of their style has been the guitar work of Tim Collis interspersed with, at points, highly complex drumming and sparse, melodic bass. Early releases, however, featured more distorted chord progressions, as well as a strong focus on the interlinking melodies of both Collis and Smith's guitars. The Sydney Morning Herald describes the band's music as having "intricate pop guitar work, with a touch of jazz and Spanish influences".

The band are largely inspired by Chicago bands Ghosts and Vodka, Maps & Atlases, Owen, Owls, Russian Circles, Them Roaring Twenties, Anathallo, Colossal, Birthmark, American Football, Joan of Arc and Make Believe, as well as the British bands Andy, Glenn and Ritch, the Little Explorer and the Jesus Years.

They have been cited as an influence by Yvette Young.

== Name change ==
With the release of 13.0.0.0.0 the band announced that they would be calling themselves TTNG. They stated that the name was ironic because guns are hardly present in their hometown of Oxford, and the UK in general. As the band became more known around the world, the name was no longer clearly ironic. The band also felt uncomfortable with their name due to the issues of gun violence and mass shootings worldwide and in particular the US and wanted to distance themselves from those associations.

== Personnel ==
=== Current members ===
- Tim Collis – guitar (2002–present)
- Chris Collis – drums, percussion (2006–present)
- Henry Tremain – lead vocals (2011–2018, 2019–present), bass (2012–present), guitar (2011–2012, 2016–2018), backing vocals (2018–2019)
- Stuart Smith – lead vocals, guitar (2002–2011, 2018–2019, 2026-present)

=== Former members ===
- Simon Thompson – drums (2002–2005)
- Ian Lewis – bass (2002–2005)
- Matt Bennington – drums (2005–2006)
- Dan Adams – bass, trumpet (2005–2008)
- Jody Prewett – piano, guitar, backing vocals (2007–2008)
- Jamie Cooper – bass, backing vocals (2008–2011)

==== Former touring musicians ====
- Chris Baker – bass, guitar (2012)
- Henry Kohen – bass (2016–2018)
- Garrett Karp – trumpet, piano, additional percussion (2018–2019)

== Discography ==
=== Albums ===
- Animals (BSM - October 2008, Sargent House - January 2009)
- 13.0.0.0.0 (Sargent House - January 2013)
- Disappointment Island (Sargent House - July 2016)

=== Reimagined albums ===
- Animals Acoustic (Sargent House - October 2018)

=== EPs ===
- First Demo (2003)
- Split CD with Cats and Cats and Cats (Big Scary Monsters - 2007)
- This Town Needs Guns (Yellow Ghost - 2008, Rallye - 2008)
- Juggling Moves (Beginner) (2026)

=== Singles ===
- "Hippy Jam Fest" (Big Scary Monsters - 2006)
- "And I'll Tell You For Why..." (Big Scary Monsters - 2007)
- "Pig" (Single Split with Pennines) (Big Scary Monsters - 2008)
- "Adventure, Stamina & Anger" (Sargent House - 2011)
