= Shmap'n Shmazz =

1995 Midwest emo album by Cap'n Jazz

Studio album by Cap'n Jazz
- Released: 1995
- Recorded: December 27–31, 1994
- Studio: Idful (Chicago)
- Genres: Midwest emo; post-hardcore; math rock; art punk
- Length: 31:10
- Labels: Man With Gun; Polyvinyl
- Producer: Casey Rice

Cap'n Jazz chronology
Shmap'n Shmazz (1995)	Analphabetapolothology (1998)

Burritos, Inspiration Point, Fork Balloon Sports, Cards in the Spokes, Automatic Biographies, Kites, Kung Fu, Trophies, Banana Peels We've Slipped On, and Egg Shells We've Tippy Toed Over, more commonly known as Shmap'n Shmazz, (Note: The name Shmap'n Shmazz comes from the compact disc's face. This article uses Shmap'n Shmazz to refer to the album for consistency.) is the only full-length studio album by the American emo band Cap'n Jazz. It was released in 1995 on the record label Man With Gun. Cap'n Jazz's lineup at the time of recording comprised Tim Kinsella on lead vocals, Davey von Bohlen and Victor Villarreal on guitar, Sam Zurick on bass guitar, and Mike Kinsella on drums.

The band formed in Buffalo Grove, Illinois, where the members had met as teenagers at Wheeling High School. Influenced by the Midwestern punk scene, the band developed an idiosyncratic sound characterized by enigmatic wordplay, chaotic guitar melodies, and vocals presented in a naïve art style, with Tim alternating between spoken word, singing, and shouting.

Cap'n Jazz broke up shortly after the album's release due to Villarreal suffering a non-lethal drug overdose during a tour. The album eventually went out of print for many years as the band members pursued other musical endeavors. When many of the band members' new projects gained attention in subsequent years, the success of their bands helped the album obtain a cult following.

Shmap'n Shmazz is regarded as a foundational album of Midwest emo and a milestone in the genre, helping emo become a more widely accepted subset of indie rock. All of the album tracks were re-released on the band's anthology album Analphabetapolothology, and Cap'n Jazz reunited in 2010 and 2017 to perform tracks from the album.

== Background and production ==
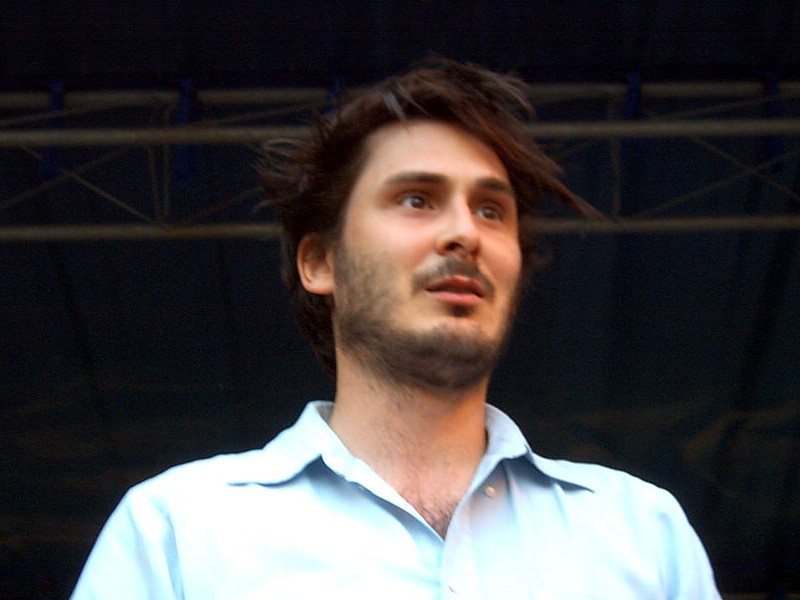
Tim Kinsella (pictured, 2006) was the frontman for Cap'n Jazz and formed the band during his high school years.

In 1989, Tim Kinsella met Sam Zurick on the first day of high school and became friends due to their mutual taste in music. Tim later met Victor Villarreal while skateboarding at Wheeling High School. Villarreal introduced Tim to his band, Toe Jam. Toe Jam contained two other members at the time: Jim, a neighbor of Villarreal, and Jeff, the high school's football star running back. Tim joined the band as a guitarist, Zurick joined as a "roadie", and Tim's younger brother, Mike, joined as a rhythm guitarist. Despite these initial collaborations, the songs produced by the original lineup of Toe Jam failed to captivate Tim and Mike, who found the music "mundane".

Jim and Jeff later quit the band. After their departure, the remaining band members overhauled the band; Zurick started playing bass guitar, while Mike started playing drums after being gifted a drum kit by his mother. The band chose the name "Cap'n Jazz" after Zurick blurted the name while eating the cereal Cap'n Crunch with the band. The band started touring and recording multiple extended plays. Davey von Bohlen, from Milwaukee, joined the band as a second guitarist, having previously played in the band Ten Boy Summer. In 1994, Mark Corley, the owner of the record label Man With Gun, persuaded Tim to record a full-length album for the label.

The band recorded the album at Idful Music Corporation, owned by Brad Wood, while Casey Rice produced the album. While recording for vocals, little thought was put into structure, which Tim said hindered his relearning of the lyrics. Pitchfork's Ian Cohen noted the vocal structure as the band focused on "shout first, process later". The band recorded the album during the final five days of 1994.

== Composition and lyrics ==
Cap'n Jazz - Little League
A 24-second sample clip of the second verse in Little League, the opening track in the album. Tim equivocally describes a "Ringwald haze" and bruises.

Musically, the album is described as "frantic," and has been categorized as math rock, post-hardcore, and emo with its subgenre Midwest emo. However, Tim believed it was more of a different type of punk at the time, claiming it was "weirdo punk". Tim's cousin Nate Kinsella said the uniqueness of the songs made him assume that Tim "was a manic". Theo Katsaounis, a future drummer for the band Joan of Arc where Tim was the frontman, also noted that he would "freak out" with a French horn on live sessions. AllMusic's Steve Huey describes the band as shifting from emo's musical focus on post-hardcore and post-punk to a more art punk style.

When Cap'n Jazz was happening, we didn't ever [think] of ourselves as an emo band. Maybe they all called this "emo band" but I thought we were like "weirdo punk band". I never felt connected to [the emo] scene. It was also like jockish, you know?

— Tim Kinsella

Tim wrote most of the album's lyrics and recorded his vocals with a naïve art style and amateur singing, becoming the band's focal point. Critics described Tim's lyrics as cryptic and surrealist. Tim claimed that most of the lyrics were written when he took psilocybin mushrooms for the first time. Pitchfork's Ian Cohen has said that, despite the enigmatic lyrics and "incomprehensible guitar interplay", it still expressed the same ideas as other influential emo bands like Rites of Spring or Sunny Day Real Estate. Bob Nanna, who played in the emo band Braid, is credited on the song "Yes, I Am Talking to You" for the line "I'm dying to tell you I'm dying". The band also credited Ryan Rapsys for the track "Precious" and Kevin J. Frank for "¡Qué Suerté!".

== Release ==
The album was released in 1995 through Man With Gun Records. To promote the album, the band embarked on a tour. However, at the time, Zurick and Villarreal were addicted to drugs to the point where both of them thought Tim was straight-edge since he did not "[show] up to school on acid every day". Mike commented on the band's attempts to intervene on the problem, particularly about Villarreal, but no successful attempt was made.

After playing a show in the first week of the tour in Little Rock, Arkansas, Villarreal was seen by the other band members urinating all over himself and other equipment. Band members described the moment as terrifying due to his eyes being "rolled back", his body being "jitterily", and Villarreal being uncommunicative. The band transported Villarreal to an emergency room, where they were informed that Villarreal suffered an overdose caused by Ritalin.

Villarreal was released to the band members the morning after, although still unconscious. The band members were conflicted on the course of action the band should take. Von Bohlen and Tim advocated for canceling upcoming tour dates and continuing with the tour, while Mike and Zurick insisted on disbanding. Ultimately, Cap'n Jazz disbanded, leading to the end of the tour as the band members returned home. Each member pursued other musical endeavors following the dissolution. Von Bohlen formed The Promise Ring, Mike attended the University of Illinois Urbana-Champaign and formed American Football there, Tim formed Joan of Arc, and Villarreal and Zurick created Ghosts and Vodka.

== Reception and legacy ==
Due to the band breaking up shortly after the release, the album received minimal attention from publications. The band reissued their album, including their extended plays, appearances in compilation albums, and unreleased content on their anthology album on Jade Tree titled Analphabetapolothology in 1998. This was due to many fans contacting the band members about how they could find the album during their concerts with other bands. Jason Ankeny of AllMusic called the reissue "excellent". Nick Mirov of Pitchfork called it the "Holy Grail to the post-emo indie-rock world". Mirov further praised Tim's vocals for his rapid-fire delivery of lyrics, describing the album as a "messy glory". Folk singer Devendra Banhart described Cap'n Jazz as inspiring in his career due to how Tim attempts to be Arthur Rimbaud and compared Tim's vocals to "going to the zoo on quaaludes, but all the other animals are on speed".

Shmap'n Shmazz is considered to be a significant influence on the Midwest emo scene. NME listed the album as one of "20 Emo Albums That Have Resolutely Stood The Test of Time". In Rolling Stone's list of the 40 greatest emo albums of all time, the album came in 7th, with Suzy Exposito writing that the album was "a significant blueprint for dozens of emo and post-hardcore acts to follow". The opening track, "Little League", appeared 3rd on a best-of emo songs list by Vulture, describing the song as "like a teenager's bedroom — a seemingly incoherent mess that, upon closer inspection, reveals the most intimate secrets". Several bands and artists have cited Shmap'n Shmazz and Cap'n Jazz as influences on their music, including Algernon Cadwallader, Ryley Walker, and The Get Up Kids.

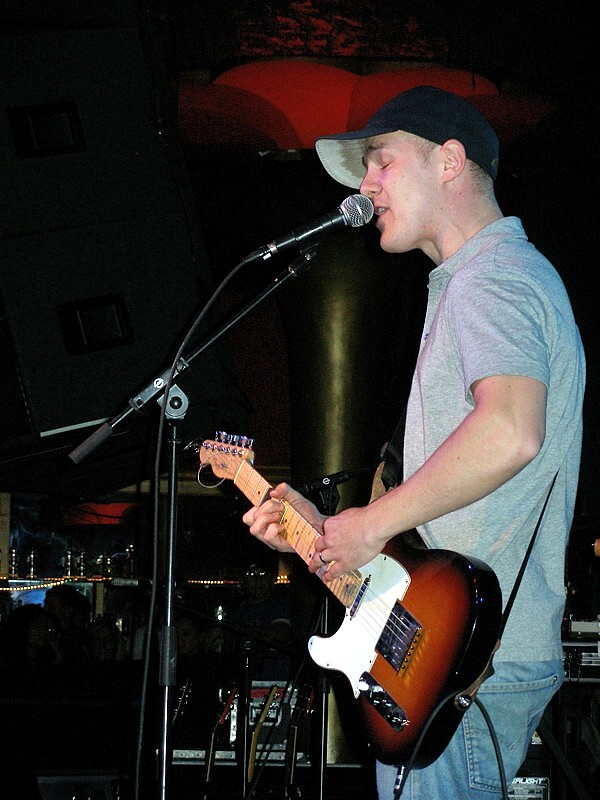
Band member Davey von Bohlen (pictured) initially said that he had "regret and contempt for the entire Cap'n Jazz experience". Despite this statement, he joined back on a reunion tour in 2010.

Many of the band members reflected positively on the record. Villarreal claimed that the music they recorded was therapeutic and allowed him to release his emotions. However, band member von Bohlen was rather dismissive about the album after its release. He cited only "regret and contempt" for the recording in an attempt by the Phoenix New Times for an interview in 1997. When Phoenix New Times interviewed Tim about Cap'n Jazz, he said that von Bohlen might hold some contempt due to him having to commute an hour and a half for practice, his appearance in the band being short, and von Bohlen not getting along with Villarreal. Von Bohlen specifically said that the commute was the main issue. He stated that when his car died, he was "Greyhound-bussing it to Chicago after work" and wanted to join another band. Cap'n Jazz reunited for multiple tours, but although present during Cap'n Jazz's 2010 reunion, von Bohlen was notably absent from the 2017 reunion due to scheduling conflicts, with both it and the 2025 reunion having Tim and Mike's cousin Nate fill in for von Bohlen.

Shmap'n Shmazz has been reissued by Polyvinyl, first on cassette in 2018 and then on vinyl in 2025.

== Track listing ==
All lyrics are written by Tim Kinsella; all music is composed by Cap'n Jazz (T. Kinsella, Davey von Bohlen, Victor Villarreal, Sam Zurick, and Mike Kinsella; all songs produced by Casey Rice.

Shmap'n Shmazz track listing
No.	Title	Lyrics	Length
1.	"Little League"		3:57
2.	"Oh Messy Life"		2:03
3.	"Puddle Splashers"		2:07
4.	"Flashpoint: Catheter"		3:21
5.	"In The Clear"		1:58
6.	"Yes, I Am Talking To You"	T. Kinsella; Bob Nanna	2:32
7.	"Basil's Kite"		2:36
8.	"Bluegrassish"		1:08
9.	Untitled		3:00
10.	"The Sands Have Turned Purple"		2:45
11.	"Precious"	Ryan Rapsys; T. Kinsella	2:39
12.	"¡Qué Suerté!"	T. Kinsella; Kevin J. Frank	3:02
Total length:			31:10

== Personnel ==
The album's personnel are found in its booklet.

- Tim Kinsella – lead vocals (credited for "belts")
- Davey von Bohlen – guitar, backing vocals
- Victor Villarreal – guitar
- Sam Zurick – bass
- Mike Kinsella – drums

Additional personnel

- Anja Westerweck – backing vocals (on track 1, credited for "kitty, kitty cats")
- Casey Rice – tambourine (on tracks 1, 3), recording, mixing
- Kevin J. Frank – piano (on track 8), songwriting (on track 12)
- Ryan Rapsys - songwriting (on track 11)
- Bob Nanna - songwriting (on track 6, credited for the line "I'm dying to tell you I'm dying")
