= 1984 (Joan of Arc album) =

Studio album by Joan of Arc
- Released: June 2, 2018
- Genre: Indie rock
- Length: 35:20
- Label: Joyful Noise Recordings
- Producer: Nate Kinsella

Joan of Arc chronology
He's Got the Whole This Land Is Your Land in His Hands (2017)	1984 (2018)

Professional ratings
Aggregate scores
Source	Rating
Metacritic	70/100
Review scores
Source	Rating
AllMusic	3/5 stars
Drowned In Sound	8/10
The Line of Best Fit	5.5/10
The Skinny	4/5 stars
Spin	8/10

1984 is the twenty-third studio album by Joan of Arc released in 2018 on Joyful Noise Recordings. The album was announced on April 4 for release on June 1. It is the second album featuring the JOA line-up that debuted on He's Got The Whole This Land Is Your Land In His Hands, consisting of Tim Kinsella, Theo Katsaounis, Melina Ausikaitis, Bobby Burg, and Jeremy Boyle.

On this album, Tim Kinsella (usually the band's lead vocalist) steps aside as front-man, building the album around Melina Ausikaitis's vocal tracks.

“We were thinking of it as a [late period] Black Flag record, where Melina would sing a song, then the next song was a jam,” said Kinsella, describing the structure and sequencing of the material appearing on the album. The album was produced by lead-singer Tim Kinsella's cousin, long-time collaborator and frequent bandmate Nate Kinsella (aka Birthmark).

In honor of the album's release, Joyful Noise Recordings produced a version of George Orwell's dystopian novel of the same name, 1984, that substituted the names of the Joan of Arc band members for all of the major characters (Winston Smith -> Tim Kinsella, O'Brien -> Bobby Burg, etc.) and set the story in Chicago (instead of London), posting the revision on 1984.com for a limited time.

== Track listing ==
1. "Tiny Baby" - 4:29
2. "Vertigo" - 2:59
3. "Punk Kid" - 5:27
4. "Maine Guy" - 5:20
5. "People Pleaser" - 3:13
6. "Psy-Fi/Fantasy" – 2:38
7. "Truck" - 5:23
8. "Vermont Girl" - 4:06
9. "Forever Jung" - 1:49
