= Rollo Tomasi =

American post-hardcore band

- Origin: Chicago, Illinois, U.S.
- Genres: Post-hardcore
- Years active: 1999-present
- Labels: Divot; Underground Communique; Shakefork
- Members: Neil Sandler; Jeff Larsen; James Staffel; Brad Bischoff
- Past members: Neil Keener; Craig Olson; Joe Partyka; Pete Croke; Matt Fast; Chris Insidioso; Chris LaFrombois
- Website: www.rollotomasi.com

Rollo Tomasi is an American post-hardcore band from Chicago, Illinois.

== Band history ==
Rollo Tomasi formed in October 1999 by Neil Sandler, Craig Olson, and Neil Keener after Olson and Sandler's previous band Traluma had disbanded. Sometimes compared to bands like Helmet and The Jesus Lizard, as well as Sandler's previous bands, Traluma and Gauge, Rollo Tomasi blend tight rhythms and aggression with a healthy nod to the early, post hardcore bands of the mid-90s DC scene.

Their name was taken from the film L.A. Confidential, in which a police officer creates a fictional character, Rollo Tomasi, to personify all the bad guys who think “they can get away with it".

In November 2011, James Staffel of Yakuza replaced original drummer Craig Olson. In October 2013, bass player Jeff Larsen took over second guitar duties from the departing guitarist Matt Fast, and Chris LaFrombois (formerly of the Reptoids) joined the band on bass. Since the fall of 2016, Brad Bischoff has been the bass player.

Members of Rollo Tomasi have been in other notable bands, including The Sky Corvair, Gauge, Yakuza, Planes Mistaken for Stars, Brokeback, Hanalei, and Treaty of Paris.

== Discography ==
=== Albums ===
- The Fear Is Unsafe (Shakefork Records, 2019)
- Coward (Shakefork Records, 2010)
- Work Slow Crush Foes (Underground Communique Records, 2005)
- He Who Holds You (Divot Records, 2001)

=== Compilation appearances ===
- For Kenna Rae (Shakefork Records, 2011)
- The World I Know - A Tribute to Pegboy (Underground Communique, 2006)
- Live on WLUW 88.7 FM (2004)
- Salute - A Tribute to the Fallen and the Survivors of September (Paper Crane Records, 2001)

== Band members ==
Current Members
- Neil Sandler – Vocals, Guitar (1999–present)
- Jeff Larsen – Guitar, Vocals (2013–present), Bass (2007–2013)
- Brad Bischoff – Bass (2016–present)
- James Staffel – Drums (2011–present)
Former Members
- Neil Keener – Bass (1999–2000)
- Chris LaFrombois – Bass (2013–2016)
- Craig Olson – Drums (1999–2002, 2006–2011)
- Joe Partyka – Bass (2000–2002)
- Pete Croke – Bass, Vocals (2002–2007)
- Matt Fast – Guitar (2002–2013)
- Chris Insidioso – Drums (2002–2006)
