= Rapšys =

Rapšys is a Lithuanian surname. Notable people with the surname include:

- Danas Rapšys (born 1995), Lithuanian swimmer
- Ryan Rapsys (fl. 1991–2010), American post-hardcore music band member
