= Life Like (Joan of Arc album) =

Studio album by Joan of Arc
- Released: 10 May 2011
- Genre: Indie rock
- Label: Polyvinyl

Joan of Arc chronology
Flowers (2009)	Life Like (2011)	He's Got the Whole This Land Is Your Land in His Hands (2017)

Professional ratings
Review scores
Source	Rating
Allmusic	Life Like at AllMusic
Rockfeedback	4/5 stars

Life Like is the fourteenth full-length studio album by Joan of Arc released in 2011 on Polyvinyl Records. It is also the first Joan of Arc album to feature former Cap'n Jazz guitarist, Victor Villarreal. It was produced by Steve Albini.

== Track listing ==
1. "I Saw the Messed Binds of My Generation" - 10:43
2. "Love Life" - 3:03
3. "Like Minded" - 5:07
4. "Life Force" - 1:13
5. "Night Life Style" - 3:55
6. "Howdy Pardoner" - 4:10
7. "Still Life" - 4:36
8. "Deep State" - 5:18
9. "After Life" - 2:47
