= In the clear =

In the clear may refer to:

- Plaintext, unencrypted information
- "In the Clear", a song by Foo Fighters from Sonic Highways
- In the Clear, an album by Ivy
- "In the Clear", a song by Cap'n Jazz from Shmap'n Shmazz
