= Victor Villareal =

Victor Villarreal may refer to:

- Victor Villareal, American boxer defeated by Marcos Reyes in September 2010
- Victor Villarreal, American guitarist and songwriter
