= Live in Chicago, 1999 =

Studio album by Joan of Arc
- Released: May 25, 1999
- Studio: Classsicks
- Genre: Emo; experimental rock; post-rock
- Length: 50:17
- Label: Jade Tree
- Producer: Casey Rice

Joan of Arc chronology
| How Memory Works (1998) | Live in Chicago, 1999 (1999) | The Gap (2000) |

Professional ratings
Review scores
| Source | Rating |
|---|---|
| AllMusic | 2.5/5 stars |
| Pitchfork | 1.9/10 |

Live in Chicago, 1999 is the third studio album by Joan of Arc, released in 1999. It is not an album of live material, but is rather named after the fact that the band members lived in Chicago in the year 1999.

== Production ==
Live in Chicago, 1999 was recorded mainly at Classsicks, with some recording being done at Truckstop West and Sherry and Lenora's house. Casey Rice served as producer and handled recording, while additional recording was done by Elliot Dicks on half of the songs. Scott Adamson did additional recording and editing on tracks 1 and 6. Rice mixed the recordings, before the album was mastered by Alan Douches at West West Side Music in New Jersey.

== Critical reception ==
The Chicago Tribune wrote that the album is "full of the kind of music that requires headphones to be completely appreciated, sound collages that envelop the listener in their arty, dreamy textures." Washington City Paper thought that "these are overcast songs of lovelorn gloom: tone poems that spread out, rumble a bit, but mostly just loom over the listener in one big gray mood." Spin wrote that it "goes beyond emo to a freestyle, experimental, randomly discordant place."

== Track listing ==
All songs by Joan of Arc, except "Thanks for Chicago, Mr. James" by Scott Walker.

1. "It's Easier to Drink on an Empty Stomach Than Eat on a Broken Heart" – 4:58
2. "Who's Afraid of Elizabeth Taylor?" – 6:28
3. "If It Feels / Good, Do It" – 5:04
4. "Live in Chicago, 1999" – 2:11
5. "(I'm 5 Senses) None of Them Common" – 3:48
6. "Me (Plural)" – 5:03
7. "I'm Certainly Not Pleased with My Options for the Future" – 0:36
8. "When the Parish School Dismisses and the Children Running Sing" – 3:51
9. "Thanks for Chicago, Mr. James" – 2:24
10. "(In Fact I'm) Pioneering New Emotions" – 2:58
11. "Better De'd Than Read" – 3:15
12. "Sympathy for the Rolling Stones" – 6:34
13. "All Until the Greens Reveal Themselves at Dawn" – 3:09

== Personnel ==
Personnel per booklet.

Joan of Arc

- Jeremy Boyle – guitar
- Tim Kinsella – vocals, guitar
- Todd Mattel – guitar

Additional musicians

- Scott Adamson – drums (tracks 1 and 4)
- Bob Akai – drums (tracks 2, 3 and 8)
- Nathaniel Braddock – trumpet (track 3)
- Kevin J. Frank – piano (track 9), organ (track 10)
- Mike Kinsella – drums (track 5)
- Noel Kupersmith – bass (tracks 2 and 8)
- Ryan Rapsys – drums (tracks 6 and 10)
- Chris Warland – saxophone (track 3)
- Jen Wood – vocals (track 6)
- Casey Rice – programming

Production and design

- Casey Rice – recording, mixing, producer
- Elliot Dicks – additional recording (tracks 1, 4–6, 9, 10 and 13)
- Scott Adamson – additional recording (tracks 1 and 6), editing (tracks 1 and 6)
- Alan Douches – mastering
- Joan of Arc – set design, construction, art direction
- Andy Mueller – photography, art direction
- Edgar Bryan – renaissance portrait replication
- Jason Gnewikow – art direction
