= A Portable Model Of =

Studio album by Joan of Arc
- Released: June 6, 1997
- Recorded: December 1996 – March 1997
- Studio: Elliot's Loft; Idful, Chicago, Illinois
- Genre: Emo
- Length: 41:18
- Label: Jade Tree

Joan of Arc chronology
A Portable Model Of (1997)	How Memory Works (1998)

Professional ratings
Review scores
Source	Rating
AllMusic	3/5 stars

A Portable Model of is the first full-length studio album by Joan of Arc, released in June 1997 on Jade Tree Records.

== Background ==
Joan of Arc descended from the influential emo band Cap'n Jazz. In a 2017 interview, frontman Tim Kinsella remarked "When the first Joan of Arc record came out [1997’s A Portable Model Of ] all the emo people hated us. While we were in Cap’n Jazz, we were like, ‘Man, these emo bands fucking suck! What is this bullshit?’ We just couldn't relate. Joan of Arc started as a self-conscious distancing from what we had been associated with. It's very weird now that those early Joan of Arc records historically get included as part of that movement."

A Portable Model Of was recorded between December 1996 and March 1997; sessions were split between Elliot's Loft and Idful Music. At the former, Elliot Dicks and the band recorded and mixed half of the album, while Casey Rice recorded and mixed the remainder. D Singer did editing at Dance Hall Classikx, before the album was mastered by Alan Douches at West West Side Music in New Jersey.

== Reception ==
Blake Butler of AllMusic gave A Portable Model Of three stars, claiming that it "consists mainly of interesting and calm instrumentation, odd sounds and effects, and the sometimes heavenly, sometimes over-the-edge vocals of Tim Kinsella." He goes on to write "Most people will either fall in love immediately with this album, or find it hideous."

In 2017, Vice included the album as part of their "1997: The Year Emo Broke" series of retrospective articles. They state "The album opens with "I Love a Woman (Who Loves Me)," a simple acoustronic track that sets the tone for what Kinsella and company try to accomplish throughout the album—sparse yet intersecting guitar work with the occasional electronic programming, coupled with analytical yet earnest lyrics. The relaxed pace and toned-down fervor was a divergence from Cap'n Jazz's blunt approach, but instead of forging an entirely new beginning, A Portable Model Of... played like an enlightened version of Cap'n Jazz."

== Track listing ==
All music by Joan of Arc, all words by Tim Kinsella.

1. "I Love a Woman (Who Loves Me)" – 1:59
2. "The Hands" – 2:44
3. "Anne Aviary" – 5:24
4. "Let's Wrestle" – 2:41
5. "Romulans!Romulans!" – 1:28
6. "Post Coitus Rock" – 3:20
7. "Count to a Thousand" – 8:15
8. "How Wheeling Feels" – 4:08
9. "In Pompeii" – 1:37
10. "Caliban" – 3:05
11. "In Pamplona" – 1:52
12. "I Was Born" – 1:08
13. "(I Love a Woman) Who Loves Me" – 3:37

== Personnel ==
Personnel per booklet.

Joan of Arc

- Eric Bocek – guitar
- Jeremy Boyle – guitar
- Tim Kinsella – vocals, guitar, drums
- Sam Zurick – bass guitar

Additional musicians

- Mike Kinsella – guitar (tracks 4 and 10), drums (tracks 2, 3 and 10)
- Ann-Marie Rounkle – vocals (track 2)
- Ryan Rapsys – drums (tracks 6, 8 and 12)
- Jay Gabarck – guitar (track 3)
- Davey von Bohlen – vocals (track 6)
- Nathaniel Braddock – Effectron (track 7)
- Azita Youssefi – "Explain water to the Fish"

Production and design

- Elliot Dicks – recording (tracks 1, 5, 7 and 9–11), mixing (tracks 1, 5, 7 and 9–11)
- Joan of Arc – recording (tracks 1, 5, 7 and 9–11), mixing (tracks 1, 5, 7 and 9–11)
- Casey Rice – recording (tracks 2–4, 6, 8, 12 and 13), mixing (tracks 2–4, 6, 8, 12 and 13)
- D Singer – editing
- Alan Douches – mastering
- Ann-Marie Rounkle – band photo
- Jeremy Boyle – illustration
- Jason Gnewikow – art direction, design
