= Eventually, All at Once =

Studio album by Joan of Arc
- Released: July 25, 2006
- Genre: Indie rock
- Length: 36:47
- Label: Record Label Record Label
- Producer: Bobby Burg

Joan of Arc chronology
The Intelligent Design Of... (2006)	Eventually, All at Once (2006)	Boo! Human (2008)

Professional ratings
Review scores
Source	Rating
Allmusic	link

Eventually, All at Once is the tenth studio album by Joan of Arc, released in 2006 on Record Label Record Label. It was recorded at the home of Donna Kinsella in Buffalo Grove, IL. It is, according to a 2018 interview, Tim Kinsella's least favorite Joan of Arc album.

== Recording ==
According to frontman Tim Kinsella, the album was recorded in his mother's house, with the control room being his brother Mike Kinsella's former room and the live room being Tim's former room.

According to Tim Kinsella, Eventually, All at Once was informed by the Velvet Underground's 1969 eponymous album. Kinsella has described the album as "one of our million attempts to make that Velvet Underground record, where we're just sitting on the couch with acoustic guitars, but you have to be really good to pull that off, and I guess we couldn't."

== Track listing ==
1. Eventually, All At Once - 3:19
2. I'm Calling Off All Falls from Grace - 3:07
3. Miss Cat Piss and Peppermint - 3:14
4. You Can't Change Your Mind - 2:59
5. Living Out in the Sea of Umbrellas - 3:46
6. Many Times I've Mistaken - 3:57
7. Words Have Cast Their Spells - 4:03
8. If All These People Can Understand Money - 2:52
9. Scratches a Pencil - 5:02
10. Free Will and Testament - 3:41
