= How Memory Works =

Studio album by Joan of Arc
- Released: May 12, 1998
- Recorded: October 1997 – February 1998
- Studio: Electrical Audio, Elliot's Loft, Truckstop
- Genre: Indie rock
- Length: 38:04
- Label: Jade Tree

Joan of Arc chronology
A Portable Model Of (1997)	How Memory Works (1998)	Live in Chicago, 1999 (1999)

Professional ratings
Review scores
Source	Rating
AllMusic	4/5 stars
Pitchfork Media	4.6/10
Sputnikmusic	4/5

How Memory Works is the second full-length album by the American band Joan of Arc. It was released in 1998 on Jade Tree Records. The artwork of the album suggests that it is something of a companion to the debut album, A Portable Model Of...: the booklets for both records contain the phrase "a portable model of... how memory works."

== Production ==
Sessions for How Memory Works were held between October 1997 and February 1998. Nearly half of the album was recorded and mixed by Casey Rice at Electrical Audio, with assistance from Rob Bochnik and Greg Norman. The remaining songs were recorded and mixed by Elliot Dicks, Jeremy Boyle and Tim Kinsella at Elliot's Loft and Truckstop. Rice sequencing the album, while Alan Douches mastered it at West West Side Music in New Jersey.

== Critical reception ==
The Village Voice wrote: "Tempos and volumes rise and fall unexpectedly, as [Tim] Kinsella's squirrelly guitar and voice register a whole gawky wonderama of awkward silences with surprising nerd authority for someone still shy of 25."

== Track listing ==
All songs written by Joan of Arc.

1. "Honestly Now" – 0:48
2. "Gin & Platonic" – 3:32
3. "To've Had Two Of" – 3:07
4. "This Life Cumulative" – 3:41
5. "A Pale Orange" – 6:47
6. "White Out" – 3:50
7. "So Open; Hooray!" – 4:23
8. "A Name" – 3:08
9. "Osmosis Doesn't Work" – 3:33
10. "God Bless America" – 2:22
11. "A Party Able Model Of" – 2:52

== Personnel ==
Personnel per booklet.

Joan of Arc

- Eric Bocek – guitar
- Jeremy Boyle – guitar
- Tim Kinsella – vocals, guitar
- Mike Kinsella – drums
- Sam Zurick – bass guitar

Additional musicians

- Marty Ackley – musical saw (track 9)
- Zach Fiocca – vibraphone (track 3)
- Julie Pomerleau – violin (tracks 3 and 11), viola (tracks 3 and 11)
- Griffin Rodriquez – cello (track 3)

Production and design

- Casey Rice – recording (tracks 2–4, 6, 8 and 10), mixing (tracks 2–4, 6, 8 and 10), sequencing
- Rob Bochnik – assistance
- Greg Norman – assistance
- Elliot Dicks – recording (tracks 1, 3, 5, 7, 9 and 11), mixing (tracks 1, 3, 5, 7, 9 and 11)
- Jeremy Boyle – recording (tracks 1, 3, 5, 7, 9 and 11), mixing (tracks 1, 3, 5, 7, 9 and 11), cover painting
- Tim Kinsella – recording (tracks 1, 3, 5, 7, 9 and 11), mixing (tracks 1, 3, 5, 7, 9 and 11)
- Alan Douches – mastering
- Jason Gnewikow – photography, art direction, design
