= Joan of Arc, Dick Cheney, Mark Twain =

Studio album by Joan of Arc
- Released: August 24, 2004
- Genre: Indie rock
- Length: 57:17
- Label: Polyvinyl
- Producer: Nate Kinsella

Joan of Arc chronology
Live In Muenster, 2003 (2004)	Joan of Arc, Dick Cheney, Mark Twain (2004)	Presents Guitar Duets (2005)

Professional ratings
Aggregate scores
Source	Rating
Metacritic	70/100
Review scores
Source	Rating
AllMusic	link

Joan of Arc, Dick Cheney, Mark Twain is the seventh full-length album by Joan of Arc, released in 2004. It is their first for Polyvinyl Records. It is, according to a 2018 interview, Tim Kinsella's favorite Joan of Arc album.

== Track listing ==
1. Questioning Benjamin Franklin's Ghost - 3:17
2. Apocalypse Politics - 2:22
3. The Title Track of This Album - 1:19
4. Queasy Lynn - 2:36
5. White and Wrong - 3:26
6. Onomatopoepic Animal Faces - 4:20
7. A Half-Deaf Girl Named Echo - 5:32
8. 80's Dance Parties Most Of All - 1:49
9. Deep Rush - 1:56
10. Gripped By The Lips - 4:15
11. Fleshy Jeffrey - 4:12
12. Abigail, Cops and Animals - 4:33
13. "Still" From Miss Kate's Texture Dictionary 2:25
14. The Details of the Bomb - 4:17
15. I Trust a Litter of Kittens Still Keeps the Colosseum - 6:20
16. The Telephones Have Begun Making Calls - 3:29
17. The Cash In and Price - 1:09
