= Life Like =

Life Like may refer to:

- Life-Like, a manufacturer of model railroad products
- Life-like cellular automata, which are similar to Conway's Game of Life
- Life Like (Joan of Arc album), 2011
- Life Like (The Rosebuds album), 2008
- "Lifelike", a 2018 song by Antarctigo Vespucci on the album Love in the Time of E-Mail
- "Lifelike", a 2021 song by Porter Robinson on the album Nurture
- Life Like (film), a 2019 sci-fi movie

== See also ==
- Like Life, a Japanese visual novel
