= Lies (band) =

American indie rock band

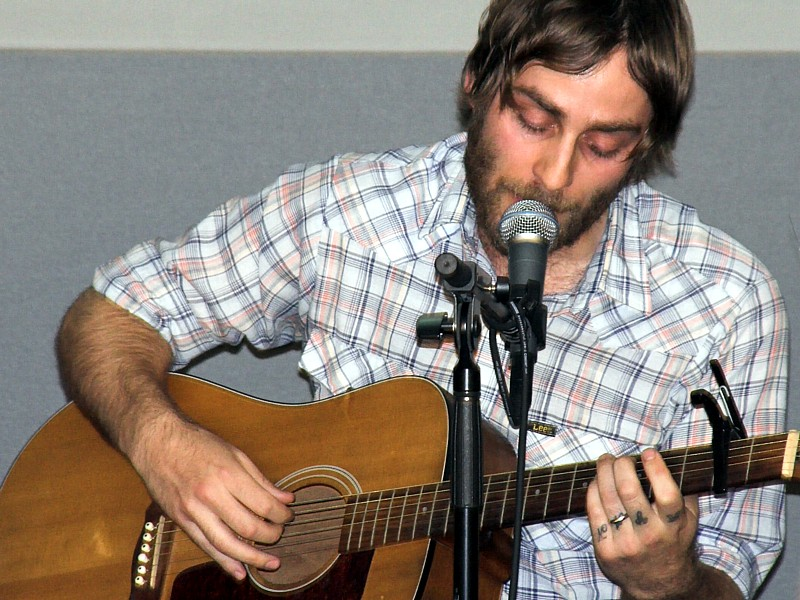
Mike Kinsella performing in 2007

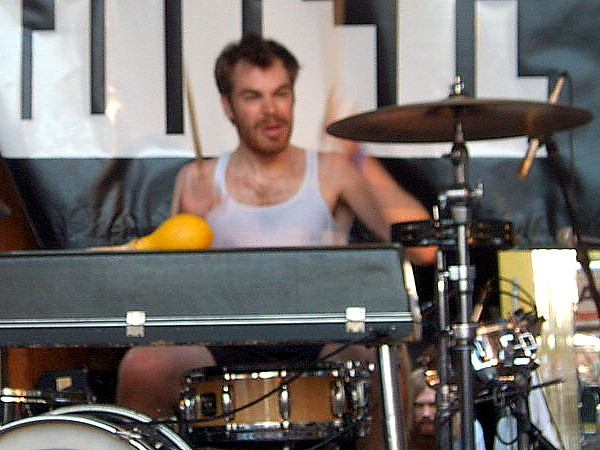
Nate Kinsella performing in 2006

Lies is an American indie rock band consisting of Mike and Nate Kinsella.

== History ==
In May 2022, cousins Mike and Nate Kinsella announced they had started a new musical project, releasing two new songs, "Blemishes" and "Echoes", under the name Lies. Three months later, the duo returned with another new song, "Summer Somewhere". In September 2021, Lies shared their fourth song, "Corbeau". Lies' fifth song, "Camera Chimera", was released in November 2022. The duo announced their debut, self-titled album in February 2023, and released it on March 31.

== Discography ==
- Lies (2023)
