= Nate Kinsella =

American musician (born 1980)

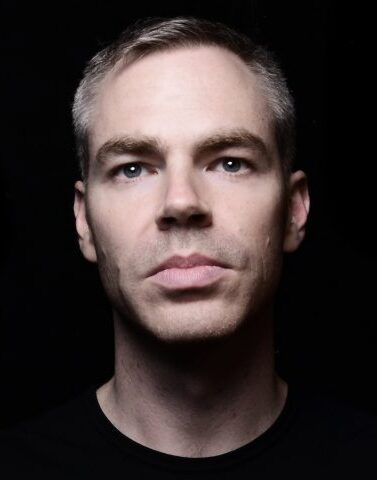
- Kinsella in 2015

Background information
- Born: March 19, 1980 (age 46)
- Genres: Musician; producer
- Instruments: Drums; guitar; bass; vocals; keyboards; percussion
- Years active: 1990–present
- Label: Polyvinyl
- Member of: Birthmark; American Football; Lies
- Formerly of: Joan of Arc; Make Believe

Nate Kinsella (born March 19, 1980) is an American multi-instrumentalist, composer, sound engineer, and producer. He performs solo as Birthmark and in a number of other projects, many with one or both of his cousins, Mike and Tim Kinsella. These include former bands Joan of Arc and Make Believe as well as ongoing projects American Football and Lies.

== Discography ==
=== as Birthmark ===
- The Layer (2007)
- Shaking Hands (2010)
- Antibodies (2012)
- How You Look When You're Falling Down (2015)
- Birth of Omni (2024)

=== Collaborations ===
- Lies, Lies (2023)

=== As performer ===
- Joan of Arc, Rabbit Rabbit split 7" (2003)
- Make Believe, Make Believe (2004)
- Make Believe, The Pink 7" (2004)
- Joan of Arc, Live In Muenster, 2003 (2004)
- Joan of Arc, Bundini Brown split 12" (2004)
- Joan of Arc, Joan of Arc, Dick Cheney, Mark Twain (2004)
- Owen, I Do Perceive (2004)
- Make Believe, Shock of Being (2005)
- Joan of Arc, Joan of Arc Presents: Guitar Duets (2005)
- Tim Kinsella, Crucifix Swastika (2005)
- Make Believe, Of Course (2006)
- Joan of Arc, The Intelligent Design Of... (2006)
- The Love of Everything, Superior Mold and Die (2006)
- Joan of Arc, Eventually, All at Once (2006)
- Joan of Arc, Orchard Vale (2007)
- Chris Connelly, The Episodes (2007)
- Make Believe, Going to the Bone Church (2008)
- Chris Connelly, Forgiveness & Exile (2008)
- Owen, New Leaves (2009)
- Joan of Arc, Oh Brother (2011)
- Joan of Arc, The Joan of Arc Lightbox Orchestra Conducted by Fred Lonberg-Holm (2011)
- Make Believe, Can't Tell Cop from Cap (2012)
- Tim Kasher, Adult Film (2013)
- American Football, American Football (2016)
- American Football American Football (2019)
- American Football American Football (2026)

=== As producer & engineer ===
- Owen, At Home with Owen (2006): engineer, mixing
- Owen, New Leaves (2009): engineer
- Owen, Ghost Town (2011): engineer
- Oh, Yuck, So Much Light (2017): arrangements
- Joan of Arc, 1984 (2018): producer
- TTNG, Animals Acoustic (2018): engineer, arrangements
- Joan of Arc, Tim Melina Theo Bobby (2020): mixing
- Aitis Band, Aitis Band III (2022): producer
