= Gauge (band) =

Post-hardcore band from Chicago

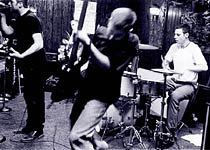
- Gauge performs live at the Moose Lodge in Mt. Prospect, IL on December 30, 1993

Background information
- Origin: Chicago, Illinois, United States
- Genres: Post-hardcore, Midwest emo
- Years active: 1991–1994, 2009–present
- Labels: Actionboy; Permanent Satan; Radius; Shakefork; THD; Tree; Underdog
- Members: Scott "Gub" Conway; Kevin J. Frank; Neil Sandler; Ryan Rapsys
- Website: www.gaugechicago.com

Gauge is an American post-hardcore band from the northwest suburbs of Chicago, Illinois.

== History ==
Gauge formed at the beginning of 1991. Members had previously been in the bands Ivy League and Target. Highly regarded in Chicago's northwest suburban punk scene, Gauge inspired and performed with other bands from the same area such as Cap'n Jazz, Friction, and Braid. Gauge released their first full-length, Soothe, by the end of 1992. After releasing their second album in 1994, entitled Fire Tongue Burning Stomach, they announced their break up. A posthumous 10" was released in 1995, making the band's final recordings available.

During their career, Gauge played 150 shows. Their final show was on October 6, 1994, at The Moose Lodge in Mount Prospect, IL with Cap'n Jazz and Tetsuo.

Members of Gauge went on to perform in the bands Sky Corvair, Euphone, 5ive Style, Sweater Weather, Haymarket Riot, Traluma, Radio Flyer, Heroic Doses, Ambulette and Rollo Tomasi, as well as working with Joan Of Arc, Owls and Noyes.

Kevin J. Frank contributed vocals to the songs, "Geheim" and "Sergio Valente", which are tracks 12 and 13 on disc 2 of the Cap'n Jazz anthology album, Analphabetapolothology. These songs also appear on the Cap'n Jazz 7", Boys 16 to 18 Years... Age of Action (Further Beyond Records, 1993).

On December 8, 2009, it was announced Gauge will play live for the first time since 1994 on March 6, 2010, at the Bottom Lounge in Chicago, Illinois.

Following the 2010 reunion shows, a documentary/tribute/concert film entitled "GAUGE:153" was shot and edited by filmmaker Matt Golin. The film features 9 live songs from their 2010 reunion shows intercut with historical footage of the band and interviews with members of Cap'n Jazz, Braid, and Sidekick Kato among others.

== Discography ==
=== Gauge Releases ===
Title	Year	Label	Details
Demo	1991	Self Released	6 song tape (300 made)
Gauge (self titled free record)	1991	A Ray Kolenko Release	2 song 7" (100 pressed), given away free by Ray Kolenko at a show at Sir Donald's in Downer's Grove, IL.
Blank	1992	Shakefork Records	4 song 7" (700 pressed)
Soothe	1992	THD/Radius	11 song LP/CD (1100 LP & 1500 CD made)
Swing	1993	Underdog Records	2 song 7" (1500 pressed)
Fire Tongue Burning Stomach	1994	Underdog Records	10/12 song LP/CD (1000 LP & 1000 CD made)
43	1995	Actionboy	6 song 10"
I	2000	Tree Records	23 song CD (First half of Gauge discography)
Mints	2010	Shakefork Records	2 song 7" includes a download code for 2 additional tracks. Given away with entry to Gauge's March 6, 2010 reunion show at the Bottom Lounge in Chicago.
II	2010	Shakefork Records	21 song digital download (Second half of Gauge discography)

=== Compilations ===
- Split 7" w/ Grout Villa (Permanent Satan, 1992)
- Achtung Chicago! Zwei! (Underdog Records, 1993)
- It's A Punk Thing, You Wouldn't Understand (Shakefork Records, 1993)
- A Very Punk Christmas (The Rocco Empire & Further Beyond Records, 1993)
