= Boo! Human =

Studio album by Joan of Arc
- Released: May 20, 2008
- Genre: Indie rock
- Label: Polyvinyl

Joan of Arc chronology
Eventually, All at Once (2006)	Boo! Human (2008)	Flowers (2009)

Professional ratings
Aggregate scores
Source	Rating
Metacritic	71/100
Review scores
Source	Rating
AllMusic	4/5 stars
Tiny Mix Tapes	3.5/5 stars

Boo! Human is an album by Joan of Arc, released in 2008 on Polyvinyl Records. In May and June 2008, the band promoted it with a cross-country US tour with 31Knots. A music video was released for "A Tell-Tale Penis" on August 8, 2008, directed by Christopher Perkowitz-Colvard.

== Track listing ==
1. "Shown and Told" – 3:22
2. "Laughter Reflected Back" – 2:44
3. "Just Pack or Unpack" – 5:09
4. "9/11 2" – 1:19
5. "A Tell-Tale Penis" – 3:50
6. "Everywhere I Go Everyone I Know Laughs and Says I Told You So" – 1:23
7. "Vine on a Wire" – 4:57
8. "Insects Don't Eat Bananas" – 1:50
9. "Lying and Cheating and Chasing You Around" – 0:25
10. "If There Was a Time #1" – 3:29
11. "The Surrender #1" – 3:14
12. "If There Was a Time #2" – 3:57
13. "The Surrender #2" – 4:50
14. "So-and-So" – 3:12
