= 13.0.0.0.0 =

Studio album by This Town Needs Guns
- Released: January 22, 2013 (UK)
- Genre: Indie rock, math rock
- Length: 40:42
- Label: Sargent House
- Producer: Ed Rose, This Town Needs Guns

This Town Needs Guns chronology
Animals (2008)	13.0.0.0.0 (2013)	Disappointment Island (2016)

Professional ratings
Review scores
Source	Rating
Consequence of Sound	3/5 stars
Sputnikmusic	4/5 stars

13.0.0.0.0 is the second studio album by British math rock band This Town Needs Guns, released 22 January 2013, on Sargent House. This is the band's first album with new vocalist Henry Tremain, and last release with bassist Jamie Cooper. Before its official release, the tracks "Cat Fantastic", "Left Aligned" and "I'll Take The Minute Snake" were available on Sargent House's SoundCloud account. The album's title refers to the Maya Calendar.

== Track listing ==
1. "Cat Fantastic" - 4:53
2. "Havoc in the Forum" - 3:36
3. "Left Aligned" - 3:24
4. "In The Branches of Yggdrasil" - 2:00
5. "I'll Take the Minute Snake" - 5:54
6. "2 Birds, 1 Stone And An Empty Stomach" - 4:10
7. "Nice Riff, Clichard" - 2:06
8. "Triptych" - 3:07
9. "Pygmy Polygamy" - 1:42
10. "A Different Kind of Tall (small)" - 4:15
11. "+3 Awesomeness Repels Water" - 4:25
12. "13.0.0.0.1" - 1:06
13. "Vibe Check" (Japan Bonus Track) - 2:40

== Personnel ==
- Henry Tremain - lead vocals, guitar
- Jamie Cooper - bass
- Tim Collis - guitar
- Chris Collis - drums, percussion
