= He's Got the Whole This Land Is Your Land in His Hands =

Studio album by Joan of Arc
- Released: January 17, 2017
- Genres: Experimental rock; indie rock; art rock; post-rock; drone
- Length: 39:29
- Label: Joyful Noise
- Producers: Joan of Arc; Mike Lust

Joan of Arc chronology
Testimonium Songs (2013)	He's Got the Whole This Land Is Your Land in His Hands (2017)	1984 (2018)

Singles from He's Got the Whole This Land Is Your Land in His Hands
- 1. "This Must Be the Placenta" Released: October 5, 2016; 2. "Stranged That Egg Yolk" Released: November 17, 2016; 3. "Full Moon And Rainbo Repair" Released: December 8, 2016; 4. "Two-Toothed Troll" Released: January 4, 2017

He's Got the Whole This Land Is Your Land in His Hands is the twenty-second full-length album of American indie rock band Joan of Arc. It is the first album by the band to include guitarist and vocalist Melina Ausikaitis as part of the lineup. The LP is a set of eleven tracks assembled from nine hours' worth of jam session recordings. Despite following a more restrained of the band's chaotic, unconventional style, He's Got the Whole This Land Is Your Land in His Hands still garnered mixed responses from reviewers for said style's lack of accessibility to listeners. The album peaked number 26 and five on Billboard's American Independent Albums and Heatseekers Albums charts, respectively.

== Production ==
In making the album, Joan of Arc first tried to plan out the songs, but the group was unable to come up with anything "interesting" with that method. They realized the only way they could make interesting songs was through hours-long jam sessions, but they didn't have the budget to record them in a studio. Thus, using a mobile recording device, the group recorded in several "weird spaces", such as a basketball court of a hotel, an Airbnb service, and an industrial space in West Side, Chicago. As Tim Kinsella described the sessions, "We hit Record and played, and our collective tastes emerged. And they, our tastes in the moment, were the only standards in all the expanse of the stupefying and beautiful unknown universe, that we regarded as relevant in the least." The group recorded nine hours of material that was later edited into 23 tracks. Finally, "the best 10 or 12 songs didn't end up on the record, it was the best sequence of stuff," explained Kinsella.

== Composition ==
Drew Fortune categorized He's Got the Whole This Land Is Your Land in His Hands as was would happen "if the Butthole Surfers recorded a post-rock record". Some critics found the LP to be a more relaxed take on the band's otherwise chaotic and bizarre style than their previous releases, being more atmospheric and melodic than the band's previous LPs. As per usual for the band's music, the lyrical content, in the words of Fortune, "straddles the line between surrealist poet and agitator". Some reviewers noted constant tonal shifts in the lyrics, which go from "daft-but-harmless" to "lines that leave a bitter taste in the mouth", summarized Drowned in Sound. The lyrics have very obscure meanings, but some critics suggested the album, based on the lyrics, sound, and its title (a combination of the names of "He's Got the Whole World in His Hands" and "This Land is Your Land"), was about staying calm in a time of dissolution in a society. He's Got the Whole This Land Is Your Land in His Hands is the first Joan of Arc album with Melina Ausikaitis in its lineup, who "often plays the role of the band's Flavor Flav, throwing in punchlines during Kinsella's verses and backing him up in makeshift choruses," writer David Anthony summarized.

== Critical reception ==
Professional ratings
Aggregate scores
Source	Rating
Metacritic	60/100
Review scores
Source	Rating
AllMusic	3/5 stars
The A.V. Club	C–
Drowned in Sound	6/10
Exclaim!	7/10
Magnet	7.5/10 stars
Pitchfork	3.8/10
PopMatters	8/10 stars
Spectrum Culture	3/5 stars
State	3/5 stars
Under the Radar	5/10 stars

Like with past Joan of Arc records, reviews for He's Got the Whole This Land Is Your Land in His Hands were mixed in general primarily due to the lack of accessibility of its experimental style. In a favorable review, Ian King of PopMatters claimed that with He's Got The Whole, "patience, and collaboration continue to focus and invigorate Joan of Arc." He also wrote that it was "impressive that Kinsella's hyperactive imagination has relented so little." Noting the LP's chaotic style to be more "relaxed" than previous albums by the group, Exclaim! labeled it "a minor gem in the Joan of Arc discography, as Kinsella gives listeners more simply by pulling back."

Under the Radar called it "a slow-grower, worth applying oneself too", reasoning that when it is "stripped of the discord and uncomfortable shock-factor references, the melodic interchanges can be extremely pleasant and directional. Joan of Arc knows how to build with an emotive goal, and He's Got the Whole This Land Is Your Land In His Hands has moments where it gives the weird a glorious grounding and juxtaposition." An AllMusic critic stated that He's Got the Whole "may alienate even some of Kinsella's more patient and open-eared fans, as it sometimes wanders into a slow ramble over repetitive dissonance," but "its impulsive quality may be irresistible to a punkier sensibility, offering catharsis in its deliberate lack of polish and self-censorship." Anthony opined that He's Got the Whole did deserve respect for staying committed to an experimental style, but "it's often so obtuse it feels like it's not meant for anyone but its creators." Evan Rytlewski of Pitchfork, however, dismissed the album as a "troll manifesto" and described it as Kinsella's most "irritating" record due to its "off-putting" humor of the lyrics and its tuneless sound: "He's Got the Whole is presented as good fun, but it's only fun in a one-sided, "why are you hitting yourself?" sort of way."

== Track listing ==
Derived from the iTunes Store.

No.	Title	Length
1.	"Smooshed That Cocoon"	2:53
2.	"This Must Be the Placenta"	3:40
3.	"Stranged That Egg Yolk"	4:38
4.	"Full Moon and Rainbo Repair"	4:46
5.	"Cha Cha Cha Chakra"	2:46
6.	"Grange Hex Stream"	3:47
7.	"Two-Toothed Troll"	3:39
8.	"New Wave Hippies"	2:52
9.	"Never Wintersbone You"	2:38
10.	"F Is for Fake"	3:50
11.	"Ta-ta Terrordome"	4:00
Total length:		39:29

== Personnel ==
Derived from the album's liner notes.

- Written, edited, and assembled by Joan of Arc (Bobby Burg, Jeremy Boyle, Melina Ausikaitis, Theo Katsaounis, and Tim Kinsella)
- Recorded and mixed by Mike Lust
- Technical support by Neil Strauch
- Mastered by Carl Saff
- Cover art/layout by David Woodruff

== Charts ==
Chart (2017)	Peak position
US Heatseekers Albums (Billboard)	5
US Independent Albums (Billboard)	26

== Release history ==
Region	Date	Format(s)	Label
Worldwide	January 17, 2017	Streaming	Joyful Noise
Worldwide	January 20, 2017	CD; digital download; vinyl	Joyful Noise
