= Underground Communique Records =

Underground Communique Records is an American independent record label based in Chicago, Illinois. Launched in late December 2003, the label includes punk rock, indie rock, and ska bands. By February 2011, the label had issued more than 50 releases.

== History ==
Justin Schwier started Underground Communique after the Chicago band Mexican Cheerleader asked him to release one of its records. Shot Baker helped promote the label during its early years, and Schwier cited Harmless Records and Johann's Face Records as local influences. Initially focused on Chicago bands, the label later worked with bands from elsewhere in the United States.

In 2010, Underground Communique joined Asbestos Records and the Ska Is Dead tour on the subscription-based Ska Is Dead 7-inch of the Month Club. The label released Apocalypse Hoboken's 17-track collection Everybody's Been Burned in 2018, and in 2019 it co-released Sub Dio's self-titled debut EP with Side With Us Records.

== Artists ==
- Apocalypse Hoboken
- Big D and the Kids Table
- Edna's Goldfish
- 88 Fingers Louie
- Four Star Alarm
- Mexican Cheerleader
- Rollo Tomasi
- Shot Baker
- The Copyrights
- The Honor System
- The Methadones
- The Pietasters
- The Toasters
