= Analphabetapolothology =

Compilation album by Cap'n Jazz
- Released: January 8, 1998
- Genre: Midwest emo; post-hardcore; math rock; art punk
- Length: 99:21
- Label: Jade Tree Records

Cap'n Jazz chronology
Shmap'n Shmazz (1995)	Analphabetapolothology (1998)

Analphabetapolothology is an anthology compilation album by Cap'n Jazz released in 1998 on Jade Tree Records. It catalogues almost every song recorded and released by the band during their time together except an early song called "Naive."

The album consists of the band's first and only full length studio album along with songs from EPs, compilation tracks, live recordings, and previously unreleased outtakes and demos.

According to singer Tim Kinsella, the title for the compilation was originally supposed to be "Anthroalphabetapoloanthology": "I thought of the name and then drove to Madison [Wisconsin] where Jason [Gnewikow, of the Promise Ring and graphic design firm The Collection Agency] lived, and I just typed it in. We were doing the layout and I was like, yeah, I guess that's the name, but I got home after the whole thing was laid out, and weeks later I realized I named it wrong. It was already printed."

It's pronounced "an alphabet apolo(tholo)gy."

Professional ratings
Review scores
Source	Rating
Allmusic	link
Pitchfork Media	(8.5/10) link
Punknews.org	link
UpbeetMusic	link

== Track listing ==
Disc 1
No.	Title	Originally from	Length
1.	"Little League"	Shmap'n Shmazz (1995)	3:57
2.	"Oh Messy Life"	Shmap'n Shmazz (1995)	2:03
3.	"Puddle Splashers"	Shmap'n Shmazz (1995)	2:03
4.	"Flashpoint: Catheter"	Shmap'n Shmazz (1995)	3:25
5.	"In the Clear"	Shmap'n Shmazz (1995)	1:57
6.	"Yes, I Am Talking to You"	Shmap'n Shmazz (1995)	2:36
7.	"Basil's Kite"	Shmap'n Shmazz (1995)	2:36
8.	"Bluegrassish"	Shmap'n Shmazz (1995)	1:08
9.	"Planet Shhh"	Shmap'n Shmazz (1995)	2:59
10.	"The Sands Have Turned Purple"	Shmap'n Shmazz (1995)	2:46
11.	"Precious"	Shmap'n Shmazz (1995)	2:44
12.	"¡Qué Suerté!"	Shmap'n Shmazz (1995)	3:05
13.	"Take On Me" (a-ha cover)	Previously unreleased	3:03
14.	"Tokyo"	Previously unreleased	3:59
15.	"Ooh Do I Love You"	Previously unreleased	2:41
16.	"Hey Ma, Do I Hafta Choke on These"	We’ve Lost Beauty (1995)	2:09
17.	"Forget Who We Are" (live)	Previously unreleased, from the band's final show	2:46
18.	"Olerud" (live)	Previously unreleased, from the band's final show	3:28

Disc 2
No.	Title	Originally from	Length
1.	"We Are Scientists!"	Sometimes if you stand further away from something, it does not seem as big. Sometimes you can stand so close to something you can not tell what you are looking at. (1993)	3:14
2.	"Sea Tea"	Sometimes if you stand further away from something, it does not seem as big. Sometimes you can stand so close to something you can not tell what you are looking at. (1993)	2:32
3.	"Troubled by Insects"	Sometimes if you stand further away from something, it does not seem as big. Sometimes you can stand so close to something you can not tell what you are looking at. (1993)	3:58
4.	"Rocky Rococo"	Nothing Dies with Blue Skies (1993)	4:22
5.	"In the Clear"	How the Midwest Was Won (1993)	2:14
6.	"Soria"	Picking More Daisies (1993)	2:17
7.	"No Use for a Piano Player When You Got a Player Piano"	How the Midwest Was Won (1993)	1:38
8.	"Scary Kids Scaring Kids"	It’s a Punk Thing, You Wouldn't Understand (1993)	4:49
9.	"Bluegrass"	Ghost Dance (1993)	4:12
10.	"Winter Wonderland"	A Very Punk Christmas (1993)	1:45
11.	"AOK"	Boys 16 to 18 Years... Age of Action (1993)	3:02
12.	"Geheim"	Boys 16 to 18 Years... Age of Action (1993)	2:41
13.	"Sergio Valente"	Boys 16 to 18 Years... Age of Action (1993)	3:29
14.	"Easy Driver"	Boys 16 to 18 Years... Age of Action (1993)	3:20
15.	"Theme to '90210'"	Punk TV (1995)	2:18
16.	"Ooh Do I Love You" (acoustic)	Ooh Do I Love You (1995)	4:05
