= Animals (This Town Needs Guns album) =

Studio album by TTNG
- Released: 13 October 2008 (UK)
- Recorded: The Lodge Studios, Northampton
- Genres: Indie rock, math rock, emo
- Length: 43:35
- Labels: Big Scary Monsters, Sargent House
- Producer: Max Read

TTNG chronology
This Town Needs Guns (2008)	Animals (2008)	13.0.0.0.0 (2013)

Animals is the debut album by Oxford-based math rock band TTNG. It had its UK release on 13 October 2008, under BSM Records, and on 10 March 2009 in the US, via Sargent House Records. It was recorded over the periods of March through May on a four weekend basis due to financial and personal demands. It was all recorded at the Lodge Studios in Northampton

Every song on the album continues the same theme of being named after different types of animals. During the writing and recording phase, the band named each song with temporary names in order to avoid calling them formal titles, such as "New Track 1", etc. So, they settled with names of animals as a fleeting substitute for the song names, hoping to change them before release. However, the band eventually couldn't decide on official names to replace them with, so the titles remained as they were.

There has been a promotional video made for "Panda", which was aired on the band's website and record label's YouTube page on 3 September 2008.

The album has been listed on the UK iTunes, but the track listing is incorrect; the songs have been listed alphabetically.

An acoustic remake called Animals Acoustic was released on 3 October 2018 to celebrate the album's tenth anniversary. TTNG brought Stuart Smith back to perform the vocals, as well as joining the band for the Animals 10th Anniversary Tour, where the band performed the entirety of Animals at each performance.

== Track listing ==
Professional ratings
Review scores
Source	Rating
AbsolutePunk	(80%)
Sputnikmusic	4/5 stars

1. "Chinchilla" – 4:22
2. "Baboon" – 3:26
3. "Lemur" – 3:09
4. "Badger" – 4:53
5. "Quetzal" – 0:35
6. "Panda" – 3:25
7. "Elk" – 3:46
8. "Pig" – 3:46
9. "Gibbon" – 4:27
10. "Dog" – 2:52
11. "Crocodile" – 2:31
12. "Rabbit" – 4:43
13. "Zebra" – 1:50

== US track listing ==
1. "Pig" - 3:48
2. "Baboon" - 3:26
3. "Panda" - 3:27
4. "Gibbon" - 4:26
5. "Rabbit" - 4:45
6. "Badger" - 4:53
7. "Elk" - 3:51
8. "Crocodile" - 2:31
9. "Quetzel" - 0:37
10. "Chinchilla" - 4:27
11. "Dog" - 2:55
12. "Lemur" - 3:11
13. "Zebra" - 2:08
14. "If I Sit Still, Maybe I'll Get Out Of Here (Bonus Track)" - 6:04
15. "26 Is Dancier Than 4 (Bonus Track)" - 4:48

== Personnel ==
- Stuart Smith - lead vocals; guitar (only on US bonus tracks)
- Tim Collis - guitar
- Dan Adams - bass, trumpet
- Chris Collis - drums, percussion
- Jody Prewett - piano, guitar (only on US bonus tracks)
