= So Much Staying Alive and Lovelessness =

Studio album by Joan of Arc
- Released: February 4, 2003
- Genre: Indie rock
- Length: 46:43
- Label: Jade Tree
- Producer: Graeme Gibson, Califone

Joan of Arc chronology
How Can Any Thing So Little Be Any More? EP (2001)	So Much Staying Alive and Lovelessness (2003)	In Rape Fantasy and Terror Sex We Trust (2003)

Professional ratings
Aggregate scores
Source	Rating
Metacritic	75/100
Review scores
Source	Rating
Allmusic	4/5 stars
Philadelphia Inquirer	4/5 stars

So Much Staying Alive and Lovelessness is the fifth full-length album by Joan of Arc, released in 2003 by Jade Tree Records. Initially envisioned as a double-album, tracks recorded during the same sessions as So Much... were instead released as In Rape Fantasy and Terror Sex We Trust later that year.

== Track listing ==
1. On A Bedsheet In The Breeze On The Roof - 6:17
2. The Infinite Blessed Yes - 4:27
3. Perfect Need And Perfect Completion - 5:35
4. Olivia Lost - 5:16
5. Diane Cool And Beautiful - 3:43
6. Mr. Participation Billy - 2:20
7. Mean To March - 4:48
8. Hello Goodnight Good Morning Goodbye - 2:45
9. Dead Together - 4:08
10. Madelleine Laughing - 4:14
11. Staying Alive And Lovelessness - 3:08
