= In Rape Fantasy and Terror Sex We Trust =

Studio album by Joan of Arc
- Released: February 4, 2003
- Genre: Indie rock
- Length: 46:43
- Label: Perishable Records
- Producer: Graeme Gibson

Joan of Arc chronology
So Much Staying Alive and Lovelessness (2003)	In Rape Fantasy and Terror Sex We Trust (2003)	Live in Muenster, 2003 (2004)

Professional ratings
Aggregate scores
Source	Rating
Metacritic	63/100
Review scores
Source	Rating
Allmusic	4/5 stars

In Rape Fantasy and Terror Sex We Trust is the sixth full-length album by Joan of Arc, released in 2003 on Perishable Records. The songs were recorded in the same sessions as So Much Staying Alive and Lovelessness, and the album is thought to be something of a companion album to that record. The title track was created as an attempt by Tim Kinsella to capture the effect Bauhaus' The Sky's Gone Out had on him "when he was 10yrs old and accidentally bought it before he was ready to hear it". This is one of the few Joan of Arc albums not to receive a vinyl release.

== Track listing ==
1. Sing the Scarecrow Song - 3:29
2. Happy 1984 and 2001 - 6:17
3. Excitement is Exciting - 3:13
4. Barge - 5:08
5. Gang Language - 4:24
6. Moonlighting - 3:33
7. Dinosaur Constellations Part 1 - 1:54
8. Them Brainwash Days - 3:17
9. Dinosaur Constellations Part 2 - 2:46
10. No Corporate News is Good News - 2:47
11. That Radiant Morning - 1:38
12. Them Heartache Nights - 0:46
13. Dinosaur Constellations Part 3 - 0:37
14. In Rape Fantasy and Terror Sex We Trust - 8:34
