= Flowers (Joan of Arc album) =

Studio album by Joan of Arc
- Released: June 9, 2009
- Genre: Indie rock
- Label: Polyvinyl

Joan of Arc chronology
Boo! Human (2008)	Flowers (2009)	Life Like (2011)

Professional ratings
Aggregate scores
Source	Rating
Metacritic	61/100 link
Review scores
Source	Rating
Allmusic	link

Flowers is the twelfth studio album by Joan of Arc released in 2009 on Polyvinyl Records. The album was announced on March 13 for release on June 9. In addition, the album's track listing and artwork were revealed.

== Track listing ==
1. Fogbow - 4:07
2. The Garden of Cartoon Exclamations - 5:05
3. Flowers - 6:38
4. Fasting - 2:10
5. Explain Yourselves #2
6. Tsunshine - 6:04
7. A Delicious Herbal Laxative - 2:15
8. Explain Yourselves - 4:11
9. Table of the Laments - 2:28
10. Fable of the Elements - 2:12
11. Life Sentence / Twisted Ladder - 4:18
12. The Sun Rose - 1:24
