= Presents Guitar Duets =

Studio album by Joan of Arc
- Released: July 26, 2005
- Genre: Indie rock
- Length: 50:26
- Label: Record Label Record Label

Joan of Arc chronology
Joan of Arc, Dick Cheney, Mark Twain (2004)	Presents Guitar Duets (2005)	The Intelligent Design Of... (2005)

Joan of Arc Presents: Guitar Duets is the eighth full-length album by Joan of Arc, released in 2005. The album consists of ten guitar duets, each featuring 2 past members of Joan of Arc, paired up by pulling names out of a hat. On the album cover, the tracks are identified by pictures of the guitarists playing on them.

== Track listing ==
1. Bobby Burg / Nate Kinsella - 2:22
2. Matt Clark / Bobby Burg - 4:53
3. Todd Mattei / Matt Clark - 4:02
4. Sam Zurick / Jeremy Boyle - 7:08
5. Nate Kinsella / Ben Vida - 3:26
6. Tim Kinsella / Mike Kinsella - 2:53
7. Jeremy Boyle / Tim Rutili - 10:32
8. Todd Mattei / Tim Kinsella - 4:24
9. Tim Rutili / Sam Zurick - 7:54
10. Mike Kinsella / Ben Vida - 2:52
