= Ghosts and Vodka =

American instrumental math rock band

- Origin: Chicago, Illinois
- Genres: Math rock; instrumental rock; post-rock
- Years active: 1998–2001
- Labels: Hefty, Sixgunlover
- Spinoff of: Cap'n Jazz
- Members: Erik Bocek; Scott Shellhamer; Victor Villareal; Sam Zurick

Ghosts and Vodka was an American instrumental math rock band from Chicago, Illinois. The band was made up of two guitarists, Victor Villareal, and Sam Zurick, bassist Erik Bocek, and drummer Scott Shellhamer.

The band formed after Bocek and Zurick met Villareal and Shellhamer at a Sky Corvair reunion show in 1998. Bocek and Zurick were both members of Joan of Arc at the time, but quit when the four formed Ghosts and Vodka (Zurick would return to Joan of Arc several years later). Ghosts and Vodka continued to play until 2001, when Villareal and Zurick opted to concentrate on Owls, which saw them reuniting with their ex-Cap'n Jazz bandmates Mike and Tim Kinsella. In 2003, the Sixgunlover label compiled the group's full anthology onto one CD.

In March 2009, the band announced that they had their first practice in 8 years, but later that year announced that they were not continuing in the near future.

On March 20, 2020, pre-orders became available for the first Precious Blood LP pressing.

== Members ==
- Victor Villareal (guitars) – Formerly of Cap'n Jazz, later in Owls.
- Sam Zurick (guitars) – Formerly of Cap'n Jazz, later in Owls, Joan of Arc and Make Believe.
- Erik Bocek (bass) – Formerly of both Tetsuo and Joan of Arc.
- Scott Shellhamer (drums) – Formerly of Tetsuo, currently in American Heritage.

== Discography ==
- Memento Mori 7-inch EP (Hefty Records, 1998)
- Precious Blood CD (Sixgunlover Records, 2001)
- Addicts and Drunks CD (Sixgunlover Records, 2003)
- "Joan of Arc Presents Don't Mind Control" by V/A (Polyvinyl Records, 2010)
- Precious Blood 12-inch LP (Sixgunlover Records, 2020)
