= The Gap (Joan of Arc album) =

Studio album by Joan of Arc
- Released: October 3, 2000
- Recorded: Oct 1999 – Jun 2000
- Genre: Post-rock; experimental rock; experimental; electronic
- Length: 42:33
- Label: Jade Tree
- Producer: Casey Rice

Joan of Arc chronology
Live in Chicago, 1999 (1999)	The Gap (2000)	How Can Any Thing So Little Be Any More? EP (2001)

Professional ratings
Review scores
Source	Rating
AllMusic	1.5/5 stars
The Encyclopedia of Popular Music	2/5 stars
Pitchfork	1.9/10
Spin	8/10

The Gap is the fourth full-length album by Joan of Arc,. released on September 19, 2000 on Jade Tree Records.

== Production ==
The album was produced extensively with Pro Tools, utilizing hundreds of layers of multitrack recordings, as well as manipulation and processing.

== Critical reception ==
Exclaim! wrote: "With each album, the band pushes their craftsmanship for the obscure even further, and The Gap is a prime result of this." The Chicago Tribune deemed the album "a frustrating, daring and sometimes unlistenable entry in the band's canon." PopMatters wrote that it "may be one of the most unlistenable albums in existence."

== Track listing ==
1. (You) [I] Can Not See (You) [Me] As (I) [You] Can – 3:19
2. As Black Pants Make Cat Hairs Appear – 7:48
3. Knife Fights Every Night – 5:07
4. John Cassavetes, Assata Shakur, And Guy Debord Walk into A Bar... – 0:54
5. Another Brick at the Gap (Part 2) – 2:57
6. Zelda – 1:56
7. "Pleasure Isn't Simple" – 3:18
8. Me And America (Or) The United Colors of the Gap – 5:18
9. Your Impersonation This Morning Of Me Last Night – 9:11
10. Outside The Gap – 2:45
