= Owls (band) =

American indie rock band

- Origin: Chicago, Illinois, United States
- Genres: Indie rock; math rock; midwest emo; post-rock; punk jazz
- Years active: 2001–2002, 2012–2014
- Labels: Polyvinyl Record Co.; Jade Tree; Thick Records
- Spinoff of: Cap'n Jazz
- Members: Tim Kinsella; Mike Kinsella; Victor Villareal; Sam Zurick

Owls was an indie rock band from Chicago, Illinois. They were initially active from 2001 to 2002, reunited in 2012, and broke up again in 2014. The band was composed of the original lineup of the emo band Cap'n Jazz excluding guitarist Davey von Bohlen, who had left to form The Promise Ring. The lineup has included brothers Tim Kinsella and Mike Kinsella (vocals and drums, respectively), guitarist Victor Villareal and bassist Sam Zurick. Tim Kinsella and Zurick have also played together in Joan of Arc and Make Believe. Villarreal and Zurick played together in the instrumental rock group Ghosts and Vodka. The band signed to Jade Tree on May 3, 2001, and released their debut on July 31.

== History ==
Owls reunited in March 2012. The band announced via Facebook on July 22, 2013, that they had completed work on a new record after 18 months of writing and were heading into the studio to record their second studio album. In January it was announced that the album would be titled Two. It was released on March 25, 2014.

== Discography ==
Albums

- Owls (Jade Tree Records, 2001)
- Two (Polyvinyl, 2014)

Compilation appearances

- Oil CD (Thick Records, 2003)
