= Cap'n Jazz =

American emo band

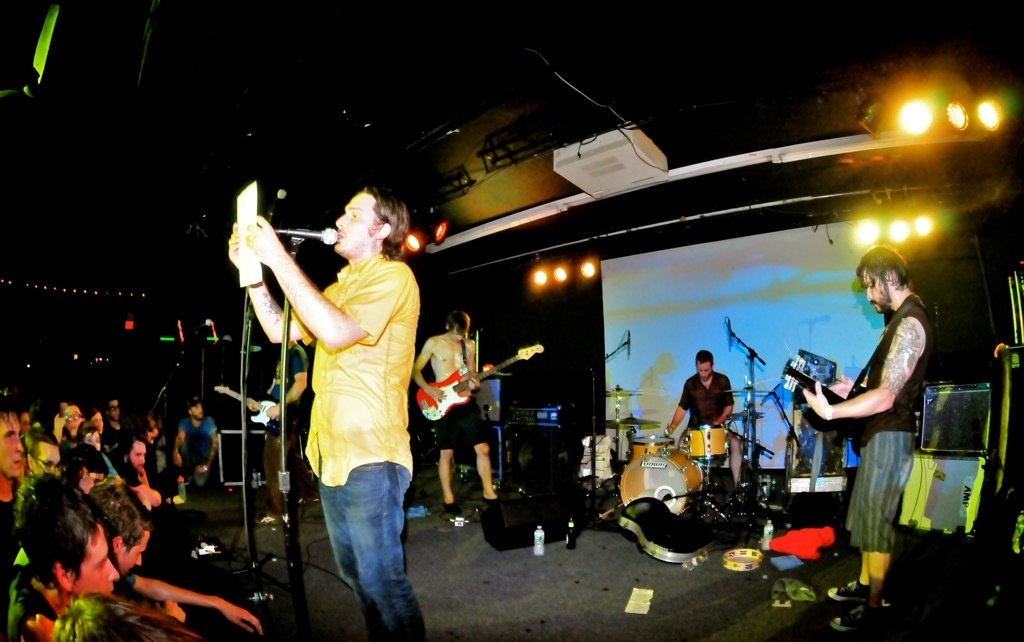
- Cap'n Jazz performing live in 2010. From left: Davey von Bohlen (obscured), Tim Kinsella, Sam Zurick, Mike Kinsella, and Victor Villarreal.

Background information
- Origin: Buffalo Grove, Illinois, U.S.
- Genres: Indie rock; midwest emo; post-hardcore
- Years active: 1989–1995; 2010; 2017; 2024–2025
- Labels: Man With Gun; Jade Tree
- Spinoffs: Joan of Arc; The Promise Ring; Owls; American Football; Ghosts and Vodka
- Members: Tim Kinsella; Mike Kinsella; Sam Zurick; Victor Villarreal
- Past members: Davey von Bohlen
- Website: https://www.capnjazz.band/

Cap'n Jazz (sometimes stylized as caP'n Jazz) was an American emo band from Buffalo Grove, Illinois.

== History ==
Brothers Tim Kinsella and Mike Kinsella formed the band Toe Jam with Victor Villarreal, and Sam Zurick, in 1989, before eventually changing the band's name to Cap'n Jazz. Cap'n Jazz recorded several singles for independent labels in the early 90s as well as contributing to several compilations.

In 1995, the band released its only full-length album, Burritos, Inspiration Point, Fork Balloon Sports, Cards in the Spokes, Automatic Biographies, Kites, Kung Fu, Trophies, Banana Peels We've Slipped On and Egg Shells We've Tippy Toed Over, on the Man with Gun label operated by Mark Pearsall. The album is sometimes referred to as Shmap'n Shmazz, which was printed on top of the CD release.

The band broke up in July 1995, shortly after Shmap'n Shmazz's release, on the night of a show at Little Rock's Das Yutes a Go-Go. In 1998, Jade Tree assembled a double-disc Cap'n Jazz retrospective titled Analphabetapolothology which compiles the band's complete recorded works (save for Naive, their song on Achtung Chicago! Zwei): Shmap'n Shmazz, early singles, material from split releases, compilation tracks, unreleased demos and outtakes and several tracks from their farewell performance in Chicago.

=== Post-breakup and reunion ===
Cap'n Jazz reunited at the Empty Bottle on Friday, January 22, 2010, as part of Joan of Arc's Don't Mind Control Variety Show. After playing a short, impromptu set in Chicago, the band played its first official reunited show at the annual Forecastle Festival in Louisville on July 10, 2010, and a hometown reunion show a week later at the Bottom Lounge, supporting the vinyl re-release of Analphabetapolothology on Jade Tree Records, where they gained success. Due to the show selling out in about 48 hours, a second show was added the next night. Later, it was announced that they would also be playing reunion shows across the United States during the summer and fall of 2010.

Cap'n Jazz was included in the lineup for the 2017 FYF Fest in Los Angeles' Exposition Park. The FYF appearance was followed by shows in San Francisco, Chicago, New York and London, including an appearance at Riot Fest 2017 in Chicago.

The band reunited again for a show at the Empty Bottle in Chicago on Sunday, October 6, 2024. The band also played Best Friends Forever Fest in Las Vegas, Nevada on October 11, 2024. They have since announced a 2025 tour with Coffin Prick to celebrate the 30th anniversary of Shmap'n Shmazz.

On November 19, 2025, Cap'n Jazz played a sold-out show at Great American Music Hall in San Francisco. "Kinsella wrote these songs as a teenager. Three decades later, the Great American Music Hall is crammed with fans young enough to pass as his children, singing along to every word... It’s the 30th anniversary of the only Cap’n Jazz album. Some algorithmic miracle has flooded the concert hall with wayward youths: The crowd is a curious mix of teens, who occupy the mosh pit, and middle-aged fans. Lip rings in the front, gauges in the back."

Former members of the band continue to play music, most notably in Make Believe, The Promise Ring, American Football, Owls, Ghosts and Vodka, Joan of Arc and Owen.

== Influences and legacy ==
Drummer Mike Kinsella has stated that Cap'n Jazz was influenced by Dischord Records acts, notably Fugazi, while frontman Tim Kinsella has said that the band also emulated fellow Illinois band Gauge. On the subject of the band members' individual and collective influences, Kinsella has stated:

All five of us were into pretty different stuff: we loved Fugazi, Jane's Addiction, Dinosaur Jr. But then there was also this tension within our tastes. I was really into the Gravity Records and the Powerviolence scene. Mike was really into Ned's Atomic Dustbin and more melodic stuff. Vic and Sam [Zurick] were really into the Shudder to Think. (...) Sometimes there'll be new bands that sound like us, so it's way different for four or five people to be like "we like Cap'n Jazz and want to sound like that" than it is for four or five people to be like "we like different things, how do we find a thing that checks all the boxes?".

Algernon Cadwallader has been noted for their sonic similarities to Cap'n Jazz, and have likewise cited the band as a primary influence.

The American post-hardcore band Scary Kids Scaring Kids took their name from a homonymous Cap'n Jazz song.

== Members ==
=== Current members ===
- Tim Kinsella – lead vocals, French horn (1989–1995, 2010, 2017, 2024–present)
- Mike Kinsella – drums (1989–1995, 2010, 2017, 2024–present)
- Victor Villarreal – guitar (1989–1995, 2010, 2017, 2024–present)
- Sam Zurick – bass guitar (1989–1995, 2010, 2017, 2024–present)

=== Past members ===
- Davey von Bohlen – guitar, backing vocals (1993–1995, 2010)

=== Touring members ===
- Nate Kinsella – guitar, backing vocals (2017, 2024–present)

== Discography ==
=== Studio album ===
- Burritos, Inspiration Point, Fork Balloon Sports, Cards in the Spokes, Automatic Biographies, Kites, Kung Fu, Trophies, Banana Peels We've Slipped On, and Egg Shells We've Tippy Toed Over (Also known as Shmap'n Shmazz) – LP/CD (Man With Gun Records, 1995)

=== Singles/EPs ===
- Boys 16 to 18 Years... Age of Action – (Further Beyond Records, 1993)
- Sometimes if you stand further away from something, it does not seem as big. Sometimes you can stand so close to something you can not tell what you are looking at. – 7” (Underdog Records, 1993)

=== Anthology ===
- Analphabetapolothology – 2xCD (Jade Tree Records, 1998), 2xLP (Jade Tree Records 2010)

=== Compilation appearances ===
- Achtung Chicago! Zwei! – compilation LP (Underdog Records, 1993)
- Nothing Dies with Blue Skies – 7” split w/ Friction (Shakefork Records, 1993)
- How the Midwest Was Won – compilation 2x7” (Subfusc Records, 1993) (Playing Field Recordings, 1993)
- Picking More Daisies – compilation 2x7” (Further Beyond Records, 1993)
- It’s a Punk Thing, You Wouldn't Understand – compilation LP (Shakefork Records, 1993)
- Ghost Dance – compilation 2x7” (Slave Cut Records, 1993)
- A Very Punk Christmas – compilation 2x7” (The Rocco Empire & Further Beyond Records, 1993)
- Punk TV – compilation LP (Red Dawg Records, 1995)
- We’ve Lost Beauty – compilation LP (File 13, 1995)
- Ooh Do I Love You – compilation 2xCD (Core For Care, 1995)
