= The Intelligent Design Of... =

Studio album by Joan of Arc
- Released: July 25, 2006
- Genre: Indie rock
- Length: 1:16:17
- Label: Polyvinyl Records

Joan of Arc chronology
Presents Guitar Duets (2005)	The Intelligent Design Of... (2006)	Eventually, All at Once (2006)

Professional ratings
Review scores
Source	Rating
Allmusic	link

The Intelligent Design Of Joan of Arc is a compilation album by Joan of Arc, released in 2006 on Polyvinyl Records.

== Track listing ==
1. Didactic Prom - 3:20
2. Please Sleep - 2:15
3. Trial At Orleans - 4:11
4. Busy Bus, Sunny Sun - 5:17
5. Stemingway and Heinbeck - 4:24
6. A Picture Postcard - 3:17
7. Forensic Economics - 4:28
8. You (Single) - 5:26
9. I'm Sorry I Got So Drunk Before My Solo Set in Tokyo - 5:30
10. My Girlfriend Dumped Me After the Free Trip to Japan - 5:35
11. Please Don't Mistake My Arrogance for Shyness - 4:07
12. For a Half-Deaf Girl Named Echo - 4:06
13. George, Oh Well (stand and clap) - 1:12
14. For the Skinheads and Hippies - 1:54
15. You Say Tornaydo and I Say Tornahdo - 2:03
16. Kissinger's Lament - 4:31
17. Violencii Or Violencum - 4:11
18. The Evidence - 6:20
19. Song For Josh - 4:09
