= Victor Villarreal =

American musician and songwriter

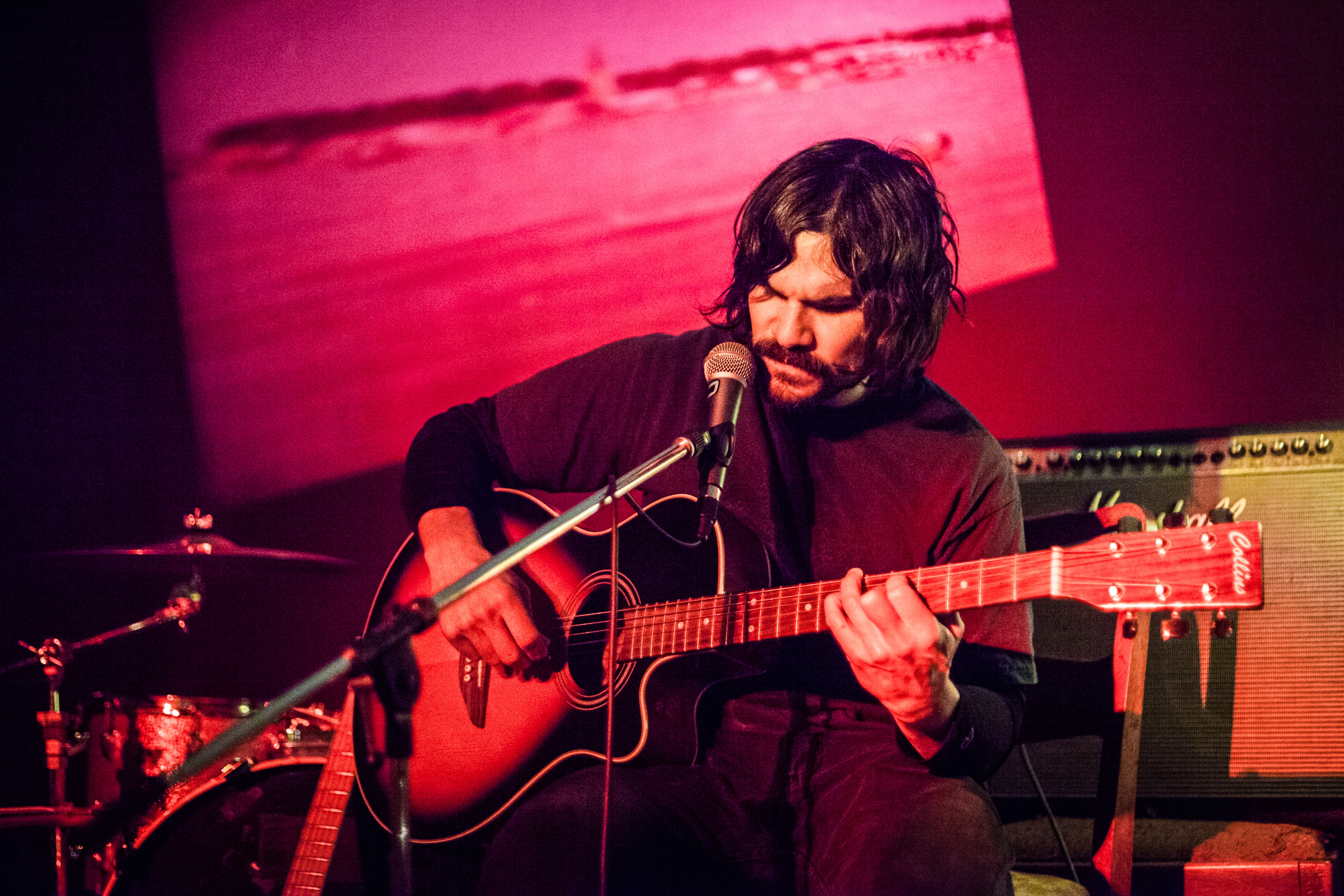
- Villarreal in 2012

Background information
- Origin: Chicago
- Genres: Indie Rock, emo
- Label: Joyful Noise Recordings

Victor Villarreal is an American musician and songwriter, best known for his role as guitarist in Cap'n Jazz, Owls and Joan of Arc. His music incorporates elements of classical, indie and emo, and contains surreal guitar solos and instrumentals.

== Biography ==
Villarreal took up the guitar at the age of 12, and played in several bands with Tim Kinsella, his childhood friend. They performed as Cap'n Jazz, Owls and Joan of Arc. Villarreal also had Joan of Arc bassist Erik Bocek perform in Villarreal's own group, Ghosts and Vodka. Having worked at a dog hospital, Villarreal later started a dog-training program called "Everything Canine." Villarreal returned to making music after his brother died, releasing the albums, "Sleep Talk" and "Invisible Cinema" through Joyful Noise Recordings in Indianapolis.

Villarreal often features cantaloupes in his music and album artwork. He has also said that he's influenced by Iron Maiden and Rush.

He married in 2024 and resides in England.

== Bands and projects ==
- 1989–1995: Cap'n Jazz
- 1996–1997: Flashlight
- 1998–2001: Ghosts and Vodka
- 2001–2002, 2012-2014: Owls
- 2003: Noyes
- 2011: Joan of Arc (band)
- 2012–present: Victor Villarreal (solo projects)

== Discography ==
- 2015: Sleep Talk – Victor Villarreal, released on Joyful Noise Recordings
- 2014: "That Familiar Band" Song / Strings Reattached - Victor Villarreal
- 2014: Two - Owls
- 2012: Joan of Arc − Joan of Arc
- 2012: Presents: Pine Cone − Joan of Arc
- 2012: The Formal Listening Series Compilation − Victor Villarreal
- 2012: Split 7" with mOck − Victor Villarreal, released on Joyful Noise Recordings
- 2012: Presents: Joan of Arc − Joan Of Arc
- 2012: Invisible Cinema − Victor Villarreal, released on Joyful Noise Recordings
- 2011: Life Like − Joan of Arc, released on Joyful Noise Recordings
- 2010: Eating Happens 7" − Victor Villarreal
- 2009: Alive − Victor Villarreal
- 2003: Addicts and Drunks − Ghosts and Vodka
- 2003: Noyes EP − Noyes
- 2003: Chicago Punk Refined Compilation − Owls
- 2001: Owls − Owls
- 2001: Precious Blood − Ghosts and Vodka
- 1999: Momento Mori EP − Ghosts and Vodka
- 1998: Analphabetapolothology − Cap'n Jazz
- 1996: Poetry Class '96 − Flashlight
