= Joan of Arc (band) =

American emo rock band

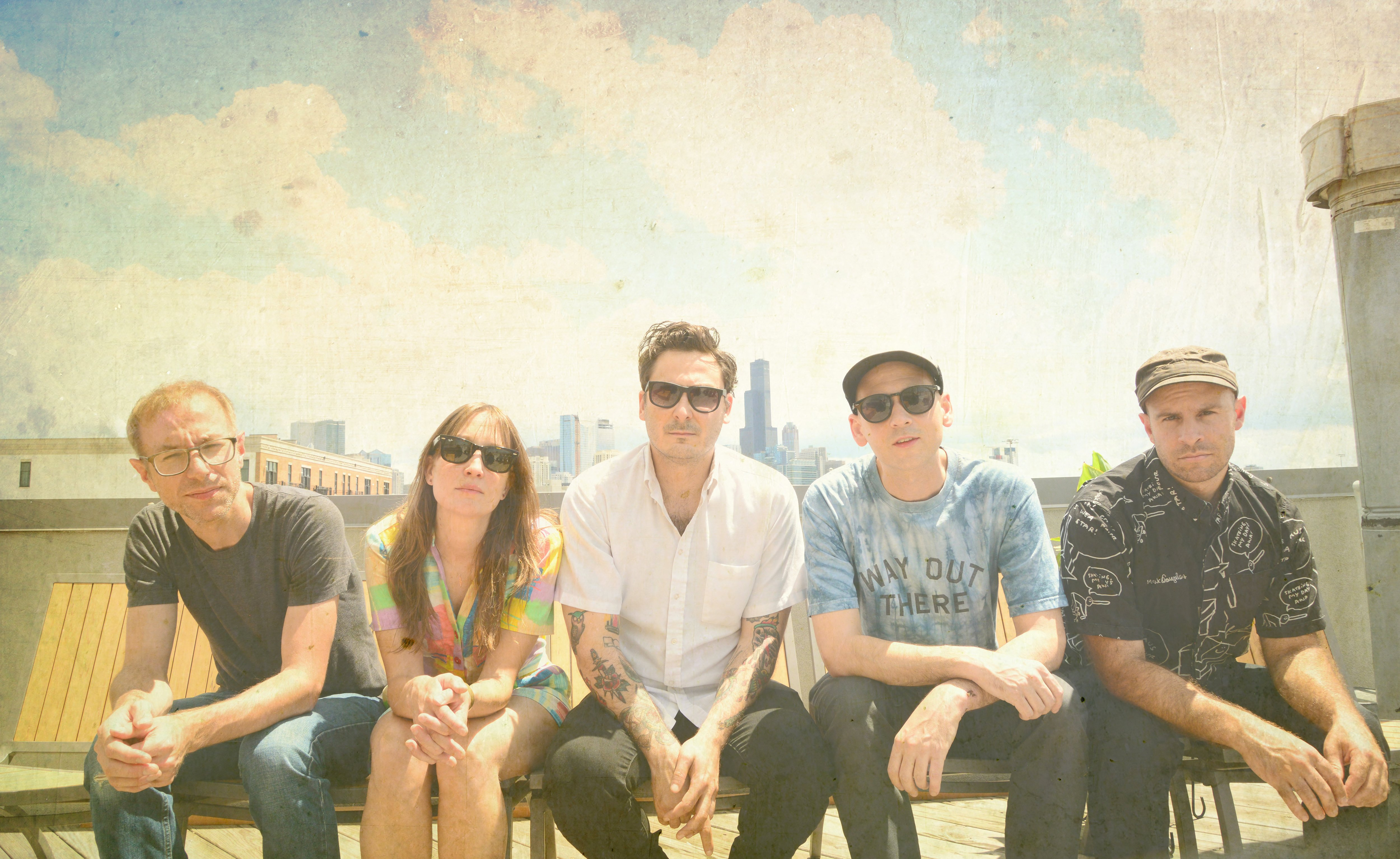
- Joan of Arc, c. 2016

Background information
- Origin: Chicago, Illinois, U.S.
- Genres: Emo; post-rock; avant-rock; indie rock; indie electronic
- Years active: 1995–2020
- Labels: Jade Tree; Record Label Record Label; Polyvinyl; Joyful Noise
- Spinoffs: Make Believe
- Spinoff of: Cap'n Jazz
- Past members: Tim Kinsella; Bobby Burg; Melina Ausikaitis; Theo Katsaounis; Sam Zurick; Mike Kinsella; Nate Kinsella; Amy Cargill; Ben Vida; Cale Parks; Matt Clark; Todd Mattei; Victor Villarreal; Erik Bocek; Jeremy Boyle
- Website: joanfrc.com

Joan of Arc was an American indie rock band from Chicago, Illinois, named after the French saint Joan of Arc. They formed in 1995, following the breakup of Cap'n Jazz. Singer Tim Kinsella was the only permanent member of the group; he has also recorded as a solo artist.

Joan of Arc are known for their use of electronics, samples, and multi-track recording in their songs; some songs on The Gap contained over 100 tracks. Joan of Arc's lyrics and cover art are often intentionally misleading, humorous, or confusing. For example, the album Live in Chicago, 1999 is not a live album, but a reference to the fact that the band lived in Chicago in the year 1999.

Members of Joan of Arc have been in many other bands including Friend/Enemy with Califone's Tim Rutili; American Football with Kinsella's brother Mike; Owls, a Cap'n Jazz reunion; Ghosts and Vodka; Everyoned, The Love of Everything, Aitis Band, Doom Flower, Hydrofoil and Make Believe.

== Biography ==
=== Formation/Jade Tree Records (1995–2003) ===
Joan of Arc began as a band named Red Blue Yellow. They broke up after their first show, threw away all of their old material, and started afresh with new songs and a new name. Three months later, Joan of Arc had their first show at Autonomous Zone in Chicago. After two promising 7" singles, the band recorded their debut album A Portable Model Of on the Jade Tree label.

A Portable Model Of introduced Joan of Arc's signature sound: a fondness for stark acoustic songs combined with subtle electronics. The debut album also included some harder material and collaborations with former Cap'n Jazz guitarist and The Promise Ring singer Davey von Bohlen and Euphone's Ryan Rapsys, who would later drum for Owls following the departure of Mike Kinsella.

In 1998, Joan of Arc released How Memory Works. The album included what would become a hallmark of Joan of Arc's subsequent output: interludes of synthetic noises cut with vocal samples and off-beat instrumentation. As always, Kinsella's lyrics were cryptic and oblique, though the song "This Life Cumulative" made reference to the media alienation of singer-songwriter Fiona Apple. Significant to this shift was the influence of member Jeremy Boyle, whose work with laptop and various software and hardware was a part of his broader multimedia artistic training at the University of Illinois-Chicago's School of Art and Design.

Following the departure of Mike Kinsella, Erik Bocek, and the addition of Todd Mattei, Joan of Arc found themselves thrust unwillingly into the spotlight by the sudden success of a Jade Tree retrospective by Kinsella's former band Cap'n Jazz. Despite being heralded as a pioneer of a diverse genre known as 'emo' (a term rejected by Kinsella), Joan of Arc's next album was a reaction to this unwelcome classification. The songs on the album were slower and contained more spacious arrangements thanks to a newly found fondness for studio trickery. The album's artwork depicted recreated scenes from Jean-Luc Godard's 1967 film Weekend. The release of Live in Chicago also marked the increasing media perception of Joan of Arc as a 'difficult' band, an impression that would dog Kinsella in particular throughout the band's existence.

Reviews of Joan of Arc became especially negative after the release of The Gap in 2000. The Gap was the band's first record made solely in the digital domain, and the nonlinear editing features of Pro Tools encouraged the band to expand the possibilities of what their records could sound like, editing and layering pieces of recordings in a similar manner to Radiohead's Kid A, which was released just one day before The Gap. During the promotion of the album, Kinsella chose to "flip" the relationship between band and journalists by insisting on asking the questions during interviews, which likely contributed to the negative critical response. Growing tensions within the group, Jade Tree's loss of confidence in the band, and a poorly-received follow-up EP led to Joan of Arc's temporary breakup in May 2001.

Tim Kinsella then formed a group called Owls, a reincarnation of the original Cap'n Jazz lineup. After recording the album with Steve Albini in 2001, the departure of Mike Kinsella and Victor Villarreal led to the Owls' breakup. Left without a band once again, Tim Kinsella started working on songs for a solo album. After completing the album with help from Sam Zurick and Mike Kinsella, Tim Kinsella decided that since all three had played in Joan of Arc, it should bear the name Joan of Arc. The album, much different from the conceptual madness of The Gap, instead consisted of guitar-driven tracks with journal-like observation from Tim Kinsella. Heralded as a return to form, So Much Staying Alive And Lovelessness became the band's last on Jade Tree.

Later that year, Joan of Arc released In Rape Fantasy and Terror Sex We Trust on Perishable Records, featured collaborations with Califone's Tim Rutili and Ben Massarella, and was produced by Califone. Although the songs had been recorded during the same sessions as … Lovelessness, they were darker and more collage-based. According to the website AllMusic, on In Rape Fantasy and Terror Sex We Trust, "Joan of Arc ... once more surpassed themselves as artists".

=== Reformation/Polyvinyl (2004–2017) ===
To tour the albums in 2003, Tim Kinsella organized a new lineup including Bobby Burg, Nate Kinsella (Tim's cousin) and Sam Zurick, who would also double as his side-project Make Believe. After a live album recorded in Germany and a split EP with Bundini Brown (of Tortoise and Gastr Del Sol), the band assembled a huge team of collaborators for 2004's Joan of Arc, Dick Cheney, Mark Twain on Polyvinyl Records. This effort was largely well-regarded and a significant step forward for a new incarnation of Joan of Arc.

For the album Presents Guitar Duets, Tim Kinsella rounded up ten former members of Joan of Arc and others like Tim Rutili. Each was paired off with a partner by pulling names from a hat. Each pair then had to record a guitar duet together, and the styles vary from standard acoustic plucking to droning, looped soundscapes. The track names are identified only by the faces of the pair who play on the track.

In 2006, Joan of Arc released a compilation of rarities entitled The Intelligent Design Of… which compiles songs from singles, splits, and compilation released from the band's career up until that point. Shortly after Joan of Arc released Eventually, All at Once, which is largely acoustic, and features members that have been involved throughout the history of Joan of Arc, which was coupled with an EP entitled Many Times I've Mistaken. This EP features two songs from Eventually All at Once but with full bands, and slightly differed arrangements, which continues to showcase the band's eclectic style. In 2007 the Orchard Vale soundtrack was released, which was another experimental release for the band, and is also directed by Kinsella.

In 2008, Joan of Arc released Boo! Human on Polyvinyl Records. It is a more cohesive album than many of their others, and uses 14 musicians to help create this soundscape. The band's next effort, Flowers, partially abandons the more straightforward songwriting from Boo Human, and favors a more experimental setting. The next two releases were in the form of "Joan of Arc Presents ..." which indicates an even more loose collective of people that create the album, while Tim Kinsella serves as chief instrumentalist and songwriter. One of the two, titled Don't Mind Control, features songs from nearly every artist that is associated with Joan of Arc, and was coupled with the Don't Mind Control showcase which featured many of the bands in a live setting.

Oh Brother featured an eclectic ensemble as well, but with the format of four nearly twenty-minute songs that form a collage of sound. In contrast to Joan of Arc's next release, Life Like, these albums are completely different. Life Like marks a point of returning to basics of a sort, with a four-piece band, and is coupled with more regular touring than any recent incarnations of the band.

=== Joyful Noise/Dissolution (2010–2020) ===
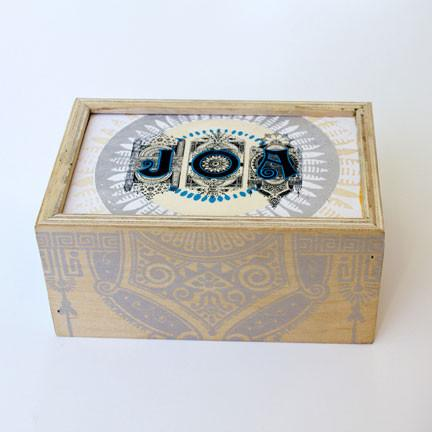
Joan of Arc, Cassette Tape Boxed Set (Joyful Noise Recordings, 2010)

In September 2010, Joyful Noise Recordings released a Joan of Arc 10-album complete cassette box set. Contained in this collection are the 10 full-length studio albums from Joan of Arc, beginning with 1997's A Portable Model Of (Jade Tree) and ending with 2009's Flowers (Polyvinyl).

Though Joan of Arc continued to release full-length LPs with Polyvinyl, Tim Kinsella began releasing his more bizarre, amorphous, experimental work through Joyful Noise Recordings, beginning in 2011 with Oh Brother described as a "combination of four distinct albums embarked upon but never completed by Joan of Arc," with collaborative personnel ranging from Zach Hill (Death Grips, Hella, Face Tat), Rob Lowe and others in a sprawling, ambient instrumental, double-LP.

Other solo & experimental work has work appearing on Joyful Noise Recordings, quickly followed including Lightbox, Joan of Arc Presents Joan of Arc, the self-titled album (known colloquially as the 'Elephant Man Album'), Pinecone, Tim Kinsella Sings the Songs of Marvin Tate by Leroy Bach Featuring Angel Olsen and other projects.

Kinsella was awarded an artist residency at Joyful Noise in 2015. His residency boxed-set included the Issues EP, Firecracker in a Box of Mirrors, Joan of Arc's Greatest Hits 7", JOA 99 LP, Hunky Dory TK, and the book All Over and Over.

Hunky Dory TK was an electronic collage composed entirely of samples from David Bowie's classic, orchestral pop album, Hunky Dory, performed as part of the Museum of Contemporary Art in Chicago's 2015 exhibition "David Bowie Is". In 2013, Joan of Arc collaborated with performance group Every House Has a Door for the album Testimonium Songs and its accompanying performance piece.

In 2017, Joan of Arc released their full-length studio LP He's Got the Whole This Land Is Your Land in His Hands on Joyful Noise Recordings. Thought provoking controversy or critical dismissal in some quarters, it is widely considered to be among JOA's most ambitious and most nearly fully realized "grand experiment."

In 2018, Joan of Arc released their 20th album, 1984. Unusually for a Joan of Arc album, Melina Ausikaitis stands in for Tim Kinsella as lead vocalist. "We were thinking of it as a [late period] Black Flag record, where Melina would sing a song, then the next song was a jam," said Kinsella, describing the structure and sequencing of the material appearing on the album.

In honor of the album's release, Joyful Noise Recordings produced a version of George Orwell's dystopian novel of the same name, Nineteen-Eighty-Four, that substituted the names of the Joan of Arc band members for all of the major characters (Winston Smith -> Tim Kinsella, O'Brien -> Bobby Burg, etc.) and set the story in Chicago (instead of London), posting the revision on 1984.com for a limited time.

On September 23, 2020, the band announced their final studio album titled Tim Melina Theo Bobby, which was released on December 4, 2020.

== Musical style ==
Their musical style has been described as emo, indie rock, post-rock, post-hardcore, and avant-rock.

== Band members ==
Final line-up

- Tim Kinsella – lead vocals, guitar (1995–2020)
- Bobby Burg – bass (2004–2020)
- Theo Katsaounis – drums, percussion (2008–2020)
- Melina Ausikaitis – backing and lead vocals, guitar (2012–2020)

Past contributors

- Sam Zurick – bass, guitar (1995–1998; 2002–2003 (studio only); 2012)
- Erik Bocek – guitar, bass (1995–1998)
- Mike Kinsella – drums, electric guitar (1996–2005)
- Paul Koob – (1997–1999; 2012)
- Todd Mattei – (1998–2005; 2012)
- Victor Villareal – guitar (2010–2012)
- Jeremy Boyle – guitar, keyboards (1995–2001; 2016–2019)
- Josh Abrams
- Leroy Bach
- Amy Cargill
- Matt Clark
- Evan Hydzik
- Emmet Kelley
- Nate Kinsella
- Elizabeth Remis
- Cale Parks
- Liz Payne
- Mark Trecka
- Azita Youssefi
- Ben Vida

== Discography ==
Studio albums

- A Portable Model Of (1997)
- How Memory Works (1998)
- Live in Chicago, 1999 (1999)
- The Gap (2000)
- So Much Staying Alive and Lovelessness (2003)
- In Rape Fantasy and Terror Sex We Trust (2003)
- Joan of Arc, Dick Cheney, Mark Twain (2004)
- Presents Guitar Duets (2005)
- The Intelligent Design Of... (2006)
- Eventually, All at Once (2006)
- Presents Orchard Vale (2007)
- Boo! Human (2008)
- Flowers (2009)
- Presents Don't Mind Control (2010)
- Presents Oh Brother (2011)
- Presents The Joan of Arc Lightbox Orchestra Conducted by Fred Lonberg-Holm (2011)
- Life Like (2011)
- Presents Joan of Arc (2012)
- Presents Pine Cone (2012)
- Joan of Arc (2012)
- Testimonium Songs (2013)
- He's Got the Whole This Land Is Your Land in His Hands (2017)
- 1984 (2018)
- Tim Melina Theo Bobby (2020)

Live albums

- Live in Muenster, 2003 (2004)
- The Free Will Set You Truth (Live Recordings 1996–2018) (2020)
- Weather Diaries (2026)

EPs

- How Can Any Thing So Little Be Any More? (2001)

7"/Splits

- "Method and Sentiment" 7" (1996)
- "Busy Bus" / "Sunny Sun" 7" (1997)
- "Rabbit Rabbit Split" 7" (2003)
- "Bundini Brown Split" 12" (2004)
- "Many Times I've Mistaken" 7" (2007)
- "My Summer-Long High Wipeout" 7" (2008)
- "Meaningful Work" 7" (2010)
- "Theme Song from Rainbo" 7" (2017)
