= Make Believe (band) =

American indie rock band

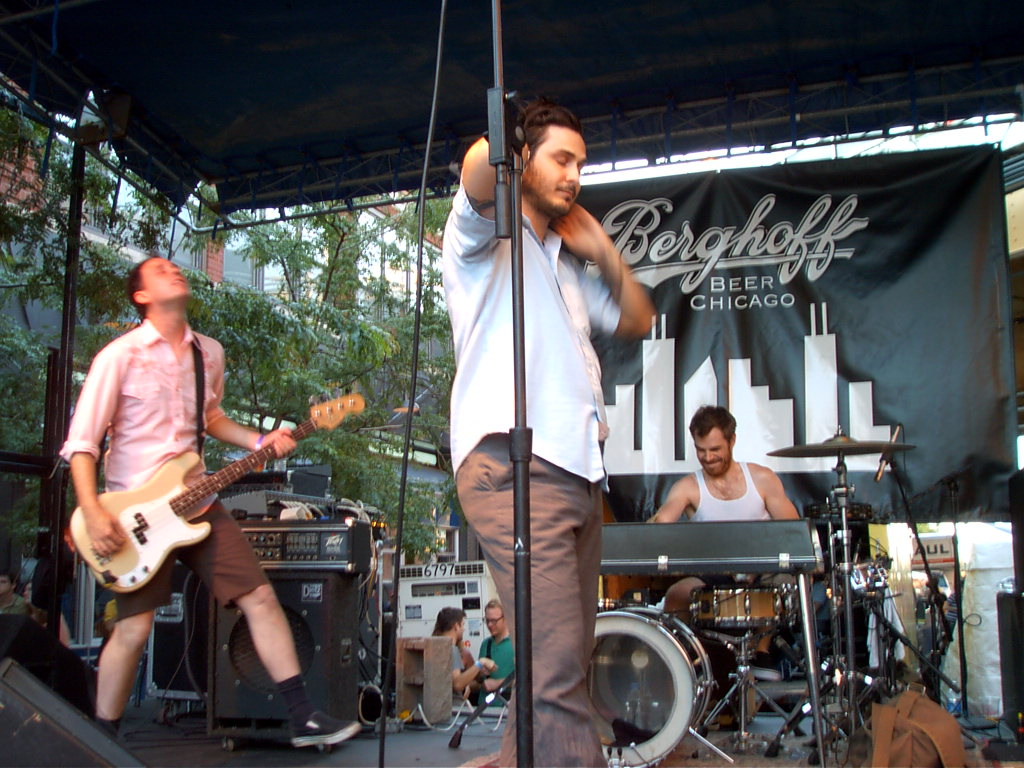
- Make Believe live in 2006

Background information
- Origin: Chicago, Illinois, United States
- Genres: Math rock, indie rock
- Years active: 2003–2008
- Labels: Flameshovel Records
- Spinoff of: Joan of Arc
- Past members: Tim Kinsella; Sam Zurick; Bobby Burg; Nate Kinsella

Make Believe was an indie rock band, initially formed in Chicago, Illinois in 2003 as a touring version of Joan of Arc. The band was composed of lead vocalist Tim Kinsella, guitarist Sam Zurick, bassist Bobby Burg, and drummer/keyboardist Nate Kinsella. After 3 months of touring as Joan of Arc, the quartet returned home and decided to begin writing new songs with a more aggressive approach. Following a self-titled 5 track EP, their first full-length Shock of Being was released on October 4, 2005, followed by Of Course in 2006.

June 20, 2007, Tim Kinsella announced on the Joan of Arc website that he was no longer a member of Make Believe. He attributed his departure to feeling a lessening connection to the "rock band lifestyle", and to a desire to spend more time with his wife. The same announcement stated that Kinsella had "a pile of new songs to pull from for a new Joan of Arc record." The entry implied that the band would continue without Kinsella, but Kinsella returned to the band at the outset of their spring 2008 tour. The band then disbanded the same year.

== Members ==
- Tim Kinsella – vocals, bass guitar (2003–2007, 2008)
- Sam Zurick – guitar (2003–2008)
- Bobby Burg – bass guitar (2003–2008)
- Nate Kinsella – drums, wurlitzer (2003–2008)

== Discography ==
Albums

- Shock of Being CD/LP (released on Flameshovel Records, 2005), produced by Steve Albini
- Of Course CD/LP (released on Flameshovel Records, 2006)
- Going to the Bone Church CD/LP (released on Flameshovel Records, 2008)

Compilations

- The Association of Utopian Hologram Swallowers 2x7" (released on Polyvinyl Records, 2005)

EPs/Singles/7"

- Make Believe CD EP (released on Flameshovel Records, 2004)
- The Pink 7" (released on Flameshovel Records, 2004)
- Can't Tell Cop From Cap Flexi-disc (released on Joyful Noise, 2012)
