= Tim Kinsella =

American musician (born 1974)

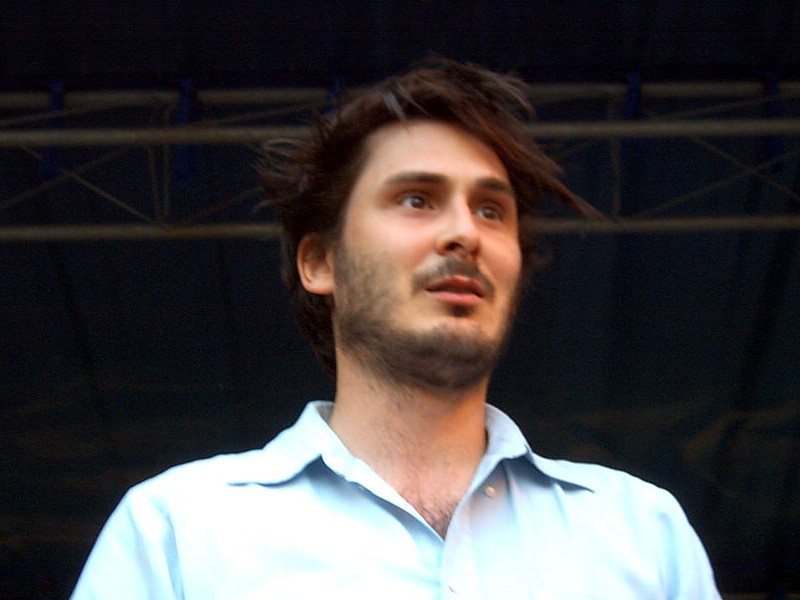
- Kinsella in 2006

Background information
- Also known as: Tim Kinsella(s)
- Born: October 22, 1974 (age 52)
- Origin: Chicago, Illinois
- Genres: Math rock; midwest emo; emo; post-hardcore; indie rock; electronic
- Occupations: Singer; author; university instructor; conceptual artist; bartender
- Instruments: Guitar; Vocals; French horn
- Years active: 1989–present
- Labels: Joyful Noise Recordings; Polyvinyl; Jade Tree; Flameshovel Records; et al.
- Member of: Kinsella & Pulse, LLC; Owls
- Formerly of: Cap'n Jazz; Joan of Arc; Make Believe; Friend/Enemy; et al.
- Website: goofduck.com

Tim Kinsella (born October 22, 1974) is an American musician, author, and film director from Chicago, Illinois. Known for his eccentric singing voice, he first rose to prominence as lead singer and lyricist of the emo band Cap'n Jazz which he co-founded with his brother Mike in 1989. Following its dissolution in 1995, he formed Joan of Arc the same year and served as its lead singer, primary songwriter, and only continuous member until their breakup in 2020.

In 2001, Kinsella participated in Owls which included all members of Cap'n Jazz except for guitarist Davey von Bohlen. From 2003 to 2008, Kinsella also founded and toured with Make Believe which included his cousin Nate and former Cap'n Jazz member Sam Zurick alongside bassist Bobby Burg. He has also released early solo material under the alias Tim Kinsella(s) in addition to participating Friend/Enemy and Everyoned.

Kinsella is the writer-director of the feature film Orchard Vale, which opened at the Chicago Underground Film Festival on August 15, 2007. His first novel, entitled The Karaoke Singer's Guide to Self-Defense, was published by Featherproof Books in September 2011. His second book, Let Go and Go On and On (Curbside Splendor Publishing), takes its inspiration from the late actress Laurie Bird's brief film career in the '70s, and was published in April 2014. He currently performs, tours, and writes music with his wife Jenny Pulse under the name "Tim Kinsella & Jenny Pulse."

== Career ==
Tim Kinsella got his start musically around 1989 when he, his brother, Mike Kinsella, met Sam Zurick, and Victor Villarreal to form Cap'n Jazz. They were all in school at the time, and it took them a while to get serious about playing music. After going through several name changes, and adding guitarist Davey von Bohlen, the group decided to make music seriously, ultimately garnering a cult following, and fame in the independent music scene of Chicago and the midwest. Kinsella directed the film Orchard Vale, which was released on DVD through I Had an Accident Records in April 2009.

=== Cap'n Jazz: 1989–1995; 2010; 2017; 2024 ===
Following the release of Cap'n Jazz's first and only album, Burritos, Inspiration Point, Fork Balloon Sports, Cards In The Spokes, Automatic Biographies, Kites, Kung Fu, Trophies, Banana Peels We've Slipped On and Egg Shells We've Tippy Toed Over (also known as Shmap'n Shmazz), and their last show on July 14, 1995, they disbanded, and member Davey von Bohlen left Chicago to focus on his side project The Promise Ring. Three years after the breakup, in 1998, Jade Tree Records put out a double disc compilation, called Analphabetapolothology, which included all the songs from Shmap'n Shmazz, as well as songs from various 7", singles, demos and outtakes. Victor Villarreal went home, and after a year of playing music independently, Tim, Mike, and Sam recruited Erik Bocek and Jeremy Boyle for what would eventually be called Joan of Arc. On January 22, 2010, Cap'n Jazz played their first reunion show since the split in 1995 at the Empty Bottle in their hometown of Chicago. They have performed various other shows since and played their then-final show on November 8, 2017, at the Electric Ballroom.

=== Joan of Arc ===
After the demise of Cap'n Jazz, Kinsella began writing new material with keyboardist Jeremy Boyle. At this point, he was learning a new instrument (the guitar), and his songwriting began to take an abstract/experimental turn. Simultaneously, Sam Zurick was learning the drums, and playing in a band with Erik Bocek (a high school friend and former Cap'n Jazz roadie). The two were joined, and after the addition of Mike Kinsella, Red Blue Yellow was born.

After difficulties, and a breakup after their first show, they threw away all of their old material, and started afresh, with a new name, and new songs. Three months later, Joan of Arc had their first show at Autonomous Zone in Chicago. After two promising 7" singles the band recorded their debut album A Portable Model of... for Jade Tree. The album introduced JOA's signature sound - a fondness for stark acoustic songs then altered with subtle electronics.

The 2017 Noisey documentary Your War (I'm One of You): 20 Years of Joan of Arc focuses heavily on Kinsella's biography and personal experiences.

=== Owls ===
Owls is an indie rock band from Chicago, Illinois. The band was formed by the original lineup of seminal experimental indie rock band Cap'n Jazz soon after its second breakup (the first came in 1994); Cap'n Jazz guitarist Davey Von Bohlen, who played in the band's second incarnation, had gone on to found, and was now playing in The Promise Ring. The band's lineup consisted of brothers Tim Kinsella and Mike Kinsella (on vocals and drums, respectively), along with guitarist Victor Villarreal and bassist Sam Zurick. Tim Kinsella and Zurick have also played together in Joan of Arc and Make Believe, and Villareal and Zurick have played together in the instrumental-rock Ghosts and Vodka.

The band released an album, Owls, in 2001. However, the band dissolved after one tour. Rumours circulated that this was largely due to the complications arising from guitarist Victor Villarreal's heroin dependency. When Mike Kinsella left to continue his solo project Owen and to play guitar for Maritime, he was replaced for a few live shows by Ryan Rapsys.

The band did eventually get back together in 2012, and went on to tour and released a new album in 2014.

=== Friend/Enemy ===
Friend/Enemy was formed in 2001 as the next in a series of projects fronted by Kinsella. The band's core members include Kinsella, Todd Mattei (also of Joan of Arc), and Jim Becker (Califone). Friend/Enemy can best be described as a loose folk-punk somewhere between T.V. Smith and Captain Beefheart. Kinsella's trademark postmodern beat poet routine takes a sharper, more adult turn and Becker adds a host of incidental noises including banjo, pedal steel, and percussion. The first release, 10 Songs, was recorded at the Slabb in Chicago and had a handful of the city's musical intelligentsia adding sounds. These included vocals by Caryn Culp (Plastic Crime Wave), keyboards by Andy Lansagan (the 90 Day Men), bass by Nick Macri (Euphone, Sunny Day Real Estate), piano by Azita Youssefi (Bride of No No), drums by Zach Hill (Hella), and bass by Sam Zurick (Joan of Arc, Owls).

=== Everyoned ===
Kinsella has participated in Everyoned, a supergroup which also includes members from Joan of Arc, Pigface, TV Pow, Town & Country, Revolting Cocks, and Central Falls.

=== Make Believe ===
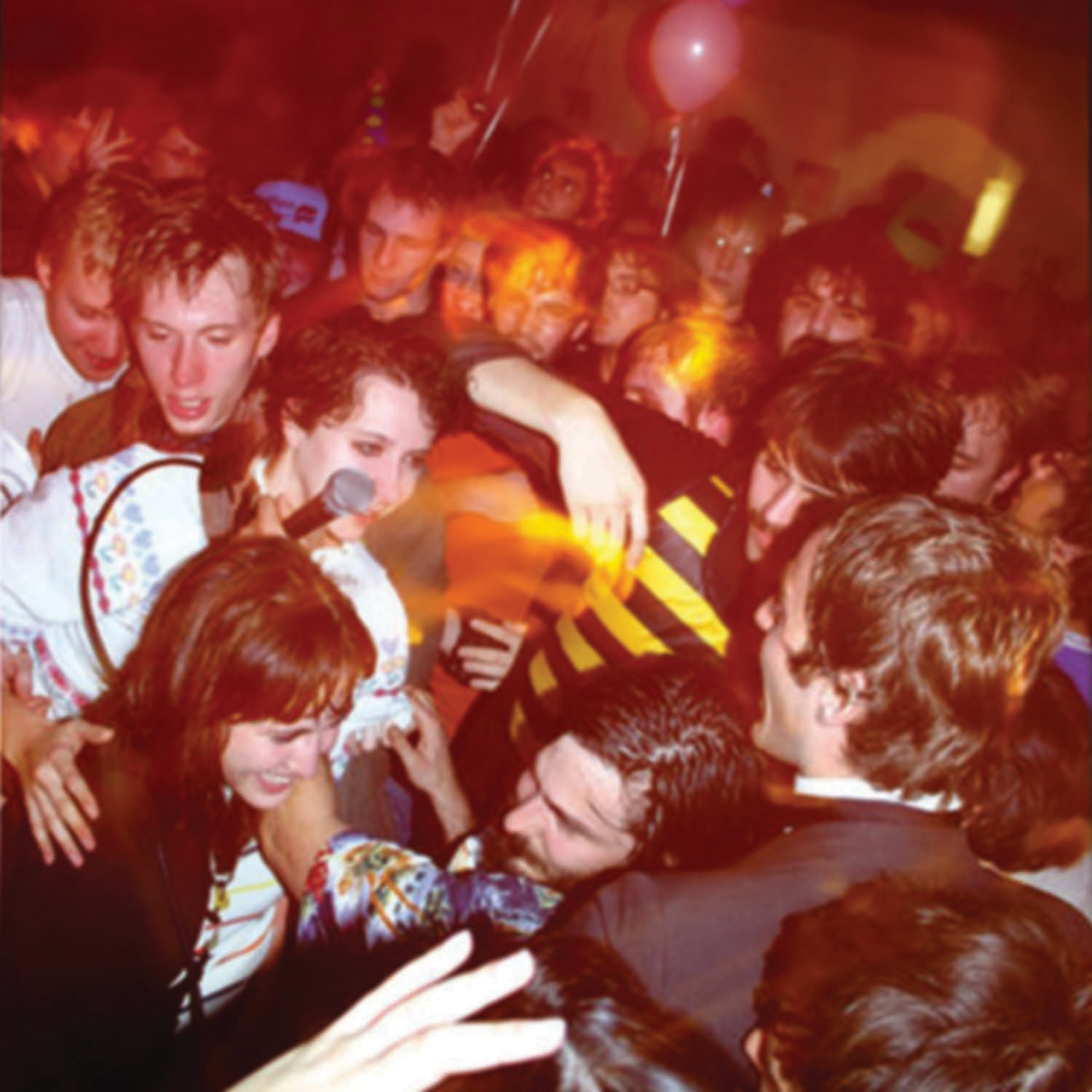
Make Believe on tour, c. 2003.

Make Believe is 2003's touring version of Joan of Arc, consisting of singer Tim Kinsella, guitarist Sam Zurick, bassist Bobby Burg, and drummer Nate Kinsella. After 3 months of touring solidified their playing together, they returned home and decided to follow this impulse and write new songs with a more aggressive approach. But they all knew it had to be something different than Joan of Arc. For it to be represented as a true collaboration and reflect its totally different approach to songwriting and speak for itself it had to shake whatever connotations the band name Joan of Arc had acquired. Their first full-length Shock of Being was released on October 4, 2005. In June 2007 Kinsella left the band to focus on other projects and married life. However, months after his departure from the band, Kinsella rejoined his bandmates and recorded their third album in fall 2007. On February 22, 2008, the band played their first show since Kinsella's departure at Chicago's Subterranean. The third full-length Goin' to the Bone Church was released on April 29, 2008.

== Collaborations ==
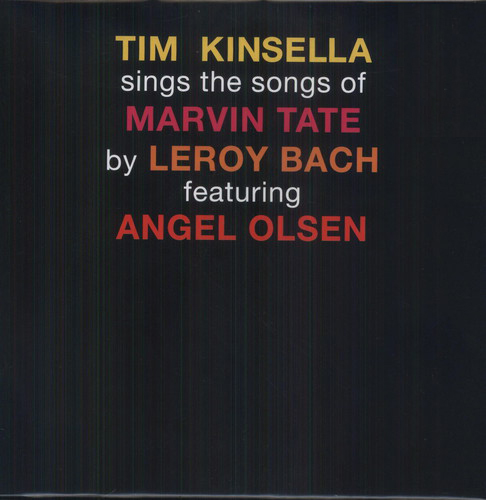
Tim Kinsella sings the songs of Marvin Tate by Leroy Bach with Angel Olsen

Tim has also worked on numerous collaborations. One example of these collaborations would include 2014's "Tim Kinsella sings the songs of Marvin Tate by LeRoy Bach featuring Angel Olsen." Kinsella worked with an array of Chicago heavyweights including the prolific poet Marvin Tate, multi-instrumentalist (& former Wilco member) LeRoy Bach and singer-songwriter Angel Olsen for "almost two years" to record the eponymously titled LP, released by Joyful Noise Recordings. Kinsella is the album's narrator, walking the line between judgment and sympathy, and shepherding all of the characters through their various struggles. Themes of race, private culture, and psychological stress rise throughout the work. Eventually the consensus was made that some of the stories could be enhanced by an additional singer. The trio enlisted their friend Angel Olsen Jagjaguwar Records. The release is limited to just 1000 copies on splatter vinyl.

Tim contributed his guitar work to the A Set CD "The Science of Living Things" released on the now defunct label Tree Records.

In 2013, Joan of Arc worked with the Chicago experimental theater-ensemble Every House Has a Door, to produce a dramatization of Charles Reznikoff's Testimony.

Joan of Arc presents Don't Mind Control, collects the work of 41 of the group's musical collaborators.

== Tim Kinsella(s) ==
After the release of the Gap, Tim started to do some solo work for Troubleman Unlimited, and decided that this new era should coincide with a name change. He released 4 works under Tim Kinsellas for various labels. Tim had a falling out with the head of Troubleman Unlimited over royalties and currently the two are not speaking even though Tim admits his error on the issue. Tim's solo release entitled "Crucifix/Swastika" was written while he was on his honeymoon. Field Recordings of Dreams was recorded late at night.

Other solo work has appeared on Joyful Noise Recordings, where Kinsella was artist in residence in 2015. His residency boxed-set included: Issues EP, Firecracker in a Box of Mirrors LP, Joan of Arc's Greatest Hits 7", JOA 99 LP, Hunky Dory TK, and the book All Over and Over.

Hunky Dory TK was an electronic collage composed entirely of samples from David Bowie's classic, orchestral pop album, Hunky Dory, performed as part of the Museum of Contemporary Art in Chicago's 2015 exhibition "David Bowie Is".

== Personal life ==
Kinsella has worked as a bartender at the Rainbo Club in Chicago's Ukrainian Village neighborhood for most of his adult life. His brother Mike Kinsella refers to his bartending in the song "Breaking Away" on Owen's (The EP) (2004).

== Discography ==
=== The Sky Corvair ===
- The Sky Corvair, Unsafe At Any Speed CD (Actionboy, 1997)

=== Everyoned ===
- Everyoned, Everyoned CD (Brilliante Records, 2003)

=== Make Believe ===
- Shock of Being CD/LP (Flameshovel, 2005)
- Of Course CD/LP (Flameshovel, 2006)
- Going To The Bone Church CD/LP (Flameshovel, 2008)

=== Owls ===
- Owls (Jade Tree, 2001)
- Two (Polyvinyl, 2014)

=== Solo ===
- Tim Kinsellas, He Sang His Didn't He Danced His Did CD (Troubleman Unlimited Records, 2001)
- The Association of Utopian Hologram Swallowers (a compilation of bands associated with Tim Kinsella, 2005)
- Tim Kinsella, Crucifix/Swastika CD (Record Label Records, 2005)
- Tim Kinsella, Field Recordings of Dreams CD/Recycled Cassette (I Had an Accident Records, 2007)

=== Kinsella & Pulse, LLC ===
- Giddy Skelter CD (Kill Rock Stars, 2023)
- Open ing Night (Kill Rock Stars, 2025)

==== EPs/7" ====
- Gene McDonald/Ronald Simmons Split Demands Feminist Critique CD EP (BoxMedia Ltd., 2002)
- Postmarked Stamps #6: Tim Kinsella/Jen Wood Split 7" (Tree Records, 1998)
- Julia LaDense / Tim Kinsella Split CDr (Felt Cat Records, 2009)
