= Owen discography =

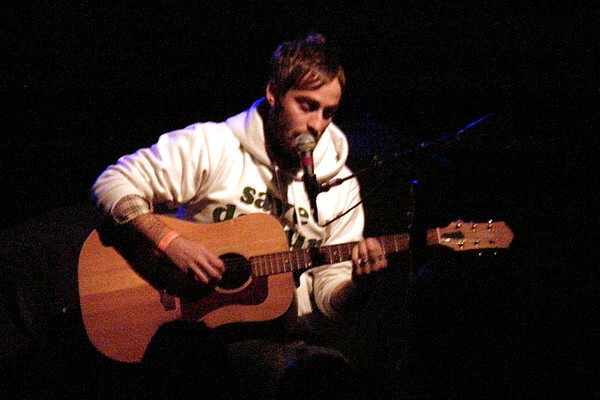
- Studio albums: 11
- EPs: 2
- Singles: 2
- Music videos: 5
- Splits: 4

The discography of Owen, an American indie rock band, consists of eleven studio albums, one compilation albums, two extended plays (EPs), and three split albums.

== Albums ==
=== Studio albums ===
Year	Album details	Peak chart positions
Year	Album details	US Heatseekers
2001	Owen: Released: September 18, 2001; Label: Polyvinyl	—
2002	No Good for No One Now: Released: November 19, 2002; Label: Polyvinyl	—
2004	I Do Perceive: Released: November 9, 2004; Label: Polyvinyl	—
2006	At Home with Owen: Released: November 7, 2006; Label: Polyvinyl, Hobbledehoy Record Co.	—
2009	New Leaves: Released: September 22, 2009; Label: Polyvinyl, Hobbledehoy Record Co., &Records	28
2011	Ghost Town: Released: November 8, 2011; Label: Polyvinyl	14
2013	L'Ami du Peuple: Released: July 2, 2013; Label: Polyvinyl	—
2014	Other People's Songs: Released: December 2, 2014; Label: Polyvinyl	—
2016	The King of Whys: Released: July 29, 2016; Label: Polyvinyl	—
2020	The Avalanche: Released: June 19, 2020; Label: Polyvinyl	—
2024	The Falls of Sioux: Released: April 26, 2024; Label: Polyvinyl	—

=== Extended plays ===
Year	Album details
2004	(the ep): Released: May 4, 2004; Label: Polyvinyl
2009	The Seaside EP: Released: July 7, 2009; Label: Polyvinyl

=== Split albums ===
Year	Album details
2004	The Rutabega/Owen Split EP: Released: October 1, 2004; Label: Backroad, Polyvinyl; Split with: The Rutabega
2007	Owen/The City on Film Split 7": Released: October 1, 2007; Label: RedCarsGoFaster; Split with: The City of Film
2015	Owen/Into It. Over It. Split EP: Released: August 21, 2015; Label: Polyvinyl; Split with: Into It. Over It.
2015	Devinyl Splits No. 5: Released: December 18, 2015; Label: Bad Timing; Split with: Kevin Devine
2016	Colossal/Owen Split: Released: September 16, 2016; Label: Asian Man Records; Split with: Colossal

== Singles ==
Year	Album details
2010	Abandoned Bridges: Released: September 28, 2010; Label: Polyvinyl Records
2011	O, Evelyn: Released: April 16, 2011; Label: Polyvinyl Records
2021	Me (The 1975 cover): Released: April 7, 2020; Label: Polyvinyl Records

== Videography ==
=== Music videos ===
Year	Song	Director	Album
2006	One of These Days	Joe Wigdahl	At Home With Owen
2009	"Good Friends, Bad Habits"	Joe Wigdahl	New Leaves
2013	"Bad Blood"	Samuel Gursky & Mitchell Wojcik	L'Ami du Peuple
