= American Football discography =

Rock band discography

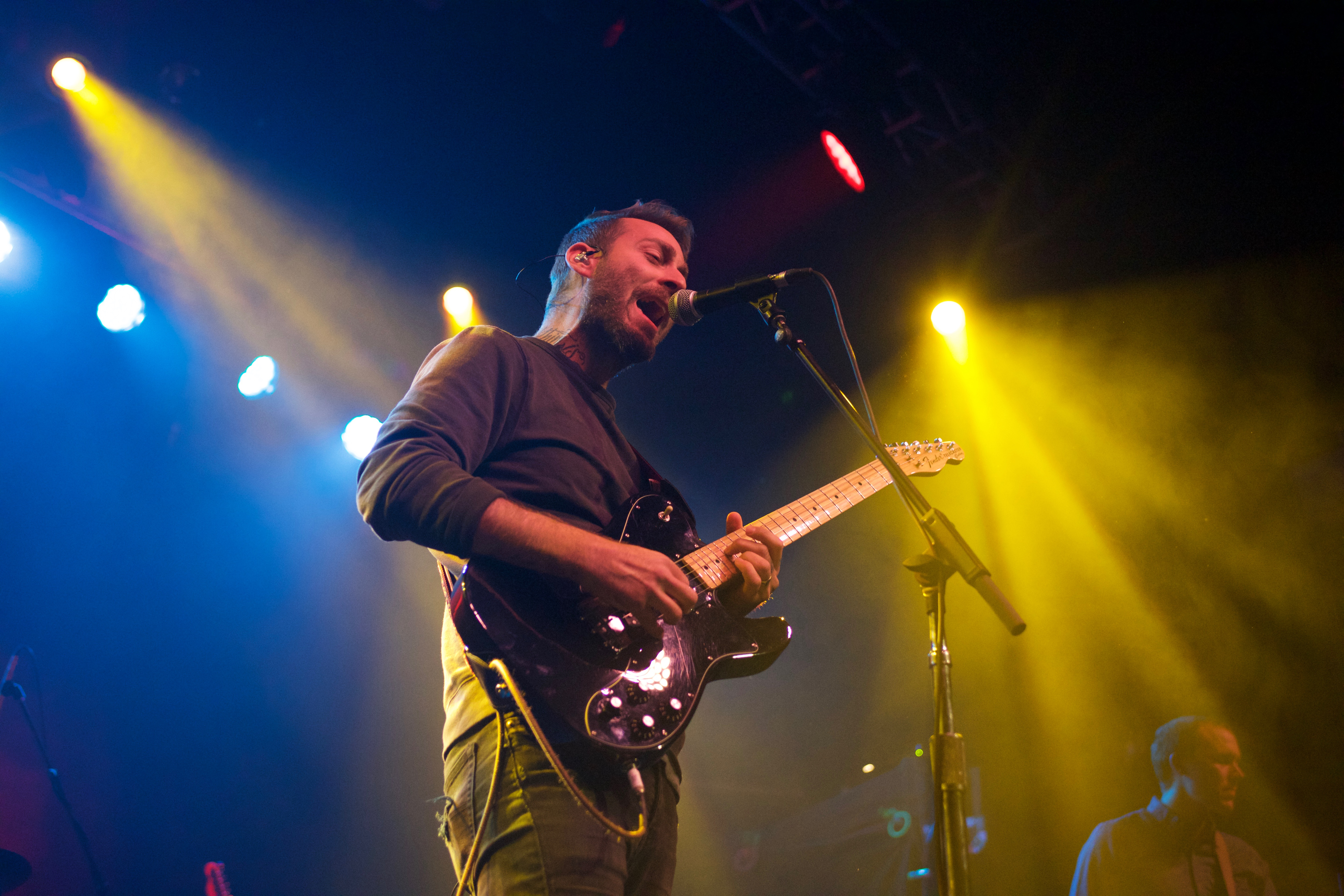
- American Football performing in 2017
- Studio albums: 4
- EPs: 2
- Singles: 4
- Music videos: 8

The discography of the American rock and emo (Note: The genre of American Football has been described as emo, midwestern emo, and math rock.) band American Football consists of four studio albums, two extended plays (EP), four singles and eight music videos. Because all four albums are eponymous, they are known as LP1, LP2, LP3, and LP4. The band was formed in 1997 in Urbana, Illinois, by Mike Kinsella, Steve Lamos, and Steve Holmes while they were students at the University of Illinois at Urbana-Champaign. A year later, they released a self-titled EP, followed by their debut studio album, American Football (LP1), in 1999. Shortly after, the band graduated from college, and not expecting the album to receive any attention, broke up.

LP1's music and enigmatic cover art, which shows a green tinted picture of a white house in Urbana (which later became known as the American Football House), developed a word-of-mouth cult following, and today is considered a central influence on the 2010s emo revival. In 2014, Polyvinyl Records re-released LP1 as a deluxe edition, which reached number 68 on the Billboard 200. Its success led to the band reforming for a series of live shows that year, for which they recruited Nate Kinsella, Mike Kinsella's nephew. In 2016, they released their second album, American Football (LP2), which reached number 82 on the Billboard 200 and number 3 on the Independent Albums chart. They followed up with American Football (LP3), and an extended play of early demos, Year One Demos, in 2019. LP3 and Year One Demos reached numbers 4 and 44 respectively on the Independent Albums chart; although neither record reached the Billboard 200.

== Albums ==
=== Studio albums ===
List of studio albums, with selected chart positions
Title	Details	Peak chart positions					
Title	Details	US	US Indie	US Rock	SCO	UK Sales	UK Indie
American Football (LP1)	Released: September 14, 1999 (Note: LP1 was re-issued by Polyvinyl on May 20, 2014 as a deluxe edition.); Label: Polyvinyl	68	—	—	—	—	—
American Football (LP2)	Released: October 21, 2016; Label: Polyvinyl	82	3	14	71	83	17
American Football (LP3)	Released: March 22, 2019; Label: Polyvinyl	— (Note: American Football (LP3) did not enter the Billboard 200, but peaked at number 17 on the US Top Album Sales chart.)	4	45	38	51	17
American Football (LP4)	Released: May 1, 2026; Label: Polyvinyl	— (Note: American Football (LP4) did not enter the Billboard 200, but peaked at number 23 on the US Top Album Sales chart.)	—	—	35	41	14
"—" denotes a recording that did not chart.

=== Live albums ===
List of live albums
Title	Details	Peak chart positions
Title	Details	UK DL
American Football (Live in Los Angeles)	Released: July 2, 2025; Label: Polyvinyl; Formats: Vinyl, digital download	32

== Extended plays ==
List of extended plays with selected chart positions
Title	Details	Peak chart positions
Title	Details	US Indie
American Football	Released: October 6, 1998; Label: Polyvinyl	—
Year One Demos	Released: December 13, 2019; Label: Polyvinyl	44
"—" denotes a recording that did not chart.

== Singles ==
List of singles, showing year released and album name
Title	Year	Peak chart positions	Album
Title	Year	UK Phys.	Album
"Give Me the Gun"	2016	—	American Football (LP2)
"I've Been Lost for So Long"	2016	—	American Football (LP2)
"Silhouettes"	2019	—	American Football (LP3)
"Uncomfortably Numb" (featuring Hayley Williams)	2019	—	American Football (LP3)
"Rare Symmetry" / "Fade Into You"	2021	14	Non-album single
"Bad Moons"	2026	—	American Football (LP4)
"No Feeling" (featuring Brendan Yates)	2026	—	American Football (LP4)
"—" denotes a recording that did not chart or was not released in that territory.

== Music videos ==
List of music videos that American Football has released with the year, album the song is on, and the director
Title	Year	Album	Director	Ref.
"Never Meant"	2014	American Football (LP1)	Chris Strong	
"I've Been So Lost for So Long"	2017	American Football (LP2)	Matt Mayer and Ben Wietmarschen	
"My Instincts Are the Enemy"	2017	American Football (LP2)	Chris Strong	
"Home Is Where the Haunt Is"	2017	American Football (LP2)	Erin Elders	
"Uncomfortably Numb" (featuring Hayley Williams)	2019	American Football (LP3)	Atiba Jefferson	
"Silhouettes"	2019	American Football (LP3)	Shawn Brackbill	
"Every Wave to Ever Rise" (featuring Elizabeth Powell)	2019	American Football (LP3)	Hydeon	
"I Can't Feel You" (featuring Rachel Goswell)	2019	American Football (LP3)	David M. Helman	
"Fade into You" (featuring Miya Folick)	2022	Non-album single	David M. Helman	
