= American football (disambiguation) =

American football, a sport popularly called football in the United States, is a type of gridiron football.

American football may also refer to:

== Sports ==
- Football in America (disambiguation)
- Ball (gridiron football), used in American and Canadian football
- Soccer in the United States, American involvement in the sport known as football in much of the world
- American Eagles, for American University football
- Football played in the American Athletic Conference
- American football in the United States

== Arts and entertainment ==
- American Football (band), an American indie rock band with five eponymous albums
  - American Football (EP), 1998
  - American Football (1999 album)
  - American Football (2016 album)
  - American Football (2019 album)
  - American Football (2026 album)
- "American Football", a 1991 poem by Harold Pinter
