= American Football (Live in Los Angeles) =

Live album by American Football
- Released: July 2, 2025
- Recorded: October 12-13, 2024
- Venues: El Rey Theatre, Los Angeles
- Genres: Emo; math rock; indie rock; post-rock
- Length: 51:13
- Label: Polyvinyl
- Producer: American Football

American Football chronology
| Year One Demos (2019) | American Football (Live in Los Angeles) (2025) | American Football (2026) |

American Football (Live in Los Angeles) is the first live album by American rock band, American Football, released on July 2, 2025, via Polyvinyl Records. The album was recorded at the El Rey Theatre in Los Angeles in October 2024, during the band's 25th anniversary tour for their first self-titled album, where they performed it in its entirety. The album was released alongside a concert film.

The album was originally released in February 2025 exclusively on Bandcamp to support wildfire relief for those impacted by the Los Angeles wildfires.

== Track listing ==
All songs written and composed by American Football.

American Football (Live in Los Angeles) track listing
| No. | Title | Length |
|---|---|---|
| 1. | "Five Silent Miles" | 5:01 |
| 2. | "The Summer Ends" | 5:59 |
| 3. | "Honestly?" | 5:36 |
| 4. | "For Sure" | 5:33 |
| 5. | "You Know I Should Be Leaving Soon" | 4:34 |
| 6. | "But the Regrets Are Killing Me" | 4:58 |
| 7. | "I'll See You When We're Both Not So Emotional" | 3:59 |
| 8. | "Stay Home" / "The One With the Wurlitzer" | 10:34 |
| 9. | "Never Meant" | 4:56 |
| Total length: | | 51:13 |

== Personnel ==
- Mike Kinsella – vocals, guitar
- Steve Holmes – guitar
- Nate Kinsella – bass, vocals, guitar, percussion, on-stage lighting & projections
- Steve Lamos – drums, trumpet
- Cory Bracken – vibraphone, percussion
- Mike Garzon – guitar, vocals, percussion
- Ethel Cain
- M.A.G.S.
- Che Arthur – live recording
- Meric Long – mixing
- Jake Viator – mastering
- Zach Sternberg – lighting design
- Alec Basse & Max Moore – video projections
- John Osborne – in-house lighting director
- Atiba Jefferson – album cover photo

== Charts ==
Chart performance for American Football (Live in Los Angeles)
| Chart (2025) | Peak position |
|---|---|
| UK Album Downloads (Official Charts) | 32 |
