= The Seaside EP =

EP by Owen
- Released: July 7, 2009
- Genre: Acoustic
- Length: 27:44
- Label: Polyvinyl Records

Owen chronology
Owen/The City on Film Split 7" (2007)	The Seaside EP (2009)	New Leaves (2009)

Professional ratings
Review scores
Source	Rating
Absolutepunk	(4.8/10) link
PunkNews	link
SputnikMusic	(3.5/5) link

The Seaside EP is a rarities release by Chicago artist Owen. It was released on July 7, 2009 by Polyvinyl Records digitally and as a CD (limited to 3,000 copies). The album was said to ship on June 26, 2009, but was sent out a week earlier as Polyvinyl received them. The EP's cover art was designed by UK illustrator David Blanco. The majority of songs can all be found on Japanese Owen releases, and the last track is from a compilation 2x7". It was re-released on vinyl on Record Store Day 2013.

== Track listing ==
All tracks are written by Mike Kinsella, except where noted.

No.	Title	Original Appearance	Length
1.	"Heads Will Ache"	Owen Japanese version	6:52
2.	"I Woke Up Today"	I Do Perceive Japanese version	2:26
3.	"In The Morning, Before Work (live)"	I Do Perceive Japanese version and (The EP)	3:35
4.	"More Than Words" (Nuno Bettencourt/Gary Cherone)	I Do Perceive Japanese version	3:25
5.	"A Fever"	At Home with Owen Japanese version	3:11
6.	"Stolen Car" (Bruce Springsteen)	At Home with Owen Japanese version	4:49
7.	"I'm Not Seventeen"	The Association of Utopian Hologram Swallowers	3:32
Total length:			27:44
