= North American football =

North American football may refer to:

- CONCACAF, the association football governing body in North America, Central America, and the Caribbean
  - North American Football Union, a regional grouping under CONCACAF of national football organizations in the North American Zone
  - North American Football Confederation, the former association football governing body in North America
- Gridiron football, a football sport played primarily in Canada and the United States
- North American Football League, a defunct proposed American spring football league
- North American Soccer Football League, a former soccer league

== See also ==
- American football
- American football (disambiguation)
- Association football in America (disambiguation)
- Canadian football
- International Federation of American Football
- List of leagues of American and Canadian football
- North American Indoor Football League (disambiguation)
