= Year One Demos =

EP demo by American Football
- Released: December 13, 2019
- Recorded: May 1997
- Studios: Steve Lamos' basement, Urbana, IL
- Genre: Math rock
- Length: 19:47
- Label: Polyvinyl
- Producer: American Football

American Football chronology
American Football (2019)	Year One Demos (2019)	American Football (Live in Los Angeles) (2025)

Professional ratings
Review scores
Source	Rating
Pitchfork	7.6/10

Year One Demos is a 2019 EP from American emo and math rock band American Football. The recordings were made by drummer Steve Lamos' father shortly after the band formed and were rediscovered several years later; the EP was released to coincide with the 20th anniversary of the band's full-length, self-titled debut album.

== Reception ==
Writing for Pitchfork, Nina Corcoran scored this release a 7.6 out of 10, writing that the "one thing demos succeed at where finished recordings fail is their ability to convey the warmth of an idea’s spark". Kevin Korber of Spectrum Culture also gave a positive review, writing that "hearing Year One Demos in this context is kind of revelatory" for giving insight to the band's early evolution as a musical project and summing up the release as "an essential listen for die-hard fans of the band" that is "more substantial than its length or its status as a collection of demos would suggest".

== Track listing ==
1. "Five Silent Miles" (Demo) – 4:18
2. "Song #1" / "Song #2"" (Demo) – 6:41
3. "The Summer Ends" (Demo) – 4:47
4. "For Sure" (Demo) – 4:01

== Personnel ==
American Football

- Steve Holmes – guitars, liner notes
- Mike Kinsella – guitars (1-3); bass guitar (4)
- Steve Lamos – drums; drum machine (4); trumpet (2, 4)

Additional personnel

- Steve Fallone – mastering at Sterling Sound
- Jerrod Landon Porter – layout
- Max Stern – cover
- Mitchell Wojcik – photography

== Charts ==
Chart (2019)	Peak position
US Independent Albums (Billboard)	44

== See also ==
- List of 2019 albums
