= Devinyl Splits No. 5 =

EP by Owen and Kevin Devine
- Released: December 18, 2015
- Recorded: 2015
- Genre: Indie rock
- Length: 5:25
- Label: Bad Timing Records

Owen chronology
Owen/Into It. Over It. Split EP (2015)	Devinyl Splits No. 5 (2015)	The King of Whys (2016)

Kevin Devine chronology
Devinyl Splits No. 4 (2015)	Devinyl Splits No. 5 (2015)	Live At St. Pancras Old Church (2016)

Devinyl Splits No. 5 is a split album between Owen and Kevin Devine. This is the 5th release in the series of the Devinyl Splits. Devinyl Splits is a six-part split 7-inch series featuring Kevin Devine and friends.

== Track listing ==
No.	Title	Music	Length
1.	"Critical Condition"	Owen	3:17
2.	"No One Says You Have To"	Kevin Devine	2:08
Total length:			5:25

== Personnel ==
Owen

- Mike Kinsella – guitar, vocals, drums, bass

Kevin Devine

- Kevin Devine – guitar, vocals

Production

- Neil Strauch – engineering, mixing (tracks 1)
- Kevin Devine – engineering, mixing (tracks 2)
- Jesse Cannon – mastering (tracks 1 & 2)
- Matt Delisle – art direction, design
