= Crissi Cochrane =

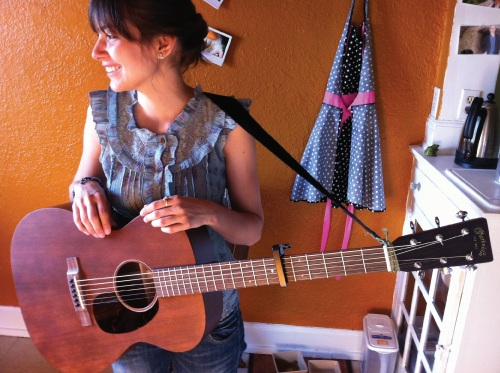

Background information
- Origin: Halifax, Nova Scotia, Canada
- Genres: Pop music, Soul music, Folk music
- Years active: 2006–present
- Label: Soul City Music Co-op
- Website: www.crissicochrane.com

Crissi Cochrane is a Canadian pop singer-songwriter based in Windsor, Ontario.

== Career ==
Cochrane was born and raised in the Annapolis Valley of Nova Scotia. She released her first recordings as a high school student, under the name "Save September". After graduation, Cochrane relocated to Halifax where she was based for three years before eventually moving to Windsor, Ontario in 2010.

=== 2009–2012: The folk era ===
While residing in Halifax, Cochrane studied Music Business at the Nova Scotia Community College in Dartmouth, Nova Scotia and began performing under her own name in 2009. In addition to her solo work, she held a role in indie rock band Gamma Gamma Rays from 2008 to 2010, and contributed guest vocals on Rich Aucoin's EP We're All Dying To Live (Sonic Records, 2011). At the EP's release show in Halifax, Cochrane joined Rich for a duet of the song "Undead Pt. 1: Estrangement". Just weeks before moving to Ontario by train in August 2010, she released Darling, Darling, a full-length album recorded at SOMA Electronic Music Studios in Chicago, Illinois. The record features guest performer Mike Kinsella (of Owen, American Football) on percussion and additional guitar. In the same month, Gamma Gamma Rays released the LP Beeps, recorded at the Echo Chamber in Halifax. The group disbanded after Cochrane's departure.

In late 2011, she released the EP Pretty Alright. The EP reached the No. 5 on the national folk chart for campus and community radio and No. 153 of the Top 200 in Canada for the month of December 2011.

=== 2014–present: Breakthrough with Little Sway; Heirloom ===
After three years of living in the Windsor/Detroit region, she released her second full-length studio album, Little Sway, in January 2014. The album carries the influence of jazz, soul, bossa nova, Motown, and R&B. The album reached No. 30 on the National Top 50 in February 2014 on campus and community radio. Cochrane placed in the Top 10 nationwide in the 2014 CBC Searchlight Contest (The Hunt for Canada's Best New Artist), being one of five artists selected by public vote. She represented the Windsor region in the contest with "And Still We Move", the first single from Little Sway.

Her song "A Damn Shame" from Little Sway was placed in "Is the Better Part Over?", the 21st episode of the season 3 of ABC's Nashville, in 2015. In 2016, her song "Pretty Words" went viral on Spotify, receiving 12 million plays. Little Sway, with "Sleep in the Wild" as lead single, was released in Italy in 2018.

Cochrane released "Hungry Love", the first single from her album Heirloom, on 7 January 2020. The album was released 29 February 2020.

Since then, Cochrane has released two singles: "Can We Go Back", on 14 August 2020, and "Why", on 23 September 2021, whose crowdfunded music video was animated by Sheridan College student Delaney Beaudoin.

== Discography ==
=== Albums ===
Year	Title	Artist	Format	Label	Role
2010	Darling, Darling	Crissi Cochrane	CD	Independent	Composer, guitar, vocals, flute
2010	Beeps	Gamma Gamma Rays	CD/LP	Hot Money Records	Mandolin, vocals, flute
2014^{a}	Little Sway	Crissi Cochrane	CD	Independent^{a}	Composer, guitar, vocals, ukulele, flute
2020	Heirloom	Crissi Cochrane	CD/LP	Soul City Music Co-op	Composer, rhythm guitars, vocals

=== Singles and EPs ===
Year	Title	Artist	Format	Label	Role
2006	The Bathroom EP	Save September	EP	Tumbleweed Entertainment	Composer, guitar, vocals
2011	Pretty Alright	Crissi Cochrane	EP	Independent	Composer, guitar, vocals
2015	"Sweet & Fine"	Crissi Cochrane	Single	Independent	Composer, guitar, vocals
2016	Santa Baby	Crissi Cochrane	EP	Independent	Vocals, guitar, engineering, production
2018^{b}	"Sleep in the Wild"	Crissi Cochrane	Single	Radiocoop (Italian release)^{b}	Composer, guitar, vocals
2020	"Hungry Love"	Crissi Cochrane	Single	Soul City Music Co-op	Composer, rhythm guitars, vocals
2020	"Can We Go Back"	Crissi Cochrane	Single	Soul City Music Co-op	Composer, vocals
2021	"Why"	Crissi Cochrane	Single	Soul City Music Co-op	Composer, vocals
2026	Fire Sign	Crissi Cochrane	EP	Soul City Music Co-op	Composer, guitar, vocals

=== Collaborations ===
Year	Title	Artist	Format	Label	Role
2011	We're All Dying to Live	Rich Aucoin	CD	Sonic Records	Vocals on "Dying to Live"
2016	i87	ZEO	Mixtape	Independent	Vocals on "Back N Forth"
2017	Phonomontage	Sarkastodon	EP	Independent	Vocals on "Aalis"
2017	"Little Love"	Benji Beach	Single	Independent	Vocals on "Little Love"
2021	"Cheap String Lights"	Brendan Scott Friel	Single	Independent	Vocals on "Cheap String Lights"
2021	Headspace	Soul Brother Mike	Album	Soul City Music Co-op	Vocals on "This Love"

== Notes ==
^a The album was released 16 November 2018 in Italy by Radiocoop under the Aldiar label.
^b The single was released 26 October 2018 in Italy by Radiocoop under the Aldiar label. The song was originally part of 2014 album Little Sway.
