= Settled Down =

Settled Down may refer to:

- "Settled Down", a song from The King of Whys (2016)
- "Settled Down", a 2015 song by Hyukoh
