= Iggy San Pablo =

Filipino musician

- Genre: Indie rock
- Occupations: Musician; singer-songwriter
- Instruments: Vocals; guitar
- Years active: 2012–present
- Label: Wide Eyed Records
- Member of: Rusty Machines; simple socks; thenils

Iggy San Pablo is a Filipino musician best known as the frontman and lead guitarist of the indie rock band Rusty Machines. In 2022, he started a solo music project called simple socks after moving to Toronto, Canada.

== Career ==
=== Rusty Machines ===
San Pablo is the frontman and lead guitarist of Rusty Machines, an indie rock band formed in 2012. The original lineup included San Pablo, guitarist Joshua Andres, bassist Leandro Fabregas, and drummer Miko Miso.

The band released its debut extended play (EP) City Lights in 2014. It later released songs including "Forget You", "Can't Hardly Wait", and "Trying Too Hard". In 2019, the band released its debut studio album Making Friends, which contains 11 tracks. Its single "Not so Fond" was released in 2023.

In 2019, San Pablo was featured in Scout magazine's music recommendations series, where he discussed songs he listened to during rainy days.

San Pablo moved to Toronto with his wife in 2022. He continued making music there while adjusting to life in a new country.

=== simple socks ===
While living in Toronto, San Pablo started simple socks, a solo project separate from Rusty Machines. Before the pandemic, he had also worked on thenils, a lo-fi music project influenced by the music of Diego Mapa and the American band the Drums.

On April 24, 2026, San Pablo released the debut single "Training Wheels", through Bandcamp, followed by its release on streaming platforms on April 27. The song is the first track from his planned debut EP Joanna Drive. "Training Wheels" is influenced by indie rock and reflects San Pablo's experience of balancing work and music while living abroad. He cited Death Cab for Cutie's The Photo Album, Into It. Over It.'s Proper, and susquatch's In This World as influences on the song.

San Pablo has said that his music deals with the demands of living as an immigrant while pursuing a music career. He also described the difficulty of communicating with audiences in Toronto because he thinks in Tagalog but often has to express himself in English. The name "simple socks" came from a phrase San Pablo and his wife used for comfortable clothes worn at home during Toronto's colder months. His songwriting has also shifted from themes of romance and young relationships to ideas about adulthood, distance, and life away from the Philippines.

=== thenils ===
Before starting simple socks, San Pablo released music under the solo project thenils (pronounced as "the nils"), which he named after his Tumblr account, where he posted covers, poems, and drafts of original songs. He released two songs under the project, "Pull" and "Empathy". "Pull" was first released on SoundCloud in 2015 and focuses on a struggling relationship.

== Discography ==
=== Extended plays ===
- City Lights (2014) — with Rusty Machines
- Joanna Drive (2026) — as simple socks

=== Albums ===
- Making Friends (2019) — with Rusty Machines

=== Selected singles ===
With Rusty Machines

- "Forget You"
- "Can't Hardly Wait"
- "Trying Too Hard"
- "Not so Fond" (2023)

As simple socks

- "Training Wheels" (2026)

==== As thenils ====
- "Pull" (2015) (Note: The song was first released on SoundCloud in 2015 and later became available on streaming platforms in 2020.)
- "Empathy" (2020)
