= The Falls of Sioux =

Studio album by Owen
- Released: April 26, 2024
- Genre: Indie folk
- Length: 40:30
- Label: Polyvinyl
- Producer: Mike Kinsella; S. Carey; Zach Hansen

Owen chronology
The Avalanche (2020)	The Falls of Sioux (2024)

The Falls of Sioux is the eleventh studio album by American musician Mike Kinsella, under the solo project Owen. It was released on April 26, 2024, under Polyvinyl Record Co.

== Reception ==
Professional ratings
Review scores
Source	Rating
AllMusic	4/5
Dork	4/5
Sputnikmusic	3.7/5

The album received a 4/5 rating from Dork, which called it "a masterclass in restraint, storytelling and embracing ennui." In a four-star review for AllMusic, Marcy Donelson referred to it as "a subtly more adventurous album," noting it "finds Kinsella's perspectives continuing to slightly shift with middle age, with his typically dry humor creeping less acerbically into his weary tales of ill-fated relationships, alcoholism, self-destructiveness, and regret." Sputnikmusic noted it as "a lovely little indie folk album," referencing its "cinematic production and chiming guitars."

== Track listing ==
The Falls of Sioux track listing
No.	Title	Length
1.	"A Reckoning"	3:59
2.	"Beacoup"	5:04
3.	"Hit and Run"	5:29
4.	"Cursed ID"	3:58
5.	"I Virtue Misspent"	3:42
6.	"Mount Cleverest"	3:49
7.	"Qui je plaisante?"	4:29
8.	"Penny"	4:58
9.	"With You Without You"	5:02

== Personnel ==
Musicians

- Mike Kinsella – drums, percussion, guitar, bass, synthesizer, vocals
- S. Carey – drums, percussion, piano, synthesizer, vocals
- Ben Lester – synthesizer, steel pedal
- Jeremy Boettcher – upright bass
- Russell Durham – strings, string arrangements
- Justine Fallon – vocals
- Cacie Dalager – vocals
- Cory Bracken – synthesizer

Production

- Mike Kinsella – producer
- S. Carey – producer
- Zach Hansen – producer, mixing, recording
- Huntley Miller – mastering
