= Football in America =

Football in America could mean:

== United States ==
- American football
  - American football in the United States
  - National Football League
- Association football
  - Soccer in the United States
  - Major League Soccer

== The Americas ==
- Association football
  - CONCACAF
    - CONCACAF Gold Cup
    - CONCACAF Champions League
  - CONMEBOL
    - Copa América
    - Copa Libertadores
  - Soccer in Canada
- Canadian football
  - Canadian Football League

== See also ==
- American (word)
- American football (disambiguation)
- Association football in America (disambiguation)
- Football in the United States (disambiguation)
- Football (word)
- Sports in the United States
- Sport in South America
