= Owen/Into It. Over It. Split EP =

EP by Owen and Into It. Over It.
- Released: August 21, 2015
- Recorded: 2015
- Genre: Indie rock
- Length: 11:00
- Label: Polyvinyl Records

Owen chronology
Other People's Songs (2014)	Owen/Into It. Over It. Split EP (2015)	Devinyl Splits No. 5 (2015)

Into It. Over It. chronology
Embracing Facts (ver 2.0) (2015)	Owen/Into It. Over It. Split EP (2015)	Standards (2016)

Owen/Into It. Over It. Split EP is a split album between Owen and Into It. Over It. This split features an original song from each band, as well as each band covering a song from the opposite artist. Into It. Over It. covers "Poor Souls," which can be found on Owen's 2002 full-length No Good For No One Now, and recreates it into an even more soft and sad song. Owen's cover of "Anchor," from Into It. Over It.'s album 52 Weeks, brings out a punky edge.

== Track listing ==
No.	Title	Music	Length
1.	"Poison Arrows"	Owen	2:39
2.	"Poor Souls" (Owen cover)	Into It. Over It.	2:54
3.	"Local Language"	Into It. Over It.	2:43
4.	"Anchor" (Into It. Over It. cover)	Owen	2:44
Total length:			11:00

== Personnel ==
Owen

- Mike Kinsella – vocals, guitar, acoustic guitar, bass, piano, drums

Into It. Over It.

- Evan Thomas Weiss – vocals, guitar, bass, keyboards
- Nick Wakim – drums

Production

- Neil Strauch – engineering, mixing
- David Downham – mastering
- Andy Hendricks – layout
- Ryan Russell- photography
