= Uncomfortably Numb =

Single by American Football featuring Hayley Williams

from the album American Football (LP3)
- Released: January 22, 2019
- Genre: Midwest emo; dream pop; math rock
- Length: 4:10
- Label: Polyvinyl; Big Scary Monsters
- Songwriter: American Football
- Producer: Jason Cupp

American Football singles chronology
"Silhouettes" (2018)	"Uncomfortably Numb" (2019)	"Every Wave to Ever Rise" (2019)

Music video
- "Uncomfortably Numb" on YouTube

"Uncomfortably Numb" is a song by the American emo band American Football. It was released on January 22, 2019, as the second single from their third self-titled album.

The track features Mike Kinsella and Paramore vocalist Hayley Williams alternating verses of a narrative. This collaboration marks a radical change in the band's sound from their mathy emo roots to a dreamier, more atmospheric sound with lyrical maturation and noticeably refined production quality.

The song has received critical acclaim and is considered an album highlight.

Alongside the song, a music video was also released which follows the narrative of the song and stars former Workaholics star Blake Anderson and pro skater Paul Rodriguez.

== Personnel ==
Personnel taken from American Football liner notes.

American Football

- Steve Holmes
- Mike Kinsella
- Nate Kinsella
- Steve Lamos

Additional musicians

- Hayley Williams – additional vocals
- Kristina Dutton – violin and violin arrangements

== Charts ==
Chart (2020)	Peak position
LyricFind U.S. (Billboard)	15
