= Never Meant =

Song by American Football

from the album American Football
- Released: September 14, 1999
- Recorded: May 1999
- Genre: Midwest emo; math rock
- Length: 4:28
- Label: Polyvinyl
- Songwriter: American Football
- Producer: Brendan Gamble

"Never Meant" is a song by American emo band American Football. The opening track on the band's eponymous 1999 debut LP, it is considered to be one of the greatest emo songs of all time.

Variety characterized the track as "evoking a particularly depressing type of nostalgia."

== Release ==
American Football's self-titled debut album was released on Polyvinyl Record Co. on September 14, 1999. Fans of the band were mostly fans of Cap'n Jazz, a short-lived emo band that included American Football singer Mike Kinsella on drums. When American Football released, most of the band members had to move back home from college. The band then disbanded after recording the album. In later years, the album, with the help of word-of-mouth, gained cult status since its release.

== Reception ==
"Never Meant" has been critically acclaimed, with Variety and Vulture both ranking "Never Meant" as the greatest emo song of all time, with American pop culture website The Ringer ranking it as the greatest emo song of 1999.

== Music videos ==
On June 5, 2014, a music video was released for "Never Meant". Directed by Chris Strong, the video was filmed inside and around the house that features on the album cover artwork. The video was set in Urbana, Illinois, around 1999. Strong revealed that the storyline was "about a brief relationship occurring between two characters at the end of their college experience". In December, a live video was released for "Never Meant", filmed in October at New York's Webster Hall.

== Personnel ==
Adapted from the liner notes.

American Football

- Steve Holmes – guitar
- Steve Lamos – drums, tambourine
- Mike Kinsella – vocals, guitar

Technical personnel

- Brendan Gamble – recording
