= Intersections (Into It. Over It. album) =

Studio album by Into It. Over It.
- Released: September 24, 2013
- Recorded: 2013 at Soma Electronic Music Studios
- Genre: Emo
- Length: 46:03
- Label: Triple Crown Records
- Producer: Brian Deck

Into It. Over It. chronology
Proper (2011)	Intersections (2013)	Standards (2016)

Professional ratings
Review scores
Source	Rating
Alternative Press	4/5 stars
Pitchfork	7.1/10
Punknews.org	4/5 stars

Intersections is the second studio album by the Chicago-based singer-songwriter Evan Thomas Weiss, known as Into It. Over It. Rolling Stone listed the album 38th on the "40 Greatest Emo Albums of All-time" list.

== Critical reception ==
The Chicago Reader called the album "lush and lovely," writing that Weiss "keeps finding new ways to express himself within an idiom that’s already been declared dead several times."

== Track listing ==
All music is composed by Into It. Over It.

No.	Title	Length
1.	"New North-Side Air"	3:12
2.	"Spinning Thread"	3:11
3.	"A Curse Worth Believing"	4:42
4.	"Spatial Exploration"	3:15
5.	"Favor Fiction"	2:31
6.	"The Shaking of Leaves"	3:27
7.	"Upstate Blues"	4:27
8.	"No Amount of Sound"	3:37
9.	"A Pair of Matching Taxi Rides"	3:59
10.	"Obsessive Compulsive Distraction"	3:33
11.	"Your Antique Organ"	2:52
12.	"Contractual Obligation"	6:50
Total length:		46:03

Japanese edition
No.	Title	Length
13.	"A Curse Worth Believing (demo)"	3:10
14.	"A Ghost on the East Coast (The One AM Radio cover)"	2:16
Total length:		51:29

== Personnel ==
Into It. Over It.

- Evan Thomas Weiss – vocals, guitar, bass, other instruments

Additional personnel

- Nick Wakim – Drums
