= The Avalanche (Owen album) =

Studio album by Owen
- Released: June 19, 2020
- Length: 44:54
- Producer: S. Carey

Owen chronology
The King of Whys (2016)	The Avalanche (2020)	The Falls of Sioux (2024)

Professional ratings
Aggregate scores
Source	Rating
Metacritic	83/100
Review scores
Source	Rating
AllMusic	4/5 stars
Beats Per Minute	79%
Exclaim!	7/10
The Line of Best Fit	8.5/10
MusicOMH	4/5 stars

The Avalanche is the tenth studio album by American musician Mike Kinsella, under the solo project Owen. It was released on June 19, 2020 under Polyvinyl Record Co.

== Release ==
On May 7, 2020, Kinsella announced the release of the album, alongside the first track "A New Muse". The second single "On With The Show" was released on May 28, 2020.

== Critical reception ==
The Avalanche was met with "universal acclaim" reviews from critics. At Metacritic, which assigns a weighted average rating out of 100 to reviews from mainstream publications, this release received an average score of 83, based on 7 reviews. Aggregator Album of the Year gave the album 79 out of 100 based on a critical consensus of 7 reviews.

== Track listing ==
The Avalanche track listing
No.	Title	Length
1.	"A New Muse"	5:18
2.	"Dead For Days"	5:30
3.	"On With The Show"	4:10
4.	"The Contours"	5:58
5.	"I Should've Known"	3:37
6.	"Mom and Dead" (featuring KC Dalager)	5:31
7.	"Headphoned"	4:29
8.	"Wanting and Willing"	4:22
9.	"I Go, Ego" (featuring KC Dalager)	5:59
