= American Football (2016 album) =

Second studio album by American Football

Studio album by American Football
- Released: October 21, 2016
- Recorded: April 2016
- Studios: ARC Studios, Omaha, Nebraska; SHIRK Studios, Chicago, Illinois
- Genres: Emo; indie rock
- Length: 37:58
- Labels: Polyvinyl; Wichita
- Producers: American Football, Jason Cupp

American Football chronology
American Football (1999)	American Football (2016)	American Football (2019)

Singles from American Football
- 1. "Desire Gets in the Way" Released: October 5, 2016

American Football (also known as LP2) is the second studio album by American rock band American Football, released on October 21, 2016, through Polyvinyl in the US, and Wichita Recordings in the UK and Japan. It was the band's first release since their debut album American Football in September 1999 and disbandment in 2000. In April 2014, American Football announced they would be reforming after fifteen years for a number of live performances, playing shows through the year and into 2015. In early 2016, American Football began recording the second album with Jason Cupp at ARC Studios in Omaha, Nebraska, and at SHIRK Studios in Chicago, Illinois. This is their first album to featured as a quartet, following the addition of Mike Kinsella's cousin, Nate, on bass guitar.

== Background ==
American Football released their debut self-titled album in September 1999 through Polyvinyl. The band broke up due to the members no longer living in the same city and their college courses coming to an end. Vocalist/guitarist Mike Kinsella said that they "never had any ambitious goals. [...] we weren't kids who wanted to [...] tour all summer." Kinsella and guitarist Steve Holmes both moved to Chicago and remained in contact at first. Meanwhile, drummer Steve Lamos moved to Colorado, later becoming a professor. Kinsella wanted to form a new group where he had full creative control, eventually creating the project Owen.

In April 2014 American Football announced they were reuniting for live performances. Holmes said the group realized that "the time was ripe for three middle aged dudes to play some old songs about teenage feelings, and stand around tuning guitars for a long time." American Football, with the addition of Kinsella's cousin Nate playing bass, played a surprise show in August in Chicago. They then followed this up with playing a festival in September, then three shows in New York. Further dates running into December were also played, as well as the band's first UK shows the following May.

The album's cover artwork depicts the interior of the American Football House, the same house featured on the cover of the band's 1999 debut album.

== Composition ==
American Football is an emo and indie rock album; the majority of the group's songs are created from Kinsella and Holmes' intertwining guitar parts. Kinsella described "Give Me the Gun" as "just me checking in on a distressed loved one done in my best Bernard Sumner impersonation".

== Recording ==
The album was recorded in April 2016 at ARC Studios, located in Omaha, Nebraska, and SHIRK Studios, located in Chicago, Illinois. Production duties were handled by the group and Jason Cupp.

== Release ==
On August 23, 2016, the band's second self-titled album was announced for release. On the same day, "I've Been So Lost for So Long" was made available for streaming, and the album's cover art and track listing was revealed. On September 7, "Give Me the Gun" was made available for streaming. "Desire Gets in the Way" was released to radio on October 5. American Football was released on October 21 through Polyvinyl in the U.S. and through Wichita in Europe. The group performed a series of release shows in Chicago, New York, Los Angeles and London. The cover of the album was the interior of the same house as featured on their eponymous debut album or best known as "American Football house".

== Reception ==
Professional ratings
Aggregate scores
Source	Rating
AnyDecentMusic?	7.4/10
Metacritic	78/100
Review scores
Source	Rating
AllMusic	4/5 stars
Clash	8/10
Consequence of Sound	B+
DIY	3/5 stars
Drowned in Sound	10/10
Exclaim!	9/10
The Guardian	4/5 stars
MusicOMH	4/5 stars
Pitchfork	7.7/10
The Skinny	4/5 stars

American Football received positive reviews from critics. Review aggregation website Metacritic assigned a normalized score of 78/100, indicating "generally favorable reviews", based on 19 critic reviews.

=== Accolades ===
Publication	Accolade	Year	Rank
The Skinny	Top 50 Albums of 2016	2016	45

== Track listing ==
All tracks are written by American Football.

American Football track listing
No.	Title	Length
1.	"Where Are We Now?"	4:44
2.	"My Instincts Are the Enemy"	4:49
3.	"Home Is Where the Haunt Is"	3:26
4.	"Born to Lose"	4:54
5.	"I've Been So Lost for So Long"	4:36
6.	"Give Me the Gun"	3:24
7.	"I Need a Drink (Or Two or Three)"	4:58
8.	"Desire Gets in the Way"	3:28
9.	"Everyone Is Dressed Up"	3:39
Total length:		37:58

Japanese bonus tracks
No.	Title	Length
10.	"Letters & Packages" (live in Tokyo)	3:36
11.	"You Know I Should Be Leaving Soon" (live in Tokyo)	4:26

== Personnel ==
Personnel taken from American Football liner notes.

American Football

- Steve Holmes
- Mike Kinsella
- Nate Kinsella
- Steve Lamos

Technical personnel

- American Football – production
- Jason Cupp – production, engineering, mixing
- Greg Calbi – mastering

== Charts ==
Chart performance for American Football
Chart (2016)	Peak position
Scottish Albums (Official Charts)	71
UK Album Sales (OCC)	83
UK Independent Albums (Official Charts)	17
UK Independent Album Breakers (OCC)	2
UK Physical Albums (OCC)	71
UK Record Store Chart (OCC)	8
UK Vinyl Albums Chart (OCC)	2
US Billboard 200	82
US Top Rock Albums (Billboard)	14
US Vinyl Albums (Billboard)	1
