= (The EP) =

(the ep)

EP by Owen
- Released: May 4, 2004
- Recorded: Chicago, USA
- Genre: Rock
- Length: 23:22
- Label: Polyvinyl

Owen chronology
The Rutabega / Owen (2004)	(the ep) (2004)	I Do Perceive (2004)

Professional ratings
Review scores
Source	Rating
AllMusic	3.5/5 stars
Punknews.org	4/5 stars

(the ep) is an EP, the third release by Mike Kinsella under the name Owen. It was released on May 4, 2004, on Polyvinyl Records. On April 17, 2004, "In the Morning, Before Work" was made available for download.

== Track listing ==
No.	Title	Length
1.	"Skin and Bones"	4:40
2.	"In the Morning, Before Work"	3:35
3.	"Breaking Away"	3:22
4.	"That Mouth"	6:45
5.	"Gazebo"	4:58
Total length:		23:22

== Guest musicians ==
- Cale Parks on vibraphone
- Bob Hoffnar on pedal steel
- Jen Tabor on cello and violin
- Paul Koob on vioobrophone [sic] (vibraphone) and violoncello

== Vinyl pressing ==
In addition to being released on by Polyvinyl Records, it was also pressed on translucent yellow vinyl by Mi Amante Records.
