= North American Indoor Football League =

The North American Indoor Football League is the name of several different indoor football leagues:

- North American Indoor Football League (2005) was a proposed Canadian indoor football league.
- North American Indoor Football League (2007) was a planned American indoor football league.
- North American Indoor Football is an American indoor football league established in 2015.
