= Ghost Town (Owen album) =

Studio album by Owen
- Released: November 8, 2011
- Genre: Indie rock
- Length: 40:37
- Label: Polyvinyl
- Producer: Brian Deck; Neil Strauch

Owen chronology
New Leaves (2009)	Ghost Town (2011)	L'Ami du Peuple (2013)

Professional ratings
Aggregate scores
Source	Rating
Metacritic	(70/100) link
Review scores
Source	Rating
Absolutepunk	(8.6/10) link
Allmusic	link
The A.V. Club	(B−) link
The Line of Best Fit	link
PopMatters	link
PunkNews	link
SputnikMusic	(4.5/5) link
The 405	(7.5/10) link

Ghost Town is the sixth full-length album by Chicago musician Mike Kinsella under the moniker Owen. It was released on November 8, 2011 to mostly positive reviews.

== Development ==
Kinsella has stated in interviews that the album was composed over the course of about two years, with the early drum work beginning while he was on tour with a reunited Cap'n Jazz in 2010. Sources of inspiration for the record included his first experiences as a father, exploring his old home and defending his beliefs.

== Track listing ==
No.	Title	Length
1.	"Too Many Moons"	4:46
2.	"No Place Like Home"	4:43
3.	"O, Evelyn"	2:56
4.	"I Believe"	6:11
5.	"The Armoire"	4:13
6.	"An Animal"	4:36
7.	"No Language"	4:09
8.	"Mother's Milk Breath"	5:03
9.	"Everyone's Asleep in the House but Me"	4:00
Total length:		40:37
