= At Home with Owen =

Studio album by Owen
- Released: November 7, 2006
- Studio: Semaphore Recording, Chicago, Illinois
- Genre: Indie folk
- Length: 37:40
- Label: Polyvinyl Records, Hobbledehoy Record Co.

Owen chronology
I Do Perceive (2004)	At Home with Owen (2006)	Owen/The City on Film Split 7" (2007)

Professional ratings
Review scores
Source	Rating
Absolutepunk	(8.5/10) link
Allmusic	3.5/5 stars
PopMatters	link
Ultimate-Guitar.com	(7.7/10) link

At Home with Owen is the fourth studio album by American musician Mike Kinsella under the name Owen, released on November 7, 2006, through Polyvinyl Records.

== Release ==
At Home with Owen was released on November 7, 2006, on Polyvinyl Records. In November and December, Owen went on a US tour alongside Copeland, The Appleseed Cast and Acute. The music video for "One of These Days" premiered through Polyvinyl's vodcast on December 6, 2006. In January 2007, Kinsella toured Japan with Make Believe; in March and April 2007, he went on a US tour with Rocky Votolato and Drag the River. In October 2007, Owen went on a US tour with Kevin Devine and Andy Hull. They ended the year with a short, three-date East Coast tour in December 2007.

== Track listing ==
No.	Title	Length
1.	"Bad News"	6:30
2.	"The Sad Waltzes of Pietro Crespi"	3:13
3.	"Bags of Bones"	3:52
4.	"Use Your Words"	4:27
5.	"A Bird in Hand"	7:33
6.	"Windows and Doorways"	4:47
7.	"Femme Fatale"	3:34
8.	"One of These Days"	3:44
Total length:		37:40

Japan Bonus Track
No.	Title	Length
9.	"A Fever"	3:13
10.	"Stolen Bike"	4:51
Total length:		45:44

== Personnel ==
- Mike Kinsella - guitar, vocals

Guest musicians

- Kristina Dutton - violin
- Andy Rader - upright bass
- Jamie Burns - vocals
- Gillian Lisee - vocals

== Trivia ==
- "Femme Fatale" is a cover of The Velvet Underground song with the same name from the album The Velvet Underground & Nico.
- "Stolen Bike" is a cover of the Bruce Springsteen song "Stolen Car" from the album "The River".
- "Pietro Crespi" from the song "The Sad Waltzes of Pietro Crespi" is a reference to Mike's car, named after the character from the novel One Hundred Years of Solitude by Colombian novelist Gabriel García Márquez.
