= American Football (2019 album) =

Third studio album by American Football

Studio album by American Football
- Released: March 22, 2019
- Studios: ARC Studios, Omaha, Nebraska
- Genres: Emo; post-rock; math rock; dream pop; slowcore
- Length: 47:16
- Labels: Polyvinyl; Big Scary Monsters
- Producer: Jason Cupp

American Football chronology
| American Football (2016) | American Football (2019) | Year One Demos (2019) |

American Football studio chronology
| American Football (2016) | American Football (2019) | American Football (2026) |

Singles from American Football
- 1. "Silhouettes" Released: December 11, 2018; 2. "Uncomfortably Numb" Released: January 22, 2019; 3. "Every Wave to Ever Rise" Released: February 28, 2019

American Football (also known as LP3) is the third studio album by American rock band American Football, released on March 22, 2019, through Polyvinyl worldwide, and Big Scary Monsters in European territories.

American Football is the third self-titled album by American Football and the second release since their reunion in 2014.

== Background ==
On December 11, 2018, the first single from the album, "Silhouettes", was released, along with the band teasing a third project on Instagram, and the listing for a third self-titled album appearing on Apple Music. A music video for "Silhouettes" was released on January 8, 2019. Later that month, the band released a new single, "Uncomfortably Numb", which references the similarly titled song by Pink Floyd and features vocals from Paramore vocalist Hayley Williams. It was released with an accompanying music video, starring former Workaholics star Blake Anderson and pro skater Paul Rodriguez. This is their first album to not feature the American Football House on its cover, as their first two albums did.

== Composition ==
Musically, LP3 has been primarily described as emo, post-rock, math rock, dream pop, and slowcore, while also including elements of shoegaze.

== Reception ==
Professional ratings
Aggregate scores
| Source | Rating |
|---|---|
| AnyDecentMusic? | 7.6/10 |
| Metacritic | 80/100 |
Review scores
| Source | Rating |
| AllMusic | 3.5/5 stars |
| Consequence of Sound | B+ |
| DIY | 4/5 stars |
| Drowned in Sound | 9/10 |
| Exclaim! | 8/10 |
| NME | 4/5 stars |
| Pitchfork | 8.1/10 |
| Q | 3/5 stars |
| The Skinny | 4/5 stars |
| Under the Radar | 8/10 |

American Football was met with critical acclaim. At Metacritic, which assigns a normalized rating out of 100 to reviews from mainstream publications, the album received an average score of 80, based on 14 reviews.

== Track listing ==
All tracks are written by American Football.

American Football track listing
| No. | Title | Length |
|---|---|---|
| 1. | "Silhouettes" | 7:21 |
| 2. | "Every Wave to Ever Rise" (featuring Elizabeth Powell) | 5:54 |
| 3. | "Uncomfortably Numb" (featuring Hayley Williams) | 4:10 |
| 4. | "Heir Apparent" | 5:53 |
| 5. | "Doom in Full Bloom" | 7:48 |
| 6. | "I Can't Feel You" (featuring Rachel Goswell) | 4:47 |
| 7. | "Mine to Miss" | 5:23 |
| 8. | "Life Support" | 5:57 |
| Total length: | | 47:16 |

== Personnel ==
Personnel taken from American Football liner notes.

American Football

- Steve Holmes
- Mike Kinsella
- Nate Kinsella
- Steve Lamos

Additional musicians

- Elizabeth Powell – additional vocals on "Every Wave to Ever Rise"
- Hayley Williams – additional vocals on "Uncomfortably Numb"
- Rachel Goswell – additional vocals on "I Can't Feel You"
- Kristin Dennis – additional vocals on "Silhouettes", "I Can't Feel You", and "Mine to Miss"
- Kristina Dutton – violin and violin arrangements on "Silhouettes", "Uncomfortably Numb", and "Life Support"
- Mic Vredenburgh – cello on "Life Support"
- Amanda Stevenson – background vocals on "Heir Apparent"
- Omaha Children's Choir – background vocals on "Heir Apparent"

Technical personnel

- Jason "Jake" Cupp – production, engineering, and mixing
- J. Andrew Shropshire – additional vocal engineering on "Every Wave to Ever Rise"
- Steve Clarke – additional vocal engineering on "I Can't Feel You"
- Adria Otte – violin engineering
- Dave Kutch – mastering

== Charts ==
Chart performance for American Football
| Chart (2019) | Peak position |
|---|---|
| Scottish Albums (Official Charts) | 38 |
| UK Album Sales (OCC) | 51 |
| UK Album Downloads (Official Charts) | 93 |
| UK Independent Albums (Official Charts) | 17 |
| UK Physical Albums (OCC) | 48 |
| US Independent Albums (Billboard) | 4 |
| US Indie Store Album Sales (Billboard) | 9 |
| US Top Album Sales (Billboard) | 17 |
| US Top Alternative Albums (Billboard) | 22 |
| US Top Rock Albums (Billboard) | 45 |
| US Vinyl Albums (Billboard) | 2 |
