= The King of Whys =

Studio album by Owen
- Released: July 29, 2016
- Studio: April Base Studios (Eau Claire, WI); Shirk Studios
- Genre: Indie rock
- Length: 38:54
- Label: Polyvinyl
- Producer: Sean Carey

Owen chronology
Other People's Songs (2014)	The King of Whys (2016)	The Avalanche (2020)

The King of Whys is the ninth studio album by American musician Mike Kinsella's solo project Owen. It was released on July 29, 2016 via Polyvinyl Record Co. Recording sessions took place at April Base Studios in Eau Claire with additional recording at Shirk Studios. It features contributions from Benjamin Lester, Jeremy Boettcher, Mike Noyce, Andy Hofer, and Sean Carey, who also produced the album.

== Critical reception ==
Professional ratings
Aggregate scores
Source	Rating
AnyDecentMusic?	7.1/10
Metacritic	79/100
Review scores
Source	Rating
AllMusic	3.5/5 stars
Clash	7/10
Consequence of Sound	B
DIY	3/5 stars
Dork	4/5 stars
Drowned in Sound	7/10
Exclaim!	8/10
Pitchfork	7.2/10
The A.V. Club	B+
The Skinny	4/5 stars

The King of Whys was met with generally favorable reviews from music critics. At Metacritic, which assigns a normalized rating out of 100 to reviews from mainstream publications, the album received an average score of 79 based on thirteen reviews. The aggregator AnyDecentMusic? has the critical consensus of the album at a 7.1 out of 10, based on fourteen reviews.

David Anthony of The A.V. Club praised the album, declaring "with The King Of Whys, Kinsella unites Owen's disparate wanderings, creating a record that's his most varied, in both music and lyrics". Ali Shutler of Dork described the album "as beautiful and haunting as you'd expect, Owen still finds space to surprise". Adam Feibel of Exclaim! noted that the album is "wrought with restless artistry, simultaneously looking for and finding emotional release through musical exploration, lyrical introspection and bits of dry humour". Will Fitzpatrick of The Skinny has finished his review, resuming: "warmly mature yet never dull, this is a rare treat". Collin Brennan of Consequence wrote: "Owen remains as confessional as ever, lingering on life's uncomfortable questions in a way that reads like emo for people who grew out of emo 20 years ago". Ian Cohen of Pitchfork stated: "whether or not Kinsella can actually remember his teenage feelings, The King of Whys proves that he can still experience them". AllMusic's Marcy Donelson wrote: "there isn't a single solo acoustic-guitar ballad in the set, but even with the ramped-up accompaniment, The King of Whys is still more intimate than any of Kinsella's prior bands, like American Football or Owls, or even Joan of Arc", calling it "an affecting and worthwhile effort from an artist who's as reliably tuneful as candid". Will Butler of Clash reported that the album is "void of any bad songs and has an abundance of gravitas". Adam Turner-Heffer of Drowned in Sound claimed: "although there is nothing world-beating here, Kinsella ... may well have struck a formula that propels his Owen project into the stratosphere of other highly regarded midwest-American contemporaries Bon Iver, Sufjan Stevens or Tallest Man on Earth".

In his mixed review for DIY, Will Richards summed up: "the result is a consistently textured record, with beautifully integrated strings".

== Track listing ==
All tracks are written by Mike Kinsella.

No.	Title	Length
1.	"Empty Bottle"	4:27
2.	"The Desperate Act"	3:33
3.	"Settled Down"	3:17
4.	"Lovers Come and Go"	4:37
5.	"Tourniquet"	4:14
6.	"A Burning Soul"	3:30
7.	"Saltwater"	2:54
8.	"An Island"	4:12
9.	"Sleep Is a Myth"	4:27
10.	"Lost"	3:43
Total length:		38:54

== Personnel ==
- Mike Kinsella – songwriter
- Sean Carey – voice, piano, drums, producer
- Michael Noyce – voice, viola
- Ben Lester – pedal steel, synth
- Jeremy Boettcher – upright bass
- Andy Hofer – trombone
- Zach Hanson – engineering, mixing
- Neil Strauch – additional recording
- Huntley Miller – mastering
- Paul Kooby – design
- Melina Ausikaitis – illustration
