= Football in the United States =

Football in the United States may refer to:

- American football, sport
- American football in the United States, sport in the country
- Australian rules football in the United States
- Gaelic football in the United States
- Rugby league in the United States
- Rugby union in the United States
- Soccer in the United States, association football
