= No Good for No One Now =

Studio album by Owen
- Released: November 19, 2002
- Genre: Indie rock, emo
- Length: 40:24
- Label: Polyvinyl

Owen chronology
Owen (2001)	No Good for No One Now (2002)	The Rutabega / Owen (2004)

Professional ratings
Review scores
Source	Rating
AllMusic	4/5 stars
LAS Magazine	Unfavorable
Punknews.org	3/5 stars

No Good for No One Now is the second studio album by Owen released on November 19, 2002. The album was recorded in Mike Kinsella's old bedroom at his mom's house. The cover art is a painting by Charlot Byj. "The Ghost of What Should've Been" was posted on the label's website on November 15, ahead of the album's release. On November 20, the album was made available for streaming via an e-card. In January and February 2003, Owen appeared on the Polyvinyl Winter Tour alongside Rainer Maria and Mates of State. In October and November, Owen toured across the US with Maritime, the Weakerthans and Mico.

== Track listing ==
No.	Title	Length
1.	"Nobody's Nothing"	5:20
2.	"Everyone Feels Like You"	7:01
3.	"Poor Souls"	5:30
4.	"The Ghost of What Should've Been"	5:08
5.	"Good Deeds"	3:25
6.	"I'm Not Going Anywhere Tonight"	3:51
7.	"Take Care of Yourself"	10:10
Total length:		40:24
