= Into It. Over It. =

Indie rock band

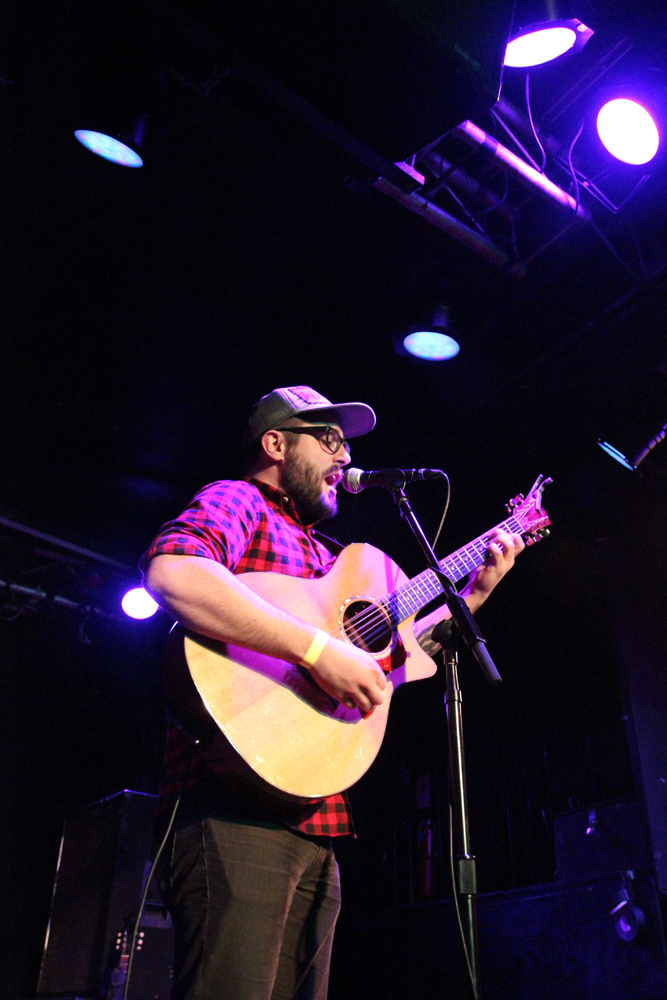
- Evan Weiss performing live in January 2013

Background information
- Origin: Chicago, Illinois, U.S.
- Genres: Emo; indie rock
- Years active: 2007–present
- Labels: Triple Crown; No Sleep; Topshelf; Big Scary Monsters; Storm Chasers
- Spinoffs: Recreational Drugs; Stay Ahead of the Weather
- Spinoff of: The Progress
- Members: Evan Weiss; Matt Frank; Joe George; Adam Beck
- Website: intoitoverit.com

Into It. Over It. is an indie rock band founded in 2007 as the solo project of Chicago, Illinois-based musician Evan Thomas Weiss. It is a leading act of the early-2010s emo revival scene.

== History ==
Evan Weiss grew up in Cherry Hill, New Jersey. His first exposure to emo was hearing the band Sunny Day Real Estate in the seventh grade while browsing a record shop. He continued his interest in music by buying Jade Tree and Polyvinyl recordings and going to local shows in Philadelphia. In the fourth or fifth grade, Weiss started the band J.A.R. with school friends; it eventually became The Progress and garnered modest local success. The Progress released an album and two EPs before breaking up in 2008. The Progress later reunited sporadically to perform one-off live shows. However, Weiss could not convince his bandmates to play in the band full-time.

Weiss started a solo project under the moniker Into It. Over It. He first released music through two unorthodox concept projects: 52 Weeks and Twelve Towns. 52 Weeks involved writing, recording, and releasing one song every week for a year; it was later released as a compilation. Twelve Towns was a 12-song project released over six separate splits with several different bands, each song was named after a town. In May 2011, Into It. Over It. made an appearance at Bled Fest.

The band released a split EP with Castevet titled Snack Town on Topshelf Records. The 7" vinyl version was released on July 28, 2010, while the digital edition came out on August 14, 2010. Into It. Over It. and Castevet then embarked on six-date tour together, spanning from June 29 to July 4, 2010.

In June, Weiss released Into It. Over It.'s first studio album, Proper on No Sleep Records, which was produced by Ed Rose. In November and December 2011, Into It. Over It. supported The Swellers on their European tour. In March and April 2012, Into It. Over It. supported The Wonder Years on the Glamour Kills Spring 2012 tour in the United States. To promote the tour, the bands released a compilation showcasing the bands covering each others' songs. Into It. Over It.'s contribution was a cover of The Wonder Years's track "Don't Let Me Cave In". This was followed up in 2013 with Intersections, released on Triple Crown Records and on Big Scary Monsters in UK/Europe.

In January 2015, Weiss and touring drummer Josh Sparks lived for a month in a secluded cabin in Craftsbury, Vermont where they wrote the third Into It. Over It. album. Built for the specific purpose of allowing musicians to work in isolation, Weiss said of the location: "We were an hour from the nearest gas station, an hour from the nearest grocery store. Isolated, 4ft of snow on the ground, and negative 20 degrees outside. The whole thing was run on solar or generator power, so no phone, no internet." He and Sparks spent thirteen hours a day writing music.

Weiss undertook a solo tour with Kevin Devine and Laura Stevenson, a stint in the UK with Modern Baseball, and several spring support dates for Minus the Bear. After more than 250 shows in fifteen counties since 2013, Weiss wrapped up touring. He began recording the band's third studio album, Intersections, with John Vanderslice. Weiss and Sparks entered Vanderslice's Tiny Telephone Studios in June to record. Weiss recalled: "We couldn't sweat the small stuff, you're not able to go in and tweak or micromanage little sections of the music. It helped me accept chaos in a way I couldn't before."

After Weiss completed a tour with his side project Pet Symmetry in support of Dan Andriano in the Emergency Room and Jeff Rosenstock, Into It. Over It. continued to play shows until the end of 2015. Notable dates included Riot Fest Chicago, The Promise Ring's New Year's Eve reunion show, Weiss's solo set at The Fest, a tour in support of The Get Up Kids in December.

Into It. Over It. promoted their third album Standards through an article on SPIN, a teaser on their Facebook page, and an interview with Noisey that was accompanied by a stream of the song "No EQ". Standards was released on March 11, 2016, through Triple Crown Records. March through May, the band toured the United States in support of the album alongside The World Is a Beautiful Place & I Am No Longer Afraid to Die.

== Related acts ==
Weiss played in numerous bands from Chicago and South Jersey. He currently fronts Pet Symmetry with Erik Czaja and Marcus Nuccio of the emo band Dowsing. He also fronted Their / They're / There alongside Mike Kinsella of Owen and Matthew Frank of Loose Lips Sink Ships. He plays bass in both bands despite having gained notoriety as a guitarist in Into. It Over It. Bass was the first instrument he learned and is what he usually plays.

He was previously a member of Damiera and Up Up Down Down Left Right Left Right B A Start. He also played in smaller bands during his teens and early twenties years including Labour, Map the Growth, Günna Vähm, The Funeral Bird, Hiroshima Mon'Amour, Sleeper Agents, Emergency! and The Progress

In 2015, Into. It Over It.'s current drummer Josh Sparks and Evan Weiss' Their / They're / There bandmate Matthew Frank announced that they had formed a side project called Recreational Drugs, subsequently signing to Count Your Lucky Stars Records to release their debut self-titled EP. Sparks later left the band.

The original members of Into It. Over It.'s live band formed Stay Ahead of the Weather. They released an EP in 2010 and a split with The Wonder Years.

== Members ==
- Evan Thomas Weiss – vocals, guitar, bass, other instruments (2011–present)
- Matt Frank – bass (2019–present)
- Joe George – guitar (2019–present)
- Adam Beck – drums (2017–present)

=== Touring members ===
- Joshua David Sparks – drums (live, 2013–2017; session, 2015–2017)
- Josh Parks – guitar (2013–2017)
- Rodrigo Palma – bass (2015–2017)
- Nick Wakim – drums (live, 2012–2013; session, 2011–2013)
- Matt Jordan – guitar (2012–2013)
- Owen Mallon – bass (2012–2013)
- Tim Mortensen – bass (2013–2015)
- Randy Reddell – bass (2015)

== Discography ==
=== Studio albums ===
- Proper (2011)
- Intersections (2013)
- Standards (2016)
- Figure (2020)
- 15 Years (2023)
- Interesting Decisions: Into It. Over It. Songs (2020-2023) (2024)

=== EPs ===
- Snug EP (2011)
- Life Is Suffering (2013)
- Home Is The Gift b/w I Want An Alien For Christmas (2020)

=== Compilations ===
- 52 Weeks (2009)
- Twelve Towns (2011)

=== Split releases ===
- Diner State, Vol. 2 single (with The Prestige) (2008)
- IIOI/KOJI LP (with Koji) (2010)
- Split EP with Empire! Empire! (I Was a Lonely Estate) (2010)
- Split EP with Bob Nanna and Lauren Lo (2010)
- Split EP with Everyone Everywhere (2010)
- Split EP with Pswingset (2010)
- Snack Town split EP with CSTVT (2010)
- Split EP with Such Gold (2011)
- Scott & Aubrey Wedding 7-inch EP (with The Forecast, The Swellers and Bomb the Music Industry!) (2012)
- Fest 11 Split EP (with Misser, State Lines and You Blew It!) (2012)
- Split EP with The Great Albatross (2013)
- Daytrotter Presents No. 12 LP (with Daniel Johnston) (2013)
- Split EP with Owen (2015)
- Reciprocity Split EP with Hikes (2022)
- Split EP with Malegoat (2022)

=== Miscellaneous ===
- Covers Cassette (2010)
- Tour EP (2010)
- Chicago Cassette (2011)
- Daytrotter Session (2011)
- Daytrotter Session (2012)
- Polyvinyl 4-Track Singles Series single (2014)
- Keep In Touch: June 2015 flexi-postcard 7" (2015)
- Daytrotter Session (2015)
- Session #2 on Audiotree Live (2016)
- STORM010 (2020)
- Canada Sessions (2020)
- Standards B-Sides (2020)

=== Compilation appearances ===
- Arbor Christmas: Volume 8 (Arbor Christmas Collections), "30 Ft. Spirit", "Assassination on X-Mas Eve" (Archers of Loaf cover) (2007)
- Arbor Christmas: Volume 9 (Arbor Christmas Collections), "Freezin'; Turnup Thermometerdrive" (2008)
- No Sleep 'Till Christmas (No Sleep Records), "Jingle Bell Broke" (2008)
- No Sleep 'Till Christmas 2 (No Sleep Records), "Westmont, NJ" (2009)
- Arbor Christmas: Volume 11 (Arbor Christmas Collections), "For Agnes" (2010)
- No Sleep 'Till Christmas 3 (No Sleep Records), "For Agnes" (2010)
- Xtra Mile High Club, Vol. 3 (Xtra Mile Recordings), "The Bullied Becomes the Bully (live on WKDU)" (2011)
- A Tribute to Alkaline Trio (Pacific Ridge Records), "Message to Kathlene" (Alkaline Trio cover) (2011)
- Fuck Off All Nerds: A Benefit Compilation in Memory of Mitch Dubey (Topshelf), "Bustin'", "Raw Bar OBX 2002"
- Glamour Kills Tour, "Don't Let Me Cave In"
- Arbor Christmas: Volume 13 (Arbor Christmas Collections), "A Curse Worth Believing (demo)" (2012)
- A Comp for Mom (No Sleep Records), "For Agnes" (2014)
- While No One Was Looking: Toasting 20 Years of Bloodshot Records (Bloodshot Records), "Deep Red Bells" (Neko Case cover) (2015)
- Polyvinyl 4-Track Singles Series Vol. 1 (Polyvinyl Records), "Arsenic" (2015)
- Our First 100 Days, "Bergen-Belsen, Nov 8th 2016" (2017)
- Earbudz Volume One (No Earbuds), "Get Lost (Queen of Jeans)" (2021)
- Silence Is A Dangerous Sound: A Tribute To Fugazi (Ripcord), "Instrument" (2021)
