= New Leaves =

Studio album by Owen
- Released: September 22, 2009
- Genre: Indie rock
- Length: 38:38
- Label: Polyvinyl, Hobbledehoy
- Producer: Brian Deck

Owen chronology
The Seaside EP (2009)	New Leaves (2009)	Ghost Town (2011)

Professional ratings
Aggregate scores
Source	Rating
Metacritic	81/100
Review scores
Source	Rating
AllMusic	4/5 stars
Alternative Press	4/5 stars
The A.V. Club	A−
Billboard	4.5/5 stars
Filter	76%
Sputnikmusic	4/5
The 405	9/10

New Leaves is the fifth studio album by Chicago artist Mike Kinsella under the name Owen.

== Background and release ==
On February 13, 2009, "New Leaves" was posted on Owen's Myspace account. It was mentioned that Owen was in process of writing and demoing for their next album. On July 23, 2009, New Leaves was announced for release in two months' time. Alongside this, the album's artwork and track listing was posted online. On September 16, 2009, a music video was released for "Good Friends, Bad Habits". New Leaves was released on September 22, 2009, on Polyvinyl Records.

== Track listing ==
No.	Title	Length
1.	"New Leaves"	4:12
2.	"Good Friends, Bad Habits"	3:54
3.	"A Trenchant Critique"	2:48
4.	"Never Been Born"	4:43
5.	"Amnesia and Me"	3:41
6.	"Brown Hair in a Bird's Nest"	4:30
7.	"Too Scared to Move"	3:35
8.	"The Only Child of Aergia"	4:06
9.	"Ugly on the Inside"	2:56
10.	"Curtain Call"	4:13
Total length:		38:38
