= L'Ami du Peuple (album) =

L'ami du Peuple

Studio album by Owen
- Released: July 2, 2013
- Genre: Indie rock
- Length: 40:05
- Label: Polyvinyl Records
- Producer: Neil Strauch

Owen chronology
Ghost Town (2011)	L'ami du Peuple (2013)	Other People's Songs (2014)

Professional ratings
Aggregate scores
Source	Rating
Metacritic	(81/100)
Review scores
Source	Rating
Absolutepunk	(8/10)
Allmusic	4/5 stars
Consequence of Sound	(B)
Tiny Mix Tapes	3/5 marks
Ultimate-Guitar.com	(8/10)
Under the Radar	7/10 stars

L'ami du Peuple is the seventh album by Chicago musician Mike Kinsella under the moniker Owen. The record was released on July 2, 2013. It features ten tracks, recorded with collaboration from various musicians in the Chicago area indie hardcore scene. The introspective songs are written by Kinsella, and the instrumentation includes greater use of electronics and bowed strings than in his previous albums.

== Development ==
The title of the album was taken from the newspaper of the same name written during the French Revolution. The album was produced by Neil Strauch, and released through Polyvinyl Records.

== Track listing ==
No.	Title	Length
1.	"I Got High"	4:42
2.	"Blues to Black"	5:07
3.	"Love is Not Enough"	3:04
4.	"Coffin Companions"	5:11
5.	"The Burial"	4:00
6.	"Bad Blood"	3:47
7.	"Who Cares"	4:03
8.	"A Fever"	3:41
9.	"Where do I Begin?"	3:23
10.	"Vivid Dreams"	3:07
Total length:		40:05
