= Association football in America =

Association football in America could mean:

== United States ==
- Soccer in the United States
  - United States Soccer Federation
  - Major League Soccer

== The Americas ==
- Association football
  - CONCACAF (North America)
    - CONCACAF Gold Cup
    - CONCACAF Champions League
  - CONMEBOL (South America)
    - Copa América
    - Copa Libertadores
  - Soccer in Canada
    - Canadian Soccer Association
    - Canadian Soccer League

== See also ==
- Football in America (disambiguation)
- Sports in the United States
- Sport in South America
