= Atiba Jefferson =

American photographer and skateboarder (born 1976)

- Born: July 2, 1976 (age 50); Colorado Springs, Colorado, U.S.
- Occupations: Skateboarder, photographer
- Website: atibaphoto.com

Atiba Jefferson (born July 2, 1976) is an American photographer and skateboarder.

== Photography career ==
Jefferson has photographed skateboarding extensively for over 20 years, working for skate magazines such as Slap, Thrasher, Juxtapoz, Transworld, and many others. Jefferson is currently a staff photographer for Thrasher Magazine. In addition to skateboarding photography, Jefferson works as a commercial photographer shooting portraiture and lifestyle advertisements for clients such as the NBA, Nike, and many others. In addition to skateboarding photography, Jefferson has an interest in basketball and music photography. He is also part owner of the American Football House.

Jefferson was featured in the video games Tony Hawk's Pro Skater 4, Skate 2 and Skate 3.
