= American Football (EP) =

- 1998 release cover

EP by American Football
- Released: October 6, 1998
- Recorded: June 26–27, 1998
- Studios: Private, Urbana, Illinois, United States
- Genres: Indie rock, math rock, emo
- Length: 11:32
- Label: Polyvinyl

American Football chronology
American Football (1998)	American Football (1999)

Alternative cover

American Football is an EP and the debut release from American indie rock band American Football, released on October 6, 1998, by Polyvinyl Record Co.

== Reception ==
Editors at AllMusic gave the EP three out of five stars, with reviewer Blake Butler writing that "this three-song disc will leave you anxious to hear more".

== Track listing ==
1. "The One with the Tambourine" – 4:01
2. "Letters and Packages" – 3:21
3. "Five Silent Miles" – 4:10

== Personnel ==
American Football

- Mike Kinsella – guitar, vocals
- Steve Holmes – guitar
- Steve Lamos – drums

Additional personnel

- Brendan Gamble – engineering
- Gregg Bernstein – graphic design

== See also ==
- List of 1998 albums
