= American Football (2026 album) =

Fourth studio album by American Football

Studio album by American Football
- Released: May 1, 2026
- Studios: Panoramic House, Stinson Beach, California; Shirk, Chicago; Open House Contemporary, Chicago; Octopus Beak, Los Angeles
- Genres: Post-rock; emo
- Length: 49:43
- Label: Polyvinyl
- Producers: Sonny DiPerri; American Football

American Football chronology
| American Football (Live in Los Angeles) (2025) | American Football (2026) |

American Football studio chronology
| American Football (2019) | American Football (2026) |

Singles from American Football
- 1. "Bad Moons" Released: February 25, 2026; 2. "No Feeling" Released: April 8, 2026

Professional ratings
Aggregate scores
| Source | Rating |
|---|---|
| AnyDecentMusic? | 7.5/10 |
| Metacritic | 81/100 |
Review scores
| Source | Rating |
| AllMusic | 3/5 stars |
| DIY | 3.5/5 stars |
| Kerrang! | 4/5 |
| New Noise | 4/5 stars |
| Pitchfork | 8.0/10 |
| PopMatters | 8/10 |

American Football (also known as LP4) is the fourth studio album by American rock band American Football, released on May 1, 2026, via Polyvinyl Record Co. It is the band's first studio album in nearly seven years, after 2019's LP3.

The album features several guest vocalists including Brendan Yates of Turnstile, Caithlin de Marrais of Rainer Maria and Wisp.

== Background ==
Following a tour supporting LP3 in 2019, the band had planned to take a break by 2020; however, the COVID-19 pandemic had stretched their break indefinitely. By July 2021, drummer Steve Lamos quit the band due to personal reasons, and plans for writing material were remotely faltered, as Steve Holmes stated, "It was not easy to do on Zoom, and honestly, it wasn't clicking." In the meantime, Mike and Nate Kinsella were focusing on their side project, Lies, in which they partnered with producer/mixer Sonny DiPerri. Following Lamos' return to the band in 2023, the Kinsellas suggested they record LP4 with DiPerri in Stinson Beach, California.

A lengthy March 2026 profile with the band, published in GQ, revealed that Lamos left the band because he felt constantly belittled by Kinsella and was losing creative control over his own work. Lamos and Kinsella struggled with alcoholism; while Lamos was now 18 months sober, a dozen interviewees expressed concern over Kinsella's drinking habits, including his brother Tim Kinsella, who said: "Their relationship with drinking as a whole band absolutely fucking disgusts me. They think the world is a frat hazing."

The album also discusses Kinsella's infidelity and subsequent divorce.

== Musical content and composition ==
The band's label, Polyvinyl, described LP4 as "unflinchingly heavy", noting "suicide, shame, divorce, addiction, self-loathing and rebirth all surface, often within the same song". Holmes said, "If you read the lyrics on the page, they can seem grim, but there's hope in them."

Musically, the album has been described as post-rock and emo.

== Release ==
The album was first teased in early February, being officially confirmed that same month on February 18, 2026. The album's first single, "Bad Moons", was released on February 25, 2026. The second single, "No Feeling", dropped on April 8, 2026. The album was released on May 1, 2026.

== Track listing ==
All tracks are written by Steve Holmes, Steve Lamos, Mike Kinsella, and Nate Kinsella; "Blood on My Blood" written with Cory Bracken.

American Football track listing
| No. | Title | Length |
|---|---|---|
| 1. | "Man Overboard" | 5:38 |
| 2. | "No Feeling" (featuring Brendan Yates) | 4:48 |
| 3. | "Blood on My Blood" (featuring Caithlin De Marrais) | 5:01 |
| 4. | "Bad Moons" | 8:13 |
| 5. | "The One with the Piano" | 1:51 |
| 6. | "Patron Saint of Pale" | 5:13 |
| 7. | "Wake Her Up" (featuring Wisp) | 5:20 |
| 8. | "Desdemona" | 5:56 |
| 9. | "Lullabye" | 1:54 |
| 10. | "No Soul to Save" | 5:44 |
| Total length: | | 49:43 |

== Personnel ==
Credits adapted from Tidal, and the album's liner notes.

=== American Football ===
- Steve Holmes – guitar
- Steve Lamos – drums
- Mike Kinsella – vocals, guitar
- Nate Kinsella – bass

=== Additional performers ===
- Cory Bracken – vibraphone
- Mike Garzon – additional vocals on "Man Overboard" and "No Feeling"
- Brendan Yates – additional vocals on "No Feeling"
- Caithlin De Marrais – additional vocals on "Blood on My Blood"
- Ben Russell – violin on "Bad Moons"
- Lila Deckenbach – additional vocals on "Patron Saint of Pale"
- Stella Sen – additional vocals on "Patron Saint of Pale"
- Natalie R. Lu – additional vocals on "Wake Her Up"
- Gelsey Bell – additional vocals on "Desdemona"
- Choir on "No Soul to Save"
  - Ayobami Adebanjo
  - Chinwe Adebanjo
  - Yomi George

=== Production ===
- Sonny DiPerri – production, mixing
- American Football – production
- Nate Kinsella – engineering, additional production on "Bad Moons"
- Stephen Marcussen – mastering
- Steve Silverstein – additional vocal engineering on "Blood on My Blood"

=== Album art ===
- Chris Strong – photography
- Sonny DiPerri & Caroline Marchildon – additional photography
- Janelle Abad – art direction, additional photo coloring
- Bradley Pinkerton – artwork

== Charts ==
Chart performance for American Football
| Chart (2026) | Peak position |
|---|---|
| Scottish Albums (Official Charts) | 35 |
| UK Album Downloads (Official Charts) | 30 |
| UK Albums Sales (OCC) | 41 |
| UK Independent Albums (Official Charts) | 14 |
| UK Physical Albums (OCC) | 51 |
| US Top Album Sales (Billboard) | 23 |
| US Indie Store Album Sales (Billboard) | 5 |
