= American Football House =

House in Illinois, United States

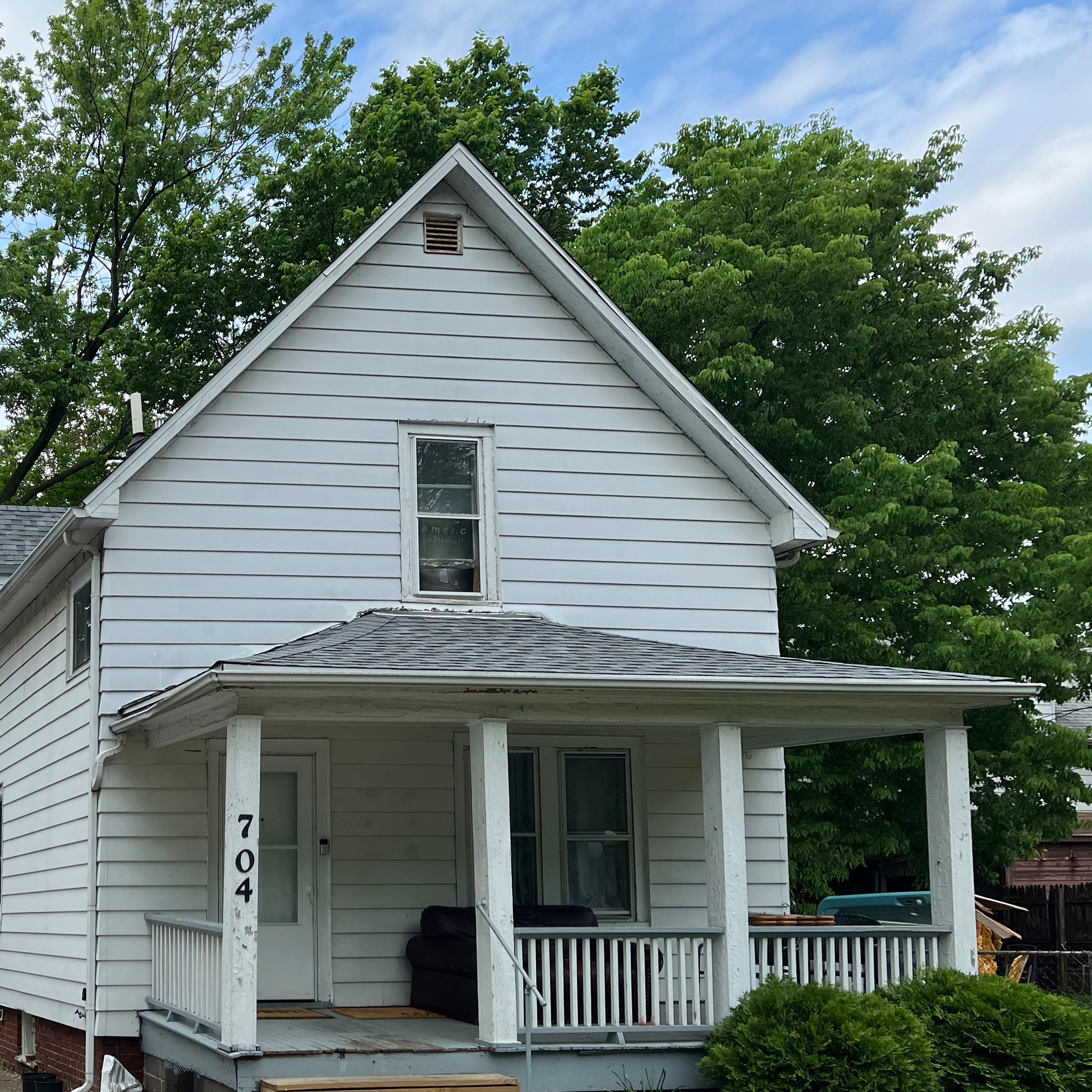
- Southwest view of the American Football House in 2023
- Interactive map of American Football House
- 40°06′35.9″N 88°12′59.6″W
- Type: House
- Location: 704 W. High St, Urbana, Illinois, United States

History
- Built: 1893; 133 years ago

Site notes
- Owner: American Football, Polyvinyl Records, Chris Strong, Atiba Jefferson, Open House Contemporary
- Website: americanfootball.house

The American Football House is a house in Urbana, Illinois, United States, known for its appearance on the cover of Midwest emo band American Football's 1999 debut album American Football. The house's interior was also featured on the cover of the band's 2016 second album, also titled American Football. The house has since become "one of music's biggest landmarks", attracting tourism, especially in the emo community.

== History ==
Built in 1893, the American Football House is located at 704 West High Street in Urbana, Illinois, near the campus of the University of Illinois Urbana-Champaign. One of the house's earliest residents was Charles M. Webber, who died while living there in 1931. Two of Webber's great-great-grandchildren, Adam and Michael Thies, worked at Polyvinyl Records, the Champaign-based record label behind American Football.

In 1980, the house was purchased by local real estate investor Fred Krauss, the father of musicians Alison Krauss and Viktor Krauss. It was passed on in the mid-1990s to Viktor, who owned the house until selling it in 2001.

By the 1990s, the house had become a popular venue for college parties and punk concerts. While a student at the university in the late 1990s, photographer and album cover artist Chris Strong lived in the basement with his girlfriend. No members of American Football ever lived in the house; however, as fellow students at the university, they were friends with Strong and frequently attended parties at the house. When American Football enlisted Strong to design cover artwork for their 1999 first album, Strong took "a couple thousand" photographs of the house. The photograph used for 1999's American Football album was a nighttime shot of the house's exterior, tilted upward at the second-floor window. When asked why the band chose this particular image, lead vocalist Mike Kinsella said, "we just liked the photo."

After American Football's 2000 breakup and 2014 reunion, Strong shot a 2014 music video inside the house for "Never Meant", the opening track on the band's 1999 album. An interior shot of the house's stairwell, also taken by Strong, was featured on the cover of the band's 2016 reunion album, also titled American Football. In 2020, amid the COVID-19 pandemic, American Football performed a virtual concert to over 10,000 viewers, set at a replica of the house built in Minecraft.

=== Ownership ===
In spring 2023, American Football announced on social media that they had purchased the house collectively with Polyvinyl Records, Chris Strong, photographer Atiba Jefferson, and the Chicago-based Open House Contemporary.

In a statement on the purchase, Polyvinyl wrote: "Besides being a literal home to its many tenants throughout the years, The American Football House has come to represent a nostalgic dream of possibility and the beauty of the beginning. We could not let that dream go." The house still had tenants at the time of the purchase, but Polyvinyl co-owner Matt Lunsford said there are plans for its future.

On August 26, 2024, the band listed the American Football House on Airbnb, offering rentals "for artists, creative retreats, events, and nightly stays".

== Architecture ==
The American Football House is a two-story house with white wood siding and a prominent window on the front-facing gable. Chris Strong described it as "not a terribly well-constructed house". Former resident Jessie Knoles recalled, "The hallway to the kitchen was so small and there was a door to a pantry in the tiny hallway so when the pantry was open, people from the living room couldn't make it to the kitchen."

== Legacy ==
As American Football accrued a cult following in the years after their 1999 breakup, the house became the main image that fans associated with the music. In a 2014 interview, Mike Kinsella argued that the main reason why the house has endured as a symbol is that "it's pretty much one of the only images affiliated with the band." The house's iconic status has been compared to the Andy Warhol banana print on the cover of The Velvet Underground & Nico.

In a 2016 article, Vice named the American Football House "one of music's biggest landmarks", describing it as one of the most famous tourist attractions in the emo community. As of 2023, the house is designated as a "place of worship" on Google Maps. Some fans have etched an "X" into the sidewalk to mark the exact location where Strong stood to take the iconic photograph from the 1999 album.

In 2024, the chiptune band Anamanaguchi moved into the house to write their album Anyway, which released in August 2025 on Polyvinyl Records and depicted the house on its cover.

== See also ==
- 100 Gecs tree
