= Owen (album) =

Studio album by Owen
- Released: September 18, 2001
- Genres: Folk-pop, indie rock, emo
- Length: 39:05
- Label: Polyvinyl Records

Owen chronology
Owen (2001)	No Good for No One Now (2002)

Professional ratings
Review scores
Source	Rating
AllMusic	4/5 stars
LAS Magazine	Favorable
Nude as the News	7.5/10
Pitchfork Media	7.2/10

Owen is the full-length debut album of American musician Mike Kinsella's solo project Owen. It was released on September 18, 2001.

== Reception ==
Nude as the News' A.K. Gold wrote that the album, "tends to be a bit homogenous throughout, probably a side effect of Kinsella undertaking every aspect of the record on his own. However, the pretty and simple down-tempo feel that spans throughout the record is comforting and thoughtful, like a meditation for the bedroom recording/listening set."

== Track listing ==
No.	Title	Length
1.	"That Which Wasn't Said"	2:11
2.	"Most Days And"	5:01
3.	"Most Nights"	2:14
4.	"Accidentally"	6:18
5.	"Declaration of Incompetence"	3:56
6.	"You Should Do It Now While It's on Your Mind"	4:13
7.	"Dead Men Don't Lie"	3:11
8.	"Places to Go"	4:45
9.	"Think About It"	7:16
Total length:		39:05

Japan Bonus Track
No.	Title	Length
10.	"Heads Will Ache"	6:53
Total length:		45:58
