= Other People's Songs (Owen album) =

Studio album by Owen
- Released: December 2, 2014
- Genre: Indie rock
- Length: 29:05
- Label: Polyvinyl Records
- Producer: Neil Strauch

Owen chronology
L'ami du Peuple (2013)	Other People's Songs (2014)	Owen/Into It. Over It. Split EP (2015)

Professional ratings
Aggregate scores
Source	Rating
Metacritic	(80/100)
Review scores
Source	Rating
Allmusic	4/5 stars
Consequence of Sound	(B)
Contactmusic.com	(3/5)
Paste	(8/10)
Popmatters	7/10 stars
The 405	(7.5/10)

Other People's Songs is the eighth studio album by Chicago musician Mike Kinsella under the moniker Owen. Announced on October 2, 2014, the album was released on December 2, 2014. It includes covers of songs from artists including Against Me!, Depeche Mode, The Promise Ring, Lungfish and more.

== Track listing ==
No.	Title	Original Artist	Length
1.	"Descender"	Lungfish	3:44
2.	"Girl in a Box"	Blake Babies	2:54
3.	"Some Kinda Angel"	Mojave 3	3:17
4.	"Forget Me"	The Promise Ring	3:54
5.	"Judas"	Depeche Mode	3:42
6.	"Just Like Them"	All	4:04
7.	"Borne on the FM Waves of the Heart"	Against Me!	4:06
8.	"Under the Blanket"	Smoking Popes	3:24
Total length:			29:05
