= American Football (1999 album) =

Debut studio album by American Football

Studio album by American Football
- Released: September 14, 1999
- Recorded: May 1999
- Studio: Private (Urbana, Illinois)
- Genres: Midwest emo; indie rock; math rock; post-rock
- Length: 40:52
- Label: Polyvinyl
- Producer: Brendan Gamble

American Football chronology
American Football (1998)	American Football (1999)	American Football (2016)

Alternative cover
- 25th anniversary edition cover

American Football, also known retrospectively as LP1, (Note: This article uses LP1 to refer to the album for consistency.) is the debut studio album by the American emo band American Football. It was released on September 14, 1999, on the record label Polyvinyl. At the time of recording, the group comprised Mike Kinsella on vocals and guitar, Steve Holmes on guitar, and Steve Lamos on drums, marking this as the band's only album to feature as a trio. LP1 was recorded in May 1999 at Private Studios in Urbana, Illinois, with production from Brendan Gamble.

Although LP1 received positive reviews from critics and performed well on US college radio stations, the band split up soon after its release because the band members no longer lived in the same city. Since then, the album has attained cult status and received further critical acclaim. It is now widely considered one of the most important emo records of all time. A deluxe edition was released by Polyvinyl in May 2014, shortly after American Football announced their reunion, the demand for which crashed the label's website and peaked at number 68 on the US Billboard 200. A month later, a music video was released for the song "Never Meant", directed by Chris Strong, who created the cover artwork for LP1.

== Background and recording ==
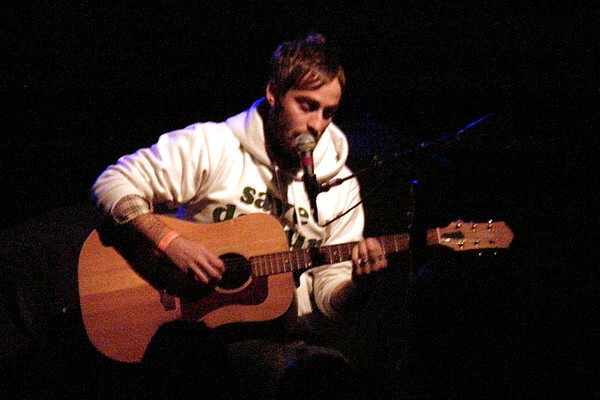
Bandleader Mike Kinsella in 2006: he previously was a member of Cap'n Jazz and Joan of Arc

Before playing for American Football, frontman Mike Kinsella previously played in Chicago-based bands Cap'n Jazz and Joan of Arc alongside his brother Tim, playing drums for both bands. In 1997, Kinsella started The One Up Downstairs, whose line-up consisted of Allen Johnson on bass, Steve Lamos on drums, David Johnson on guitar, and Kinsella himself on vocals. The One Up Downstairs recorded three songs planned for a 7-inch vinyl release by Polyvinyl. However, the band broke up before it was pressed, causing the record to be shelved. (Note: The vinyl was eventually released in 2006.) Shortly afterward, Lamos was jamming with Kinsella's college roommate Steve Holmes. Kinsella thought he "could add something", resulting in the trio forming American Football. The band's name comes from a poster that Lamos' girlfriend had spotted, stating "Come see American [f]ootball, the most overpaid athletes in the world."

The first time the group met it was considered to be casual, and the band's "[musical] ideas were noodly and meandering", according to Kinsella. The trio was based in Champaign, Illinois, while Kinsella was attending the University of Illinois. American Football was initially a side project, not intending to become a full-time commitment, as Holmes comments, due to the band "always half-assing things". The first song the group wrote together was the instrumental "Five Silent Miles". At the time they were listening to Steve Reich, attempting to work out the interplay between two guitars. The band released a 3-track self-titled EP in October 1998, which included "Five Silent Miles".

LP1 was made "literally in the last four days" before two out of the three members of the band had to move back home from college, according to Kinsella. The album was recorded in May 1999 at Private Studios in Urbana, Illinois. On the technical side, the album was recorded to ADAT tapes and mixed on a TASCAM digital tape deck. That mix was bounced to a DAT tape master, from which subsequent reissues have been struck. The LP was produced by Brendan Gamble; he previously produced the band's self-titled EP. According to Lamos, the song titles were made up a couple of hours "before we finished the artwork." Prior to creating the song titles, songs were referred vaguely as "the B song or the C-sharp song." Kinsella had a journal that he used lyrics from, though they were written "from years before that, so it was just like, 'Yeah, that'll work.'" After writing the lyrics and melodies, Kinsella would "just screech...them out." While practicing the material, they did not have a PA system and thus Holmes and Lamos did not know the lyrics until the group did live performances. According to Kinsella, the songs' melancholic lyrics were due to influences from outside of emo and post-hardcore, which included such bands as the Cure, Red House Painters, and The Sundays.

== Composition and music ==
Musically, LP1 is described as an emo, indie rock, math rock, and post-rock album with elements of jazz. Loudwire said the album's tracks were "meticulously crafted to balance dream-like jazz influence with progressive rock sensibilities." Kinsella used American Football in an attempt to revive the more rock-oriented sound of Joan of Arc's earlier material. Holmes and Kinsella were into punk and hardcore music, while Lamos was into jazz.

The band concentrated on interaction between the two guitars, basing their timing on musical cues. Ian Cohen of Pitchfork expressed his interpretation of the album as a "rebuke of the Midwestern scene that had been shaped by the incalculable long-tail influence of Mike Kinsella’s previous one-album supernova Cap’n Jazz, rerouting emo’s bloodline from hardcore toward minimalist jazz and meditative math-rock."

Each song is in a different tuning. Not all of the material was in a finished state by the time the band went to record; they agreed to simply "finish [writing] these songs in the studio and put out the record." As all but two of the songs lack bass guitar, group decided to thicken the sound by doubling and tripling the guitar tracks. Kinsella commented on what became American Football's signature guitar tone: "Now you can buy a shimmer pedal to recreate what we did, but we did it manually and I think it was just dumb luck. By doing it the stupid way, it became our own thing." In addition to their usual instruments, each member provided further instrumentation: Holmes played the Wurlitzer while Lamos played trumpet and bass, and Kinsella played bass. The album was mastered by Jonathan Pines at Private Studios in July 1999.

== Release ==
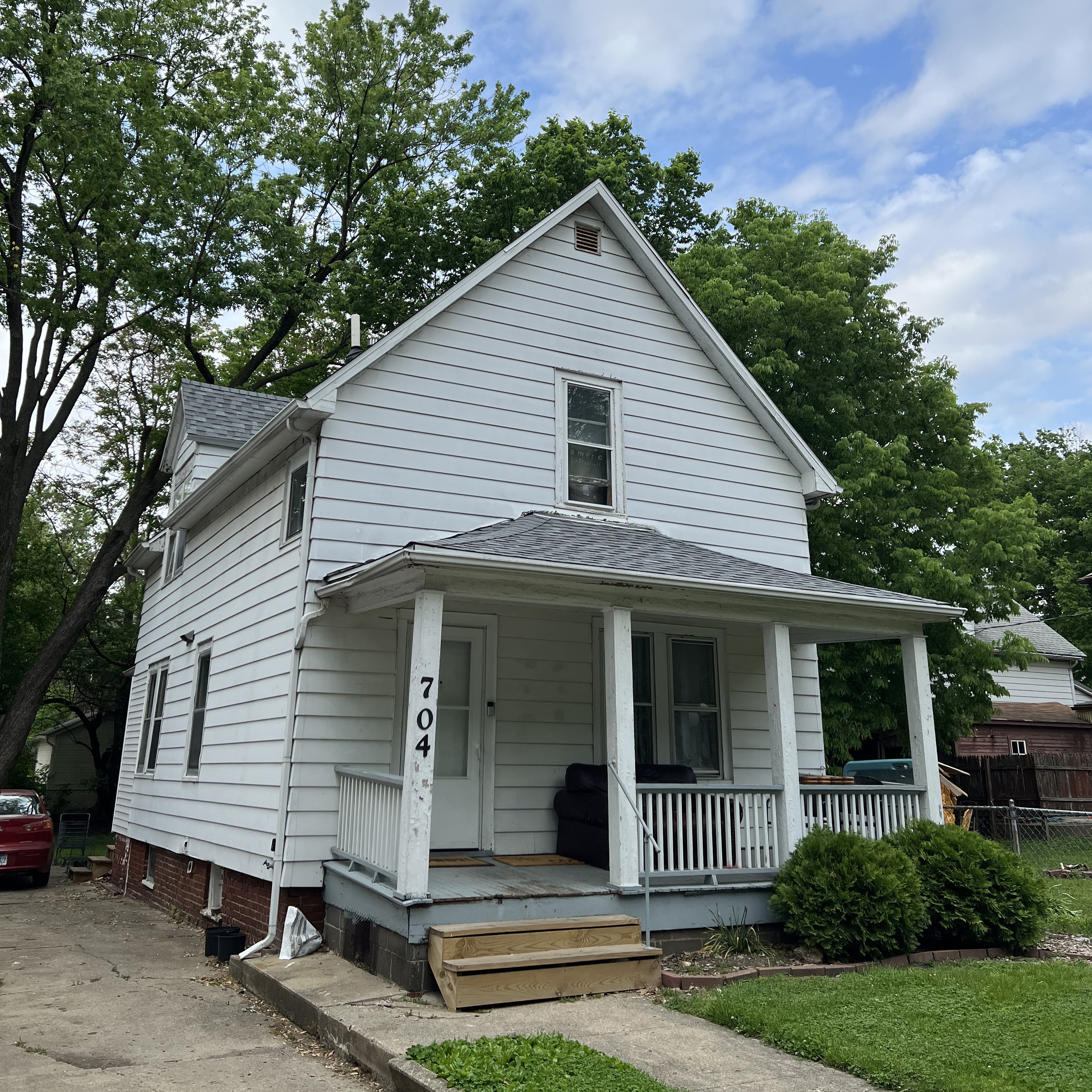
The American Football House pictured in 2023: contrary to the name, none of the band members lived in it, according to an interview with the Line of Best Fit.

LP1 was released on September 14, 1999, through Polyvinyl Record Co. The band broke up due to the members no longer living in the same city and their college courses coming to an end. Kinsella has since stated the band knew when they were recording the album that they were going to break up. Kinsella also said that they "never had any ambitious goals. [W]e weren't kids who wanted to...tour all summer." Ian Cohen of Pitchfork assessed, "the album turned out to be a farewell from a band that had scarcely introduced itself."

Kinsella and Holmes both moved to Chicago and remained in contact at first. Meanwhile, Lamos moved to Colorado, later becoming a professor. Kinsella wanted to form a new group where he had full creative control, and formed the Owen project, while Holmes and Lamos later played together with The Geese. In 2004 Kinsella recorded an acoustic version of "Never Meant" for a split release between Owen and Rutabega. Also that year, the LP1 album was pressed on vinyl for the first time and released on Polyvinyl.

The album's cover features a top of a house, with the upstairs light lit. The house, located on 704 W. High St in Urbana, Illinois, is within walking distance of the University of Illinois. Photography was done by Chris Strong and was designed by Strong and Suraiya Nathani. None of the band members lived in the house; according to Kinsella, "it was friends of friends" who lived in the house when they went to college. Joe Goggins, writing for the Line of Best Fit, wrote that "Like all the best cover shots," the photo symbolizes "the music it prefaces in such an intangible, elusive way," also noting the album "sounds like it could only have been made in small-town America," and that the cover art "looks as if it could only really have been taken in similar surroundings."

=== Initial reception ===
Professional ratings
Pre-reissue and initial reviews
Review scores
Source	Rating
LAS Magazine	9/10
Pitchfork	7.5/10 (1999)
Punknews.org	(2004)
Spin	7/10

Initial reviews for LP1 were positive, but the album was considered only a minor success. According to a contemporary in the CMJ New Music Report, the album performed well at college radio stations, which was attributed to Kinsella's musical past. Despite the critical praise from college radio, the album's promotion was hindered due to the band's breakup. In a review for Spin, Andrew Beaujon gave the album a 7 out of 10, likening its composition to the output of jangle pop band Felt and contrasting it against the work of other bands in the emo genre, like Jets to Brazil. However, he unfavorably described Kinsella as a "torpid vocalist" whose voice he believed made him sound like an older person.

Pitchfork's Taylor M. Clark gave the album a 7.5 out of 10; he praised the drumming and vocals, but criticized the frequent use of the trumpet and the album's lyricism. A contemporary review by Kent McClard of heartattaCk said that the album was "polished and gentle" and that the album was not for everyone, but the band "[does] it very well". Writing for the website Nude as the News, Mark Donohue said: "Unfailingly pretty, well-played, and tangibly vulnerable in a way ironically few 'emo' bands ever leave themselves, American Football is an impressive debut album. It could use a few scene breaks to jar the listener out of the endless guitar lull, but taken track-by-track, it's a fine collection of songs." In the 2004 digital edition, Jordan Rogowski of Punknews.org gave the album four and a half stars out of five; he praised its lyricism, describing it as "thoughtfully and intelligently constructed." He believed the lack of Kinsella's vocals "works in its favor", allowing the listener to experience the full instrumentation.

== Legacy ==
Professional ratings
Reissue reviews
Review scores
Source	Rating
AllMusic	4.5/5 stars
The A.V. Club	A−
Consequence of Sound	A
Filter	83%
The Line of Best Fit	9/10
Paste	9.0/10
Pitchfork	8.6/10 (2014)
Punknews.org	(2014)

Despite its initial minor success, LP1, with the help of word of mouth, gained cult status since its release; as a result, it was frequently bootlegged, and became a major topic of discussion on Internet forums. The album is considered an important work of the emo genre that set up the foundations for later bands in the 2000s; following the decline of the genre, a new wave of artists aimed to reproduce its early sound, with American Football being an influence. Polyvinyl co-founder Matt Lundford described the album's subsequent sales figures and influence in the years following its release in a 2019 interview with Noisey as "a constant climb upwards." Lunford recalled LP1 "just kept organically being discovered by people, and then inspiring people and inspiring bands, and then being rediscovered."

AllMusic reviewer Fred Thomas gave the album four and a half stars and described it as "an anomalistic emo-jazz hybrid"; he noted the record's laid-back production compared to emo's more aggressive tone and hardcore origins. Joe Goggins of The Line of Best Fit gave the album a 9 out of 10, labeling the record as a "perfectly-pitched, emo mood piece"; he noted the typical themes of emo, citing anger, regret, disappointment and frustration. Goggins interprets the calm yet sad tone of LP1 as Kinsella experiencing these emotions but having to move on as a significant amount of time has passed since then. Philip Cosores of Paste gave the record a 9.0 out of 10, describing it as an "album that ultimately defies genre classification"; he states it "serves as what indie rock should be about, synthesizing the musical world around us, not dividing and separating."

The American Football House became a landmark for emo music fans, who often visit the house to take photos. Music journalist Sean Neumann, who documented the history of the house for Vice, noted that fans have carved markings into the sidewalk in front of the home where Strong took the original photograph. The house would later take a leading position in the band's reunion, and the interior of the house later used for the cover of their eponymous second album. Kinsella revealed that the repeated references to the house was due to the fact it was one of the few images related to the band. (Note: Other images include three promotional pictures of the band, all dating from 1999.) American Football revealed they, Polyvinyl, Chris Strong, Atiba Jefferson and Open House Contemporary had collectively purchased the house on May 5, 2023, "in an effort to preserve its place and legacy within the community that built it."

Stereogum listed "Never Meant" as one of "30 Essential Songs from the Golden Era of Emo" and "The Summer Ends" as one of "30 Essential Post-Rock Songs". NME listed the album as one of "20 Emo Albums That Have Resolutely Stood the Test of Time". Rolling Stone ranked the album at number 6 on their list of the "40 Greatest Emo Albums of All Time"; it was ranked number 5 in a similar list by Kerrang!. "Never Meant" was named the greatest emo song of all time by Vulture.

Em Casalena of American Songwriter wrote, "American Football is one of the most heartwrenching breakup albums ever written and produced… and not only in the Midwest emo genre."

Ellise Shafer of Variety conferred the title of the "ultimate Midwest emo anthem" on the album's opening track, "Never Meant". In congruence, Kerrang! called the track "one of the defining songs of the genre," and stated that the album as a whole is the one that "everyone seems to have agreed is the pinnacle of emo, despite the fact that you’d probably have to be in the band to name more than four songs from it."

=== Reissues and touring ===
In April 2014, American Football announced they were reuniting for live performances. Holmes said the group realised that "the time was ripe for three middle aged dudes to play some old songs about teenage feelings, and stand around tuning guitars for a long time." Polyvinyl released a deluxe edition of two discs containing various demos and live tracks with expanded packaging on May 20. (Note: U.S. Polyvinyl PRC 276CD) Demand for the re-release had crashed Polyvinyl's website. The reissue came about when Holmes found cassette tapes of demos and showed them to Polyvinyl. Polyvinyl, who first teased a possible release back in 2012, asked if the band wanted to do anything with the tapes. The group were initially unaware of the album's anniversary. One of the live recordings was "The 7's"; it was one of the first songs the band ever wrote and was used to close their live performances. The song was "one of the more interesting things" the band ever wrote, according to Holmes and showcases the band's interest in different time signatures.

On June 5, 2014, a music video was released for "Never Meant". Directed by Chris Strong, the video was filmed inside and around the house that features on the album cover artwork. The video was set in Urbana, Illinois, around 1999. Strong revealed that the storyline was "about a brief relationship occurring between two characters at the end of their college experience". Strong had other people portray the band. American Football, with the addition of Kinsella's cousin Nate playing bass, played a surprise show in August in Chicago. They then followed this up with playing a festival in September and three nights at New York's Webster Hall. Further dates running into December were also played. In December, a live video was released for "Never Meant", filmed in October at New York's Webster Hall. The band played their first ever UK shows in May 2015. The reissue charted at number 68 on the Billboard 200 chart, number 5 on the Catalog Albums chart and number 22 on the Tastemaker Albums chart; it was ranked at number 1 on Paste's "Five Recent Reissues Worth Owning" list in 2014.

A 25th anniversary edition reissue and covers album was released on October 18, 2024, including a separate music cover album. The cover album included bands and solo artists with singles covered by Iron & Wine, Manchester Orchestra, Blondshell, Novo Amor, Lowswimmer, Girl Ultra, John McEntire, M.A.G.S, Yvette Young and Ethel Cain.

== Track listing ==
All songs written and composed by American Football.

LP1 track listing
No.	Title	Length
1.	"Never Meant"	4:28
2.	"The Summer Ends"	4:46
3.	"Honestly?"	6:10
4.	"For Sure"	3:16
5.	"You Know I Should Be Leaving Soon"	3:43
6.	"But the Regrets Are Killing Me"	3:54
7.	"I'll See You When We're Both Not So Emotional"	3:42
8.	"Stay Home"	8:10
9.	"The One with the Wurlitzer"	2:43
Total length:		40:52

Deluxe edition bonus tracks
No.	Title	Length
1.	"Intro" (live at the Blind Pig, Champaign, IL, 1997)	0:28
2.	"Five Silent Miles" (live at the Blind Pig, Champaign, IL, 1997)	3:39
3.	"Untitled #1 (The One with the Trumpet)" (boombox practice session, 1998)	3:43
4.	"Untitled #2" (boombox practice session, 1998)	2:13
5.	"Stay Home" (boombox practice session, 1998)	5:58
6.	"Untitled #3" (boombox practice session, 1999)	7:09
7.	"Never Meant" (4-track album prep, 1999)	3:38
8.	"But the Regrets Are Killing Me" (4-track album prep, 1999)	3:46
9.	"I'll See You When We're Both Not So Emotional" (4-track album prep, 1999)	3:52
10.	"The 7's" (live at the Blind Pig, Champaign, IL, 1997)	7:26
Total length:		41:52

== Personnel ==
Adapted from the liner notes.

American Football

- Steve Holmes – guitars, Wurlitzer
- Steve Lamos – drums, percussion, trumpet
- Mike Kinsella – vocals, guitars, bass guitar

Technical personnel

- Brendan Gamble – recording and production
- Chris Strong – photography
- Chris Strong, Suraiya Nathani – design

== Charts ==
Chart performance for American Football
Chart (2014)	Peak position
U.S. Billboard 200	68
U.S. Billboard Catalog Albums	5
U.S. Billboard Tastemaker Albums	22
U.S. Billboard Vinyl Albums	3
