= I Do Perceive =

I Do Perceive.

Studio album by Owen
- Released: November 9, 2004
- Recorded: Chicago, USA
- Genre: Indie rock
- Length: 45:18
- Label: Polyvinyl

Owen chronology
(the ep) (2004)	I Do Perceive. (2004)	At Home with Owen (2006)

Professional ratings
Review scores
Source	Rating
AbsolutePunk	(8.5/10)
AllMusic	4.5/5 stars
LAS Magazine	9/10
PopMatters	3/10 stars
Punknews.org	4.5/5 stars
Sputnikmusic	4.5/5 stars

I Do Perceive is the third album by the Chicago artist Mike Kinsella under the name Owen. It was released on November 9, 2004, on Polyvinyl Records.

== Track listing ==
No.	Title	Length
1.	"Who Found Who's Hair in Who's Bed?"	4:39
2.	"Note to Self:"	6:15
3.	"Playing Possum for a Peek"	5:35
4.	"That Tattoo Isn't Funny Anymore"	6:30
5.	"Put Your Hands on Me, My Love"	5:35
6.	"She's a Thief"	3:55
7.	"Bed Abuse"	7:30
8.	"Lights Out"	5:15
Total length:		45:18

Japan Bonus Track
No.	Title	Length
9.	"I Woke Up Today"	2:25
10.	"In the morning, Before Work (Live)"	3:34
11.	"More Than Words (Extreme cover)"	3:24
Total length:		54:41
