= American Football (band) =

American Midwest emo band

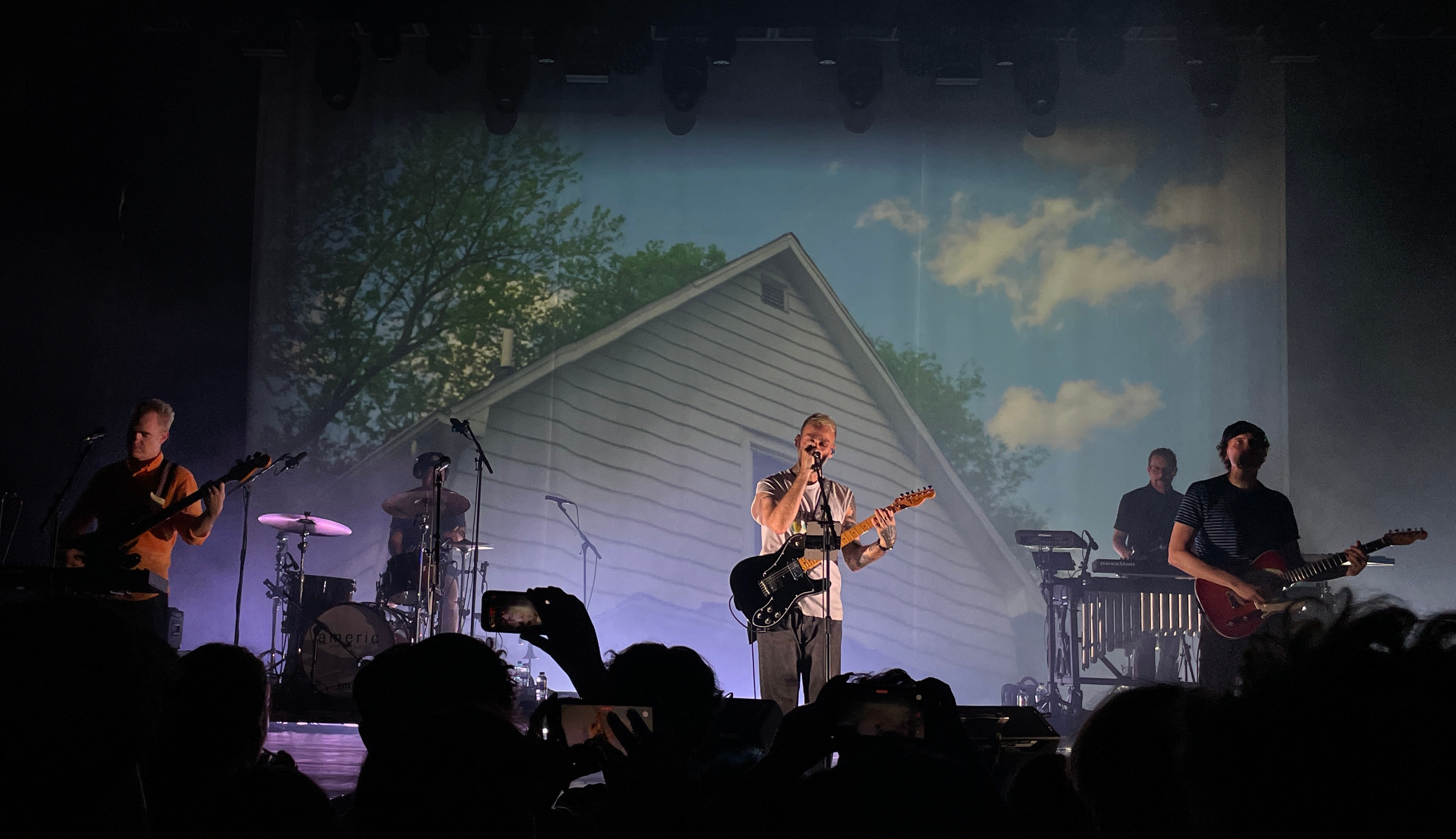
- American Football performing in 2026

Background information
- Origin: Urbana, Illinois, U.S.
- Genres: Midwest emo; math rock; post-rock
- Works: American Football discography
- Years active: 1997–2000; 2014–present
- Labels: Polyvinyl; Wichita; Big Scary Monsters
- Spinoffs: Owen
- Spinoff of: Cap'n Jazz
- Members: Mike Kinsella; Steve Holmes; Nate Kinsella; Steve Lamos
- Website: americanfootballmusic.com

American Football is an American midwest emo band from Urbana, Illinois, originally active from 1997 to 2000. They reformed in 2014.

The band was formed by guitarist, bassist and singer Mike Kinsella (formerly of Cap'n Jazz and Joan of Arc; currently of Owen), guitarist Steve Holmes and drummer and trumpet player Steve Lamos (formerly of the One Up Downstairs). Lamos announced his departure from the band in 2021 but rejoined in 2023.

Despite the group's short initial lifespan, their self-titled debut album became one of the most acclaimed emo and math rock records of its era. After reuniting in 2014, with Kinsella's cousin Nate Kinsella joining the band, American Football has released three more albums, all bearing the same name as their debut: American Football (2016), American Football (2019), and American Football (2026). Each album is also referred to numerically as LP1, LP2, LP3, and LP4.

== History ==
=== Formation ===
Mike Kinsella and Steve Holmes met at an early age. Both were students at Wheeling High School in Wheeling, Illinois, where Kinsella played drums for Cap'n Jazz; Holmes played guitar in a variety of bands and was later roommates with Kinsella at the University of Illinois Urbana-Champaign. Kinsella and Lamos began playing together with David Johnson and Allen Johnson in 1997 under the name "The One Up Downstairs", in which Kinsella was exclusively a vocalist. Three songs were recorded under this name, with the intention of releasing them as a 7" record on Polyvinyl Records. However, the band splintered before the record could be pressed, and the songs were shelved. The three tracks recorded by The One Up Downstairs would finally be released in 2006 as a digital download EP and in 2009 as a 7" record through Polyvinyl. Kinsella claims the group "broke up with their fists".

David Johnson and Allen Johnson went on to form the band Very Secretary (and later Favorite Saints), while Kinsella and Lamos began working with Steve Holmes. According to Holmes, the genesis of the band's sound came about as he and Kinsella were moving away from the post-hardcore they had grown up listening to and toward other influences: "We loved Yank Crime, the last Drive Like Jehu record. We were like, 'Oh, they've mastered this sound. No band could do this loud, screamy math-rock better than them, so let's do the opposite.’ Let's try to do slow, quiet, pretty songs that are more influenced by Red House Painters and Nick Drake."

American Football released its self-titled debut EP in 1998 and its self-titled debut album in 1999, both through Polyvinyl Records.

Though the band did not record bass on the EP, Kinsella played bass guitar on some songs for the LP, with Lamos adding a second bass track to one song.

Within a year of the release of its full-length, American Football became a studio project. Soon after, the band mutually agreed to stop recording together as each member began focusing on their personal lives. Despite the band's breakup, the album received critical acclaim and gained a cult fanbase. Mike Kinsella's solo project Owen borrows some of the sonic characteristics of American Football, and he would later re-record "Never Meant" as Owen in 2004.

=== Reformation ===
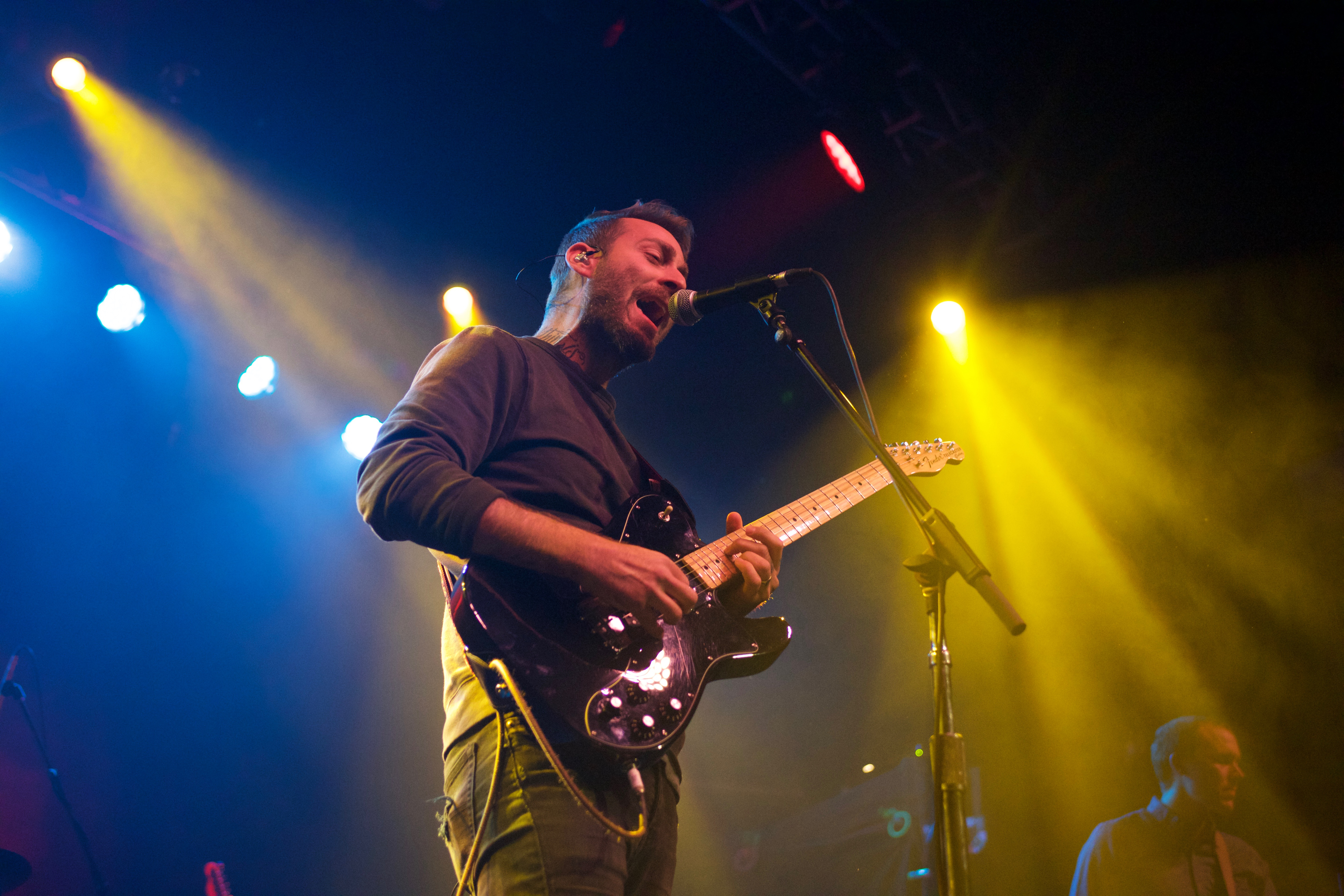
Mike Kinsella performing with American Football in 2017

In March 2014, Polyvinyl Records announced a deluxe reissue of the band's eponymous debut album, including 10 additional unheard demos and live recordings. Live dates, in Champaign and New York, were announced the following month, all of which sold out. For these dates, Mike's cousin Nate Kinsella joined the band on bass – becoming a permanent fixture of the band thereafter. Further tour dates followed in the US, Canada, Spain, the UK, Japan, and Australia.

Two years after reforming, the band released their second album. Again eponymous, and again on Polyvinyl, the album was released in October 2016, preceded by the single "I've Been So Lost for So Long", which was made available for streaming through SoundCloud. The album's cover featured the same house photographed on the band's first full-length album, although this time they shot the inside of the house. The American Football House had become a landmark for emo music fans around the world since the first album's release, who would travel to Urbana, Illinois, to take photos outside of the home.

American Football's third album, once again eponymous, was released in March 2019, with the single "Silhouettes" made available upon announcement the preceding December. A second single, "Uncomfortably Numb", followed in January 2019. It featured vocals from Paramore's Hayley Williams, marking the first time the band had implemented a featured artist on a song.

Steve Lamos announced his departure from the band in July 2021, citing a change of situation in his life. Lamos revealed five years later that he left because he felt constantly belittled by Kinsella and was losing creative control over his own work. A single with the tracks "Rare Symmetry" and "Fade Into You", a Mazzy Star cover, was released in December 2021.

On February 13, 2023, the band were announced as the opener for The 1975's outdoor show at Finsbury Park in London on July 2. Later that day, Lamos confirmed his return to the band via Instagram. In May 2023, the band announced that they had purchased the American Football House to save it from likely demolition by developers. The following month, the band played their first public show since December 2019 at Beat Kitchen in Chicago.

On February 18, 2026, the band announced their fourth eponymous album, which was released on May 1—again via Polyvinyl. They will tour from May through September of 2026 with support from Mei Semones, Marconi Union, Ian Sweet, Afternoon Bike Ride, and Bleachers.

== Musical style and influences ==
American Football is usually classified as an emo band. The band's musical style has been also categorized as math rock and post-rock due to the band's use of uncommon time signatures and guitar tunings in their songs, which is a staple of both genres. The band's music has also been variously labeled as indie rock, dream pop and slowcore.

Describing the group's sound, Tim Sendra of AllMusic wrote, "The trio spent almost a year coming up with a clean, melodic approach that blended the intimacy of emo with the empty space of jazz, while adding pop hooks and jangling guitar interplay to the mix." In their article about the history of math rock, specialized online magazine Fecking Bahamas described American Football as "a second-wave emo band rooted in unconventional melodic song structures as well as containing elements of math rock and slowcore." John Hill of Loudwire said: "[Mike Kinsella's] twinkling, technical guitar work [...] forms the foundation for the group, [along with] his chemistry with guitarist Steve Holmes, and the ways they weave in and out of each other on [tracks such as] 'Never Meant' and 'I'll See You When We’re Both Not So Emotional.'"

Steve Holmes has commented on the band's sound, their influences, and relationship with emo, saying: "With this band, we really did make a conscious shift away from the post-hardcore, emo, whatever sound and scene that we had come out of. Freshman year, I was turned on to a lot of the bands that would influence our sound: Nick Drake, Red House Painters, Elliott Smith, Codeine, the Sea and Cake, The Smiths/Morrissey, Slowdive, My Bloody Valentine, Can, Steve Reich, etc. Mike always liked the slow, sad, dreamy, pretty stuff and I picked that up from him. Tortoise and post-rock bands like Slint were an influence. Lamos brought in his love of 70s jazz fusion via Weather Report and Miles Davis. I was also big into The Beatles and The Beach Boys and lesser known 60s bands and 90s bands that aped that sound."

== Impact ==
American Football is considered one of the most important bands of the late 1990s Midwest emo scene and subgenre. Numerous bands and artists have attempted to emulate the sound of the band's debut album since its release. Ian Cohen of Pitchfork wrote, "After the bursting of the Myspace bubble, hundreds of bands took Kinsella's elliptical expressions of hope and heartbreak as unfinished business, rebuilding the genre on a foundation of open-tuned Telecasters, capos, and red and black flannels. Yet, while the sound of American Football is remarkably easy to replicate, its spirit of wistful carpe diem remains forever elusive."

According to Loudwire, many people incorrectly assume American Football were pioneers of the Midwest emo style: "While American Football's influence on Midwest emo is undeniable, there were several other acts that helped shape the genre's sound in its early days."

== Members ==
Current members

- Mike Kinsella – lead vocals, guitar (1997–2000, 2014–present), bass guitar (1997–2000)
- Steve Holmes – guitar (1997–2000, 2014–present), keyboards (1997–2000)
- Nate Kinsella – bass guitar, backing vocals, vibraphone (2014–present)
- Steve Lamos – drums, percussion, trumpet (1997–2000, 2014–2021, 2023–present)

Current touring musicians

- Mike Garzon – percussion, keyboards, melodica, backing vocals, guitar (2014–present)
- Cory Bracken – vibraphone, percussion (2016–present)

Former touring musicians

- Sarah Versprille – backing vocals (2019)
- Damien Verrett – guitar (2019)

== Discography ==
- American Football (1999)
- American Football (2016)
- American Football (2019)
- American Football (2026)
