= Mike Kinsella =

American musician (born 1977)

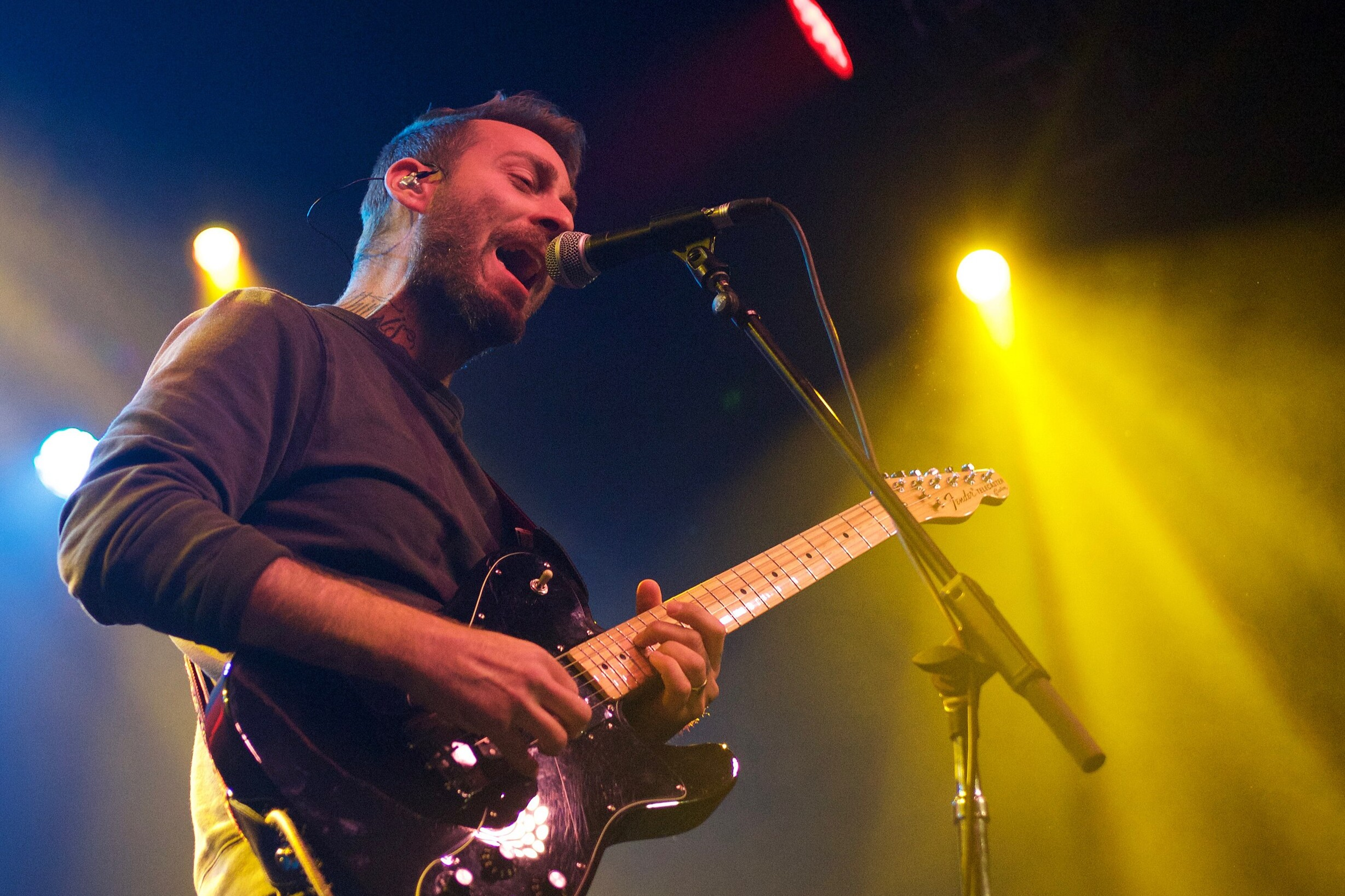
- Kinsella performing in 2017

Background information
- Born: March 4, 1977 (age 49)
- Origin: Chicago, Illinois
- Genres: Emo; indie rock; punk rock; Midwest emo; post-rock
- Occupations: Musician; singer-songwriter
- Instruments: Vocals; guitar; keyboards; bass guitar; drums
- Years active: 1989–present
- Labels: Polyvinyl; Jade Tree; Green Linnet; Perishable; Man With Gun
- Member of: The One Up Downstairs; Owls; Joan of Arc; Owen; Cap'n Jazz; American Football; Their / They're / There; Lies
- Website: owenmusic.com

Mike Kinsella (born March 4, 1977) is an American musician and singer-songwriter. He has been involved in many Illinois-based bands and is best known as the lead vocalist and guitarist of the emo band American Football.

== Career ==
Kinsella's first musical project was serving as drummer for the band Cap'n Jazz, which he co-founded with his brother Tim. Cap'n Jazz originally featured their local high school star running back on drums. When he quit to focus on football, a 12-year-old Mike Kinsella learned how to play a 16-piece drum set.

With either Tim and/or cousin Nate Kinsella, he has also participated in the projects Owls and Joan of Arc.

In 1997, Kinsella, along with Steve Lamos and Steve Holmes, formed the band American Football, which would go on to release an EP in 1998 and a full-length album in 1999, before disbanding. After a 15-year hiatus, the band returned in 2014. They issued a second album in 2016, a third in 2019, and a fourth one in 2026.

In 2001, Kinsella began his current solo project, Owen, in which he performs vocals, guitar, bass, drums, keyboards, loops, etc. Kinsella was also in a band called The Shirts and Skins, with his wife. In 2013, he released two EPs with Their / They're / There, a project featuring Evan Weiss of Into It. Over It. and Matthew Frank of Loose Lips Sink Ships. He has also been part of the band The One Up Downstairs, alongside American Football drummer Steve Lamos.

Many of his albums, including Owen and No Good for No One Now, were recorded at his mother's home.

== Influences and legacy ==
Kinsella has cited numerous bands as influences, including the Cure, Depeche Mode, Dinosaur Jr., the Sundays, the Smiths, and My Bloody Valentine.

John Hill of Loudwire wrote, "It's not often a guitarist is credited for being the progenitor of an entire style of music; however, you'd be hard-pressed not to give Mike Kinsella his dues for what he's given to the worlds of mid-west emo and math rock", adding that "emotion bleeds into every note he plays".

== Personal life ==
Kinsella married his wife Ryan in 2006; they have two children together. In 2019, Ryan discovered that Kinsella had been in a two-year relationship with another woman, leading to their divorce.

== Discography ==
Year	Title	Band	Label	Format	Additional information
1995	Burritos...(AKA: Shmap'n Shmazz)	Cap'n Jazz	Man With Gun Records	LP/CD	Drums/vocals
1997	A Portable Model Of...	Joan of Arc	Jade Tree Records	LP/CD	Drums
1998	Analphabetapolothology	Cap'n Jazz	Jade Tree Records	2×CD	Drums/vocals
1998	American Football	American Football	Polyvinyl Records	EP/CD	Guitar/vocals
1999	American Football	American Football	Polyvinyl Records	LP/CD	Guitar/bass/vocals
1999	Live in Chicago, 1999	Joan of Arc	Jade Tree Records	LP/CD	Drums
2000	The Gap	Joan of Arc	Jade Tree Records	LP/CD	Drums
2001	Owls	Owls	Jade Tree Records	LP/CD	Drums
2001	Owen	Owen	Polyvinyl Records	CD	Guitar/vocals/drums/bass
2002	No Good for No One Now	Owen	Polyvinyl Records	CD	Guitar/vocals/drums/bass
2002	Open Ground	Kyle Fischer	Polyvinyl Records	CD	Drums
2003	Best of Altan	The Songs Altan	Green Linnet Records	CD	Harmonica
2003	In Rape Fantasy and Terror Sex We Trust	Joan of Arc	Perishable Records	CD	Bass/drums/percussion
2003	So Much Staying Alive and Lovelessness	Joan of Arc	Jade Tree Records	CD	Bass/drums
2004	Anyone in Love With You (Already Knows)	Rainer Maria	Polyvinyl Records	CD	Tambourine
2004	The Rutabega/Owen Split EP	Owen	Polyvinyl Records	CD	Guitar/vocals/drums/bass
2004	Total Eclipse of the Heart	The Love of Everything	Record Label Records	CD	Drums
2004	(The EP)	Owen	Polyvinyl Records	CD	Guitar/vocals/drums/bass
2004	Joan of Arc, Dick Cheney, Mark Twain	Joan of Arc	Polyvinyl Records	CD	Drums
2005	I Do Perceive	Owen	Polyvinyl Records	CD	Guitar/vocals/drums/bass/programming
2005	Association of Utopian Hologram Swallowers	Owen	Polyvinyl Records	CD	Guitar/vocals
2005	Presents Guitar Duets	Joan of Arc	Record Label Records	CD	Guitar
2006	At Home with Owen	Owen	Polyvinyl Records	CD	Guitar/piano/vocals
2007	Many Times I've Mistaken	Joan of Arc	Polyvinyl Records	EP/CD	Guitar
2007	Owen/The City on Film	Owen	Red Cars Go Faster	7-inch vinyl	Guitar/piano/organ/vocals
2008	Boo! Human	Joan of Arc	Polyvinyl Records	LP/CD	Drums
2009	The Seaside EP	Owen	Polyvinyl Records	CD	Guitar/vocals
2009	New Leaves	Owen	Polyvinyl Records	CD	Guitar/vocals
2010	Abandoned Bridges	Owen	Polyvinyl Records	7-inch EP	Guitar/vocals
2010	Darling, Darling	Crissi Cochrane	Independent	CD	Drums/guitar
2011	Oh, Evelyn	Owen	Polyvinyl Records	7-inch EP	Guitar/vocals/drums/bass
2011	Ghost Town	Owen	Polyvinyl Records	CD, vinyl	Guitar/vocals
2013	Their / They're / There	Their / They're / There	Polyvinyl Records	CD, vinyl	Drums
2013	L'Ami du Peuple	Owen	Polyvinyl Records	CD, vinyl, cassette	Guitar/vocals/drums/piano/bass
2013	Analog Weekend	Their / They're / There	Polyvinyl Records	CD, vinyl	Drums
2014	TWO	Owls	Polyvinyl Records	CD, vinyl, cassette	Drums
2014	American Football (Deluxe Edition)	American Football	Polyvinyl Records	CD, vinyl, cassette	Guitar/bass/vocals Deluxe edition of first LP
2014	Other People's Songs	Owen	Polyvinyl Records	CD, vinyl, cassette	Guitar/vocals/drums/piano/bass
2015	Owen/Into It. Over It. Split EP	Owen	Polyvinyl Records	Vinyl	Guitar/vocals/drums/piano/bass
2016	The Sleep Whose Dreams Are Life	Aleph Eris	HOMHOMHOM Records of the Eternal Now	Vinyl	Drums
2016	The King of Whys	Owen	Polyvinyl Records	CD, vinyl, cassette	Guitar/vocals/drums/piano/bass
2016	American Football	American Football	Polyvinyl Records	CD, vinyl, cassette	Guitar/vocals
2019	American Football	American Football	Polyvinyl Records	CD, vinyl, cassette	Guitar/vocals
2020	The Avalanche	Owen	Polyvinyl Records	CD, vinyl, cassette	Guitar/vocals
2023	Lies	Lies	Polyvinyl Records	Vinyl	Guitar/vocals
2024	The Falls of Sioux	Owen	Polyvinyl Records	CD, vinyl	Guitar/vocals
2026	American Football	American Football	Polyvinyl Records	CD, vinyl, cassette	Guitar/vocals
