= Owen (musician) =

Solo project of Mike Kinsella

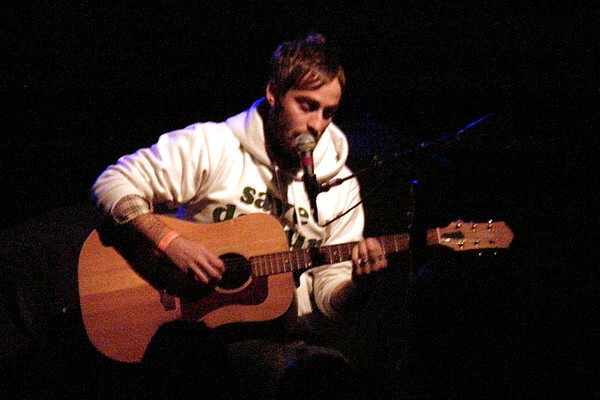

Background information
- Origin: Chicago, Illinois, United States
- Genres: Indie rock; emo; math rock; singer-songwriter; acoustic rock
- Years active: 2001–present
- Labels: Polyvinyl Records; Hobbledehoy Record Co.; Wichita Records; Big Scary Monsters
- Members: Mike Kinsella
- Website: owenmusic.com

Owen is the primary solo project of American musician Mike Kinsella. The project features soft melodies and complex acoustics, combining acoustic guitar with keyboard, other guitars, vocals, and drums.

== Career ==
Owen's debut album, Owen, marked a departure from Mike Kinsella's previous projects. For the second album, No Good For No One Now, Kinsella opted to purchase recording equipment instead of studio time. In 2004, Kinsella collaborated with Cale Parks (of Aloha), Bob Hoffnar, Jen Tabor, and Paul Koob, to record (the ep). Despite rumors of a live band tour, Kinsella rejoined Joan of Arc and toured with Maritime and Aloha. (the ep) was written as a companion piece to a planned full-length album. Later in 2004, Kinsella recorded I Do Perceive, Owen's third album, with assistance from his cousin Nate Kinsella.

At Home With Owen featured a different approach to recording, incorporating sessions at Semaphore Studios and Engine Studios with producers Nate Kinsella and Brian Deck. In July 2009, Polyvinyl Records released The Seaside EP, a collection of songs previously available only as Japanese bonus tracks and a track from the Association of Utopian Hologram Swallowers.

Kinsella's personal life changes, including becoming a husband and father, influenced the writing process for Owen's fifth album, New Leaves. Produced by Brian Deck, Graeme Gibson, Tim Iseler, and Nate Kinsella, New Leaves features ten tracks reflecting personal growth and complexity.

In 2010, Owen released the single "Abandoned Bridges" and an EP titled O, Evelyn in April 2011. The album Ghost Town followed on November 8, 2011. L'Ami du Peuple, was released on July 2, 2013.

On October 2, 2014, it was announced that Owen would release a covers album titled Other People's Songs, which was released on December 2, 2014, through Polyvinyl Records. This album includes covers of songs by artists such as Against Me!, Depeche Mode, The Promise Ring, and Lungfish.

In July 2016, Owen released the album The King of Whys through Polyvinyl in the United States and Wichita Recordings in the United Kingdom. In June 2020, the album The Avalanche was released through Polyvinyl Records.

On February 8, 2024, Kinsella announced an album titled The Falls of Sioux, which was released on April 26, 2024, through Polyvinyl Records. The single "Beaucoup" was released in advance.

== Discography ==
- Owen (2001)
- No Good for No One Now (2002)
- I Do Perceive (2004)
- At Home with Owen (2006)
- New Leaves (2009)
- Ghost Town (2011)
- L'Ami du Peuple (2013)
- Other People's Songs (2014)
- The King of Whys (2016)
- The Avalanche (2020)
- The Falls of Sioux (2024)
