= Candy Claws =

American dream pop band

- Origin: Fort Collins, Colorado, U.S.
- Genres: Dream pop; noise pop; shoegaze
- Years active: 2007–2015, 2023–present
- Labels: Twosyllable; Indiecater
- Spinoffs: Sound of Ceres
- Members: Ryan Hover; Karen Hover; Hank Bertholf
- Website: candyclaws.com

Candy Claws is an American dream pop group formed in Fort Collins, Colorado in 2007. It consists of founding members Ryan Hover, Karen Hover and Hank Bertholf. They disbanded in 2015, soon after the release of Ceres & Calypso in the Deep Time, which over time has proved to be their most popular and lasting work. They reunited in 2023 and released their first new music in a decade called "Distortion Spear". Although released as part of the 10-year anniversary of Ceres & Calypso in the Deep Time, it is a new recording by the band.

== History ==
The band was formed in 2007 by Ryan Hover, Karen Hover (née McCormick) and Hank Bertholf. The members shared interests in "electronics, droning shoegaze rock, and classic psychedelic pop", as well as lyrics informed by their love of natural history.

In 2009, the band released their debut album, In the Dream of the Sea Life, which was inspired by Rachel Carson's book The Sea Around Us. Originally released by Wave Magic label, it was re-released by Irish independent label Indiecater Records and earned enthusiastic reviews from the international music press. In 2010, the Twosyllable Records released the band's follow-up album, Hidden Lands, which was inspired by Richard M. Ketchum's The Secret Life of the Forest. During this time, Candy Claws also assembled an expanded eight-piece touring band for live performances. The band's third album, Ceres & Calypso in the Deep Time, was released in 2013.

In 2014, Ryan and Karen formed a new band, Sound of Ceres, featuring the members of The Apples in Stereo and The Drums. The band released their debut album, Nostalgia for Infinity in 2016.

In 2023, the band announced a 10th anniversary reissue of Ceres & Calypso in the Deep Time, which included "Distortion Spear", their first single in 12 years.

== Band members ==
- Ryan Hover — synthesizer, vocals
- Hank Bertholf — guitar, vocals
- Karen Hover (McCormick) — vocals, percussion, keyboard

== Discography ==
Studio albums

- In the Dream of the Sea Life (2009)
- Hidden Lands (2010)
- Ceres & Calypso in the Deep Time (2013)

EPs and singles

- Daytrotter Session (2010)
- Verana Summers (2011)
- "Distortion Spear" (2023)

Compilation albums

- Glacier Prey (2009)
- Warm Forever (2010)

Other releases

- Two Airships / Exploder Falls (2008) (an alternate soundtrack to Werner Herzog's film The White Diamond)
- Dreamland Soundtrack - Season 1 (2011)
- Do You Ever Feel That Way (2012) (a Starflyer 59 cover, with Mike Adams At His Honest Weight)
