= Bell Ord Forrest =

Studio album by I Love You (Yah Tibyah La Blu)
- Released: October 27, 2009
- Label: Joyful Noise

I Love You (Yah Tibyah La Blu) chronology
Drone, Drugs and Harmony (2008)	Bell Ord Forrest (2009)	Feeling Bad To Feel Better (2011)

Bell Ord Forrest is I Love You (Yah Tibyah La Blu)'s first full-length studio album released on October 27, 2009 on Joyful Noise Recordings.

== Track listing ==
1. "The Colloquialism Is Simply "Gas"" – 4:20
2. "This Is the Best Birthday Ever" – 3:24
3. "Freelance Pedestrian" – 1:51
4. "Cliff Drive Nights" – 3:36
5. "Making Snow Angels in Angel Dust" – 8:01
6. "Graceland is Better Without Elvis" – 1:05
7. "Pillow Talk" – 4:43
8. "Sorry I Drank Your Soda" – 4:34

== In The Media ==
- Joyful Noise releases Bell Ord Forrest by new signing I Love You TODAY! (Movement News Blog)
- "Bell Ord Forrest" (Babysue)
- "Bell Ord Forrest Review" (Indie Surfer Blog)
- "I Love You: Bell Ord Forrest" (Fensepost)
- "A Band From a City That Doesn't Care" (Flagpole Magazine)
- "It’s like Talking Heads or B52 being converted into this millenniums Now People." (Ptolemaic Terrascope)
- "Song of the Day - The Colloquialism Is Simply Gas by I Love You" (Present Magazine)
