= Davy Crockett (disambiguation) =

Davy Crockett was a celebrated 19th-century American folk hero, frontiersman, soldier and politician.

Davy or Davey Crockett may also refer to:

== People ==
- Davy Crockett (outlaw) (c. 1853–1876), descendant of the frontiersman Davy Crockett
- Davey Crockett (baseball) (1875–1961), American baseball player and manager
- Davey Crockett, nickname of Davey MacManus of the Welsh band The Crocketts

== Arts and entertainment ==
- Davy Crockett (play), a popular 1872 play
- Davy Crockett (1910 film), a 1910 American silent film
- Davy Crockett (1916 film), a 1916 American silent film
- Davy Crockett (miniseries), a 1954 five-part TV serial on Disneyland
  - Davy Crockett: King of the Wild Frontier, a 1955 film using footage from the Disneyland serial starring Fess Parker
  - Davy Crockett and the River Pirates, a 1956 theatrical film made from the two final episodes of the Disneyland serial
- "Davey Crockett", a track from the 2010 album Fang Island by indie rock band Fang Island
- "Davey Crockett", song by Thee Headcoats, from The Kids Are All Square - This Is Hip!

== Other uses ==
- Davy Crockett (nuclear device), a tactical nuclear recoilless gun
- Davy Crockett (book), a 1934 biography of the American folk hero written for children by Constance Rourke
- David Crockett, a ship mentioned in the song "The Leaving of Liverpool"

== See also ==
- David Crockett (wrestling) (born 1946), pro wrestling announcer
- "The Ballad of Davy Crockett", a 1955 song with music by George Bruns and lyrics by Thomas W. Blackburn
- Crockett (disambiguation)
