= Death Rider =

Death Rider, Deathriders, may refer to:

== Pro-wrestling ==
- Death Riders, a multi-promotion pro-wrestling group formerly called the Blackpool Combat Club
- Death Rider, a Brazilian wrestler featured in the Brazilian Wrestling Federation
- The Death Rider, an American pro-wrestler; see List of former Extreme Championship Wrestling personnel
- Death rider, a pro-wrestling move, a version of the DDT (professional wrestling)

== Music ==
- DeathRiders, a U.S. heavy metal band formed by Neil Turbin in 2001
- The Death Riders, a band formed by Rob Nicholson (Blasko) in 2005
- Death's Rider, a 2022 album by Hellbutcher; see Martin Axenrot

=== Songs ===
- "Death Rider", a 1983 song by Overkill off the record Power in Black
- "Deathrider", a 1984 song by Anthrax off the album Fistful of Metal
- "Death Rider", a 1984 song by Omen off the record Battle Cry
- "Death Rider", a 2009 song from the Serbian film Technotise: Edit & I
- "Death Rider / Third War", a 2017 song by Sanctuary off the album Inception

== Other uses ==
- Death Riders, an outlaw motorcycle club that was patched over the Hells Angels through Normand Hamel and became a support club;, which participated in the Quebec Biker War
- Delta Company (nicknamed "Death Riders"), 11th Armored Cavalry Regiment, U.S. Army
- Death Riders, a 1994 film; see List of biker films
- Deathriders, a 2003 novel by Alan Gibbons
- Death Riders, a 2011 novel by Justin Richards, part of the Doctor Who franchise novels New Series Adventures
- Death Rider, an alias for the Marvel Comics character Ghost Rider (Danny Ketch)

== See also ==
- Four Horsemen of the Apocalypse in popular culture
- Dead Riders, a 1953 book by Elliott O'Donnell
- Dead Rider, U.S. rock band
- Rider (disambiguation)
- Death (disambiguation)
