= The Twin (album) =

Studio album by Sound of Ceres
- Released: October 6, 2017
- Genre: Dream pop Shoegaze pop Alternative rock
- Length: 36:28
- Label: Joyful Noise Recordings
- Producer: Alex Somers

Sound of Ceres chronology
Nostalgia for Infinity (2016)	The Twin (2017)

Professional ratings
Review scores
Source	Rating
AllMusic	3.5/5 stars

The Twin is the second studio album by Sound of Ceres, released on October 6, 2017.

== Track listing ==
No.	Title	Length
1.	"Gemini Scenic"	04:04
2.	"Humaniora"	03:25
3.	"Outer Century"	04:38
4.	"The Trance"	02:45
5.	"Rhatikon Chain"	01:32
6.	"Io Scenic A/B"	04:12
7.	"The Twin"	04:13
8.	"Mercury's Moods"	03:05
9.	"Solar Mirror 9"	03:33
10.	"Eden V"	05:01
Total length:		36:28

== Personnel ==
=== Sound of Ceres ===
- Derrick Bozich - Guitar synthesizer
- Jacob Graham - Synthesizer
- Karen Hover - Vocals
- Ryan Hover - Composer, programming, vocals
- Ben Phelan - Synthesizer

=== Production ===
- Alastair Reynolds - Story
- Justin Shturtz - Mastering
- Alex Somers - Instrumentation, mixing, producer
