= What's Missing (band) =

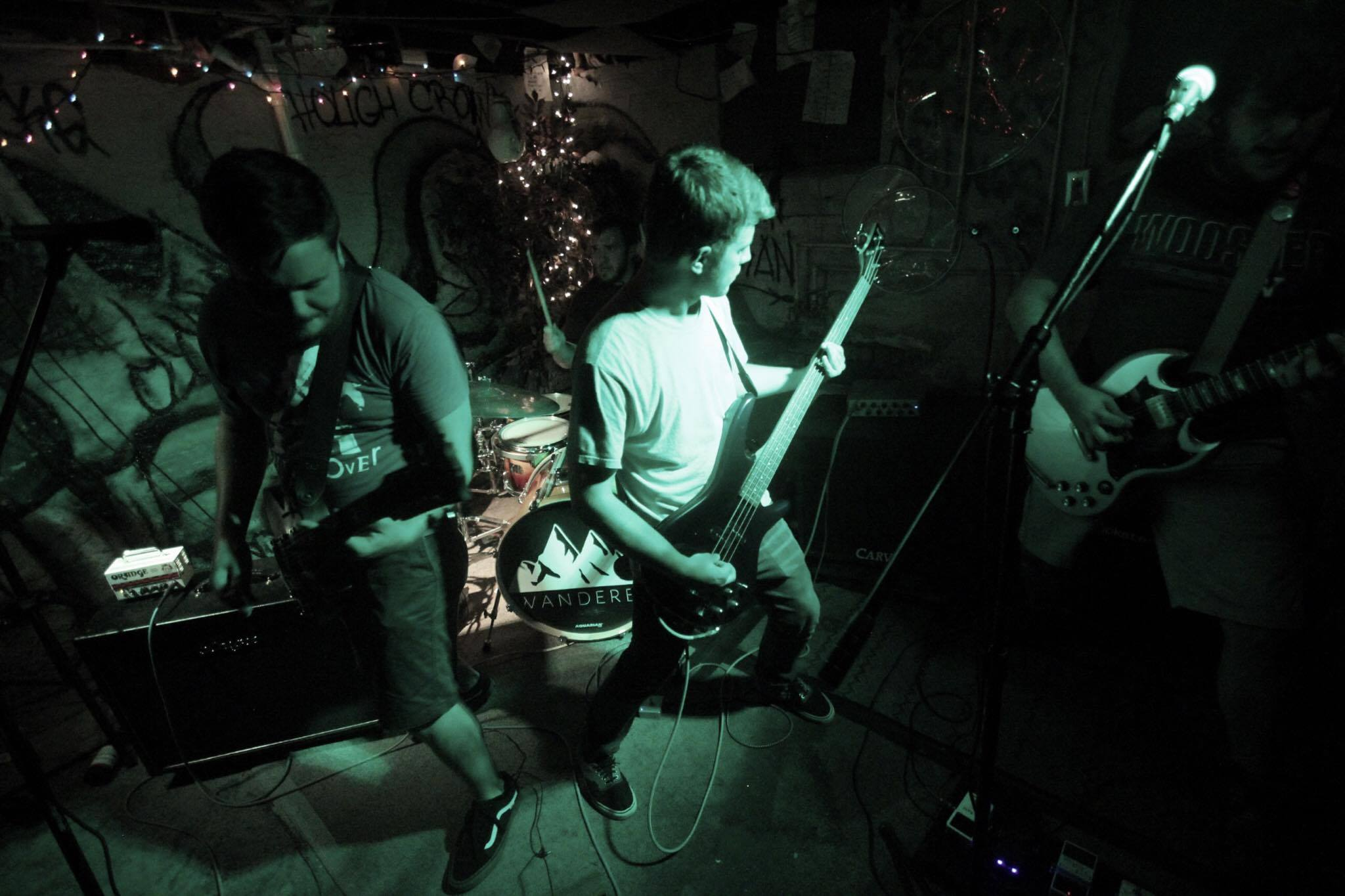
- What's Missing performing live in Cleveland, Ohio, on July 15, 2017.

Background information
- Origin: Morgantown, West Virginia
- Genres: Alternative rock; Indie rock; Power pop
- Years active: 2013 - 2023
- Spinoffs: Great Comet
- Past members: Zane Miller; Matt Herrald; Geoff Minnear; Brian Spragg; Aaron New
- Website: facebook.com/whatsmissingwv

What's Missing were a rock band from Morgantown, West Virginia, formed in 2013. To date they have released two EPs: Under (2015), and Shortly Thereafter (2017), along with a variety of singles. They have been described as "grungy, raspy pop-punk.” The band draws influence from artists like Green Day, Balance And Composure, and Rozwell Kid.

The band was formed by singer/guitarist Zane Miller, guitarist Aaron New, and drummer Matt Herrald after Miller and New began attending school together at West Virginia University in the fall of 2013. New departed from the band in late 2018, later starting a new project, Great Comet, and What's Missing underwent changes before settling on their final line-up featuring bassist Brian Spragg and guitarist Geoff Minnear.

In the fall of 2015, the band released their first EP, Under, with help from producer Eric Kirkland. In the summer of 2016, they released a single, "Threadbare," with proceeds at the time going to victims of the Pulse night club shooting in Orlando. In February 2017, the band released their EP Shortly Thereafter with help from Spragg (who previously produced for Rozwell Kid). It was mixed by Mat Kerekes of Citizen.

The band dissolved in late 2023, after nearly a decade of activity.

== Discography ==
EPs

- Under (2015)
- Shortly Thereafter (2017)

Singles

- "Threadbare" (2016)
- "Unfun - The Swelter Song" (2018)
- "Root" (2019)
- “Some Truth” (2019)
- “Bottle & Burst/Waste Me” (2020)
- “Cholula Oblongata” (2022)
- "Lion v. Tuna/Well" (2022)
