= Vervaet =

Vervaet is a surname. Notable people with the surname include:

- Arthur Vervaet (1913–1999), American politician;
- Bram Vervaet, member of the band Eerie Wanda;
- Frederik Vervaet, Belgian classical philologist;
- Imke Vervaet (born 1993), Belgian sprinter.
