= Sleeping bag (disambiguation) =

A sleeping bag is a padded or insulated bag for a person to sleep in.

Sleeping bag may also refer to:

- Sleeping bag (infant), a bag-like garment for infants
- "Sleeping Bag" (song), a 1985 song by ZZ Top
- Sleeping Bag Records, an American record label
- Sleeping Bag (band), an alternative/indie rock band based out of Bloomington, Indiana
