= Sunshine (Talk Normal album) =

Studio album by Talk Normal
- Released: October 23, 2012
- Genre: Rock
- Length: 43:02
- Label: Joyful Noise

Talk Normal chronology
Sugarland (2009)	Sunshine (2012)

Professional ratings
Aggregate scores
Source	Rating
Metacritic	73/100
Review scores
Source	Rating
AllMusic	4/5 stars
Consequence of Sound	C+
Pitchfork	7.7/10
Tiny Mix Tapes	3.5/5 stars

Sunshine is the second studio album by American rock duo Talk Normal. It was released in October 2012 under Joyful Noise Recordings.

== Track listing ==
No.	Title	Length
1.	"Lone General"	5:04
2.	"XO"	3:21
3.	"Bad Date"	4:29
4.	"Sunshine"	5:09
5.	"Hot Water Burns"	4:28
6.	"Shot This Time"	4:45
7.	"Cover"	4:30
8.	"Baby, Your Heart's Too Big"	5:42
9.	"Hurricane"	5:34
