= Crocus (The Ophelias album) =

Studio album by the Ophelias
- Released: September 24, 2021
- Genres: Indie rock, indie folk
- Length: 37:17
- Label: Joyful Noise Recordings

The Ophelias chronology
Almost (2018)	Crocus (2021)	Spring Grove (2025)

Professional ratings
Review scores
Source	Rating
Flood Magazine	8/10
The Line of Best Fit	6.0/10
Pitchfork	7/10
Spectrum Culture	73/100
Sputnikmusic	3.5/5 stars

Crocus is the third full-length album from American indie rock band the Ophelias. The album was released on September 24, 2021, via Joyful Noise Recordings.

== Track listing ==
All tracks are written by The Ophelias.

Crocus track listing
No.	Title	Length
1.	"Crocus"	3:21
2.	"Sacrificial Lamb"	2:03
3.	"Neil Young on High (featuring Julien Baker)"	3:07
4.	"Vapor"	2:57
5.	"Spirit Spent"	3:43
6.	"Biblical Names"	2:49
7.	"Mastermind"	1:29
8.	"Becoming a Nun"	2:40
9.	"Spitting Image"	3:04
10.	"Under Again"	2:38
11.	"The Twilight Zone"	4:36
12.	"Vices"	4:30
Total length:		37:17

== Personnel ==
The Ophelias

- Spencer Peppet — guitars, lead vocals, piano, synthesizer, banjo; bass on "Crocus"
- Andrea Gutmann Fuentes — violin, backing vocals, melodica, Midi boys choir; harmony vocals on "Spirit Sent" and "Mastermind"
- Jo Shaffer — bass on all tracks except "Crocus"
- Mic Adams — drums, backing vocals, percussion

Additional personnel

- Andrew Boylan — additional guitar on "Sacrificial Lamb", backing vocals on "Spitting Image"
- Julien Baker — vocals on "Neil Young on High"
- Jake Kolesar — piano on "Vapor", melodica on "Mastermind", backing vocals on "Spitting Image"
- Kate Wakefield — cello on "Spirit Sent", "Biblical Names", "Becoming a Nun", "Spitting Image", "The Twilight Zone"
- Nina Paiyatis — second violin on "Becoming a Nun" and "The Twilight Zone"
- Ben Sloan — additional percussion on "The Twilight Zone" and "Vices"
- Peter Boylan — horns on "The Twilight Zone"
- Anissa Pulcheon — viola on "The Twilight Zone"
