= The Chronicles of Marnia =

Studio album by Marnie Stern
- Released: March 19, 2013
- Studio: Rare Book Room, Brooklyn, New York
- Genre: Experimental rock, indie rock
- Length: 32:46
- Label: Kill Rock Stars
- Producer: Nicolas Vernhes

Marnie Stern chronology
Marnie Stern (2010)	The Chronicles of Marnia (2013)	The Comeback Kid (2023)

Singles from The Chronicles of Marnia
- 1. "Year of the Glad" Released: December 11, 2012; 2. "Nothing Is Easy" Released: February 14, 2013

Professional ratings
Review scores
Source	Rating
AllMusic	4.5/5 stars
The A.V. Club	C+
Consequence of Sound	4.5/5 stars
Pitchfork	8.0/10

The Chronicles of Marnia is the fourth album by Marnie Stern, released on March 19, 2013, on Kill Rock Stars.

== Track listing ==
1. "Year of the Glad" – 3:39
2. "You Don't Turn Down" – 3:11
3. "Noonan" – 3:09
4. "Nothing Is Easy" – 3:48
5. "Immortals" – 2:54
6. "The Chronicles of Marnia" – 3:10
7. "Still Moving" – 3:06
8. "East Side Glory" – 2:55
9. "Proof of Life" – 3:42
10. "Hell Yes" – 3:17

== Personnel ==
- Marnie Stern – vocals, guitar, keyboards
- Evan Jewett – guitar, keyboards, vocals
- Nithin Kalvakota – bass guitar, guitar
- Kid Millions – drums
- Nicolas Vernhes – engineer, producer
