= Sleep Party People =

Danish musician

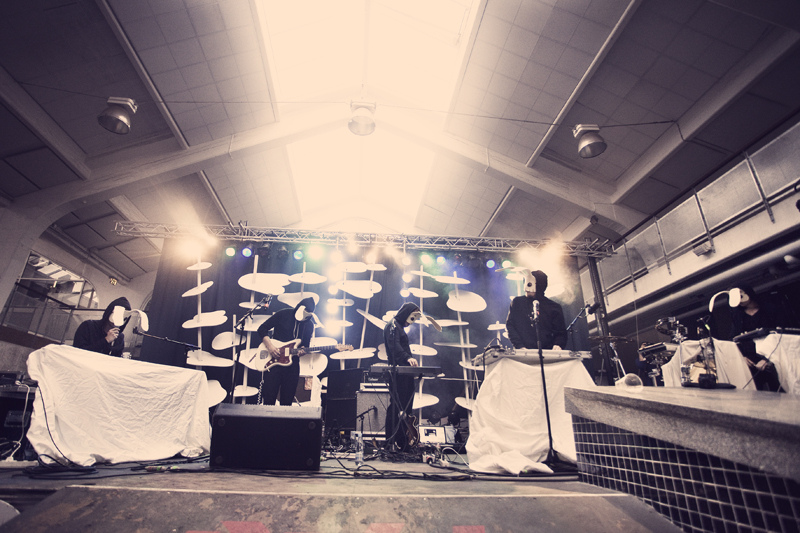
- Sleep Party People in 2010

Background information
- Origin: Denmark
- Genres: Dream pop, slowcore, shoegaze, post-rock, ambient
- Years active: 2008–present
- Labels: Joyful Noise Recordings
- Members: Brian Batz
- Website: www.brianbatz.com

Sleep Party People is the alias of musician Brian Batz, hailing from Denmark.

== History ==
Sleep Party People was formed in 2008 as a project of Brian Batz, influenced by artists like Boards of Canada, David Lynch and Erik Satie, starting a unique proposal of the Danish music scene. Since its beginning, the one-man project has been characterized by wearing rabbit masks in his photoshoots and live performances.

Contrary to the misconception that Sleep Party People is a band, Brian Batz is the sole member of Sleep Party People. Kaspar Kaae, Jacob Høegh, Brajs Bertram, Casper Hegstrup, Anders Stig Møller, Hans Hvidberg, Per Lyhne, Rasmus Lindahl, Line Felding, and Frederik Thybo have all performed with Batz in live shows. Batz explains in an interview with Motion Pikczer, "It's a bunch of good friends that's playing with me. So, it's not a band, it's just me and my bunnies, in a way."

Quickly gaining acceptance, Sleep Party People was featured in Soundvenue, a magazine covering the Danish music scene. After this, the record label Neh-Owh Records chose two of his songs to be featured in a compilation EP. In the end of 2009, Batz signed with the label A:larm Music. In 2010, he released his self-titled debut album with 10 songs.

With this success, Batz was featured in Dutch and British magazines.

In April 2012, Sleep Party People released a new album titled We Were Drifting on a Sad Song. In 2013, they toured the United Kingdom.

In 2013, Batz traveled to San Francisco to start to craft the third album in the company of producers Jeff Saltzman and Mikael Johnston. Batz recorded and wrote everything there and returned to Denmark with a nearly finished album. The album, Floating, was released in Scandinavia and Asia on May 30, 2014, and worldwide on June 2, 2014.

Sleep Party People was signed by Joyful Noise Recordings in February 2017.

In 2022, SPP released their sixth LP: Heap of Ashes.

== Discography ==
=== Studio albums ===
==== Sleep Party People (2010) ====
No.	Title	Length
1.	"In the Morning Sun We Stand"	1:41
2.	"Our Falling Snow"	3:22
3.	"10 Feet Up"	4:02
4.	"Notes to You"	3:11
5.	"An Iris Pseudocorus"	3:49
6.	"The Dwarf and the Horse"	3:11
7.	"A Sweet Song About Love"	2:52
8.	"Third Drawer Down"	4:11
9.	"I'm Not Human at All"	6:29
10.	"Everything Has an End"	9:18
Total length:		42:05

==== We Were Drifting on a Sad Song (2012) ====
No.	Title	Length
1.	"A Dark God Heart"	4:34
2.	"Chin"	4:32
3.	"We Were Drifting on a Sad Song"	4:57
4.	"Melancholic Fog"	3:22
5.	"Heavy Burden"	4:48
6.	"Gazing at the Moon"	4:35
7.	"Heaven Is Above Us"	3:54
8.	"Things Will Disappear Like Tears in the Rain"	6:00
9.	"The City Light Died"	6:36
Total length:		43:18

==== Floating (2014) ====
No.	Title	Length
1.	"Change In Time"	3:51
2.	"Floating Blood of Mine"	4:30
3.	"A Stranger Among Us"	4:20
4.	"In Another World"	4:07
5.	"Death is the Future"	3:08
6.	"I See the Sun, Harold"	4:05
7.	"I See the Moon" (feat. Lisa Light)	7:50
8.	"Only a Shadow"	4:31
9.	"Scattered Glass"	4:28
Total length:		40:47

==== Lingering (2017) ====
No.	Title	Length
1.	"Figures"	4:14
2.	"The Missing Steps"	3:55
3.	"Fainting Spell"	3:35
4.	"Salix and His Soil"	4:08
5.	"Lingering Eyes"	4:31
6.	"Dissensions" (feat. Luster)	4:12
7.	"Limitations"	3:01
8.	"The Sound of His Daughter"	4:05
9.	"The Sun Will Open Its Core"	3:47
10.	"We Are There Together" (feat. Beth Hirsch)	4:11
11.	"Odd Forms"	4:06
12.	"Vivid Dream"	5:06
Total length:		48:51

==== Lingering Pt. II (2018) ====
No.	Title	Length
1.	"4th Drawer Down"	3:33
2.	"The Mind Still Travels"	4:10
3.	"The Fallen Barriers Parade"	3:45
4.	"Moving Cluster"	4:56
5.	"Renhoh 93"	1:27
6.	"Outcast Gatherings"	3:37
7.	"Push the Walls Aside"	3:57
8.	"Towering Trees"	3:19
9.	"Echoing Childhood"	4:31
Total length:		33:15

==== Heap of Ashes (2022) ====
No.	Title	Length
1.	"It Won't Be Cinematic"	3:35
2.	"Tide"	4:55
3.	"Spider Cracks"	4:22
4.	"Moldering Fragments" (feat. Sound of Ceres)	4:33
5.	"No. 3147"	4:53
6.	"Labyrinth"	2:51
7.	"Parched Bodies"	5:08
8.	"Pagan Flames"	4:41
9.	"Needle" (feat. GNOM)	6:58
Total length:		41:56

=== Singles ===
- "A Dark God Heart" (2010)
- "Remixes" (2011)
- "Chin" (2012)
- "Gazing at the Moon" (2012)
- "In Another World" (2014)
- "Floating Blood of Mine" (2014)
- "The Missing Steps" (2017)
- "Fainting Spell" (2017)
- "The Sun Will Open Its Core" (2017)
- "4th Drawer Down" (2018)
- "The Mind Still Travels" (2018)
- "The Fallen Barriers Parade" (2018)
- "Moving Cluster" (2018)
- "Renhoh 93" (2018)
- "Outcast Gatherings" (2018)
- "Tide" (2022)
- "Spider Cracks" (2022)
- "It Won't Be Cinematic" (2022)

== Critical notes ==
The Current wrote: "As band names go, Sleep Party People is pretty apt. This Danish five-piece – who wear rabbit masks on stage to overcome shyness – create music for the early hours, when you're about to go to sleep but you've got a nice mug of tea to finish first. Combining a love of ambient music and old instruments, Sleep Party People draw on the post-rock soundscapes of Mogwai and Sigur Ros, with pretty melodies building to brutal climaxes."
