= The Comeback Kid (album) =

Studio album by Marnie Stern
- Released: November 3, 2023
- Genre: Math rock; post-punk
- Length: 28:24
- Label: Joyful Noise
- Producer: Marnie Stern

Marnie Stern chronology
The Chronicles of Marnia (2013)	The Comeback Kid (2023)

Singles from The Comeback Kid
- 1. "Plain Speak" Released: August 30, 2023

The Comeback Kid is the fifth studio album by American musician Marnie Stern, released on November 3, 2023, through Joyful Noise Recordings. It is her first album in 10 years, following 2013's The Chronicles of Marnia. The album received acclaim from critics.

== Background ==
On August 30, 2023, Marnie Stern announced the release of her fifth studio album, along with the first single "Plain Speak".

== Critical reception ==
Professional ratings
Aggregate scores
Source	Rating
Metacritic	85/100
Review scores
Source	Rating
AllMusic	4.5/5 stars
Exclaim!	7/10
Paste	8.1/10
Pitchfork	8.0/10
Uncut	8/10

The Comeback Kid received a score of 85 out of 100 on review aggregator Metacritic based on nine critics' reviews, indicating "universal acclaim". Reviewing the album for AllMusic, Fred Thomas claimed that, "There's a marked feeling of newfound ease that flows through The Comeback Kid. The always unstable elements that make up Stern's sound are still potent and volatile, but gone is any dread or confusion that may have pushed her music forward in the past, replaced by a sense of triumph and euphoric self-acceptance."Uncut remarked that the album "whizzes by in a 28-minute blur of finger-tapped melodies, lopsided time signatures and arrangements that, on tracks like 'Earth Eater' and 'Believing Is Seeing', whip from jazz to glitter to metal with neck-snapping precision". Jezy J. Gray of Paste called it "as urgent and electrifying as anything she's managed in the 16 years since her disarming debut" as well as "a heady mix of restless riffs and nervy rhythms that reveal the steady strokes of a seasoned songwriter".

Allison Hussey of Pitchfork complimented Stern's "pyrotechnic displays of virtuosity", writing that she "lands her adventurous leaps with breathless energy" and "with her triumphant shredding, Stern's howling return is a neon-haloed song of herself". Exclaim!'s Tom Piekarski felt that "fans of Stern's earlier output might be torn on The Comeback Kid. Some will be ecstatic that a master of her craft is back without missing a single beat [while] other listeners will wonder how a decade of playing in a very different musical context could have possibly resulted in a collection of songs that would hardly sound amiss on any previous Marnie Stern record".

== Track listing ==
All tracks are written by Marnie Stern, except "Il girotondo della note", written by Ennio Morricone.

The Comeback Kid track listing
No.	Title	Length
1.	"Plain Speak"	3:14
2.	"Believing Is Seeing"	1:58
3.	"The Natural"	2:48
4.	"Oh Are They"	2:15
5.	"Forward"	1:52
6.	"Working Memory"	3:09
7.	"Il girotondo della note"	1:18
8.	"Til It's Over"	2:31
9.	"Nested"	1:56
10.	"Earth Eater"	3:17
11.	"Get It Good"	1:46
12.	"One and the Same"	2:20
Total length:		28:24
