= Eerie Wanda =

Indie-pop solo project by Marina Tadic

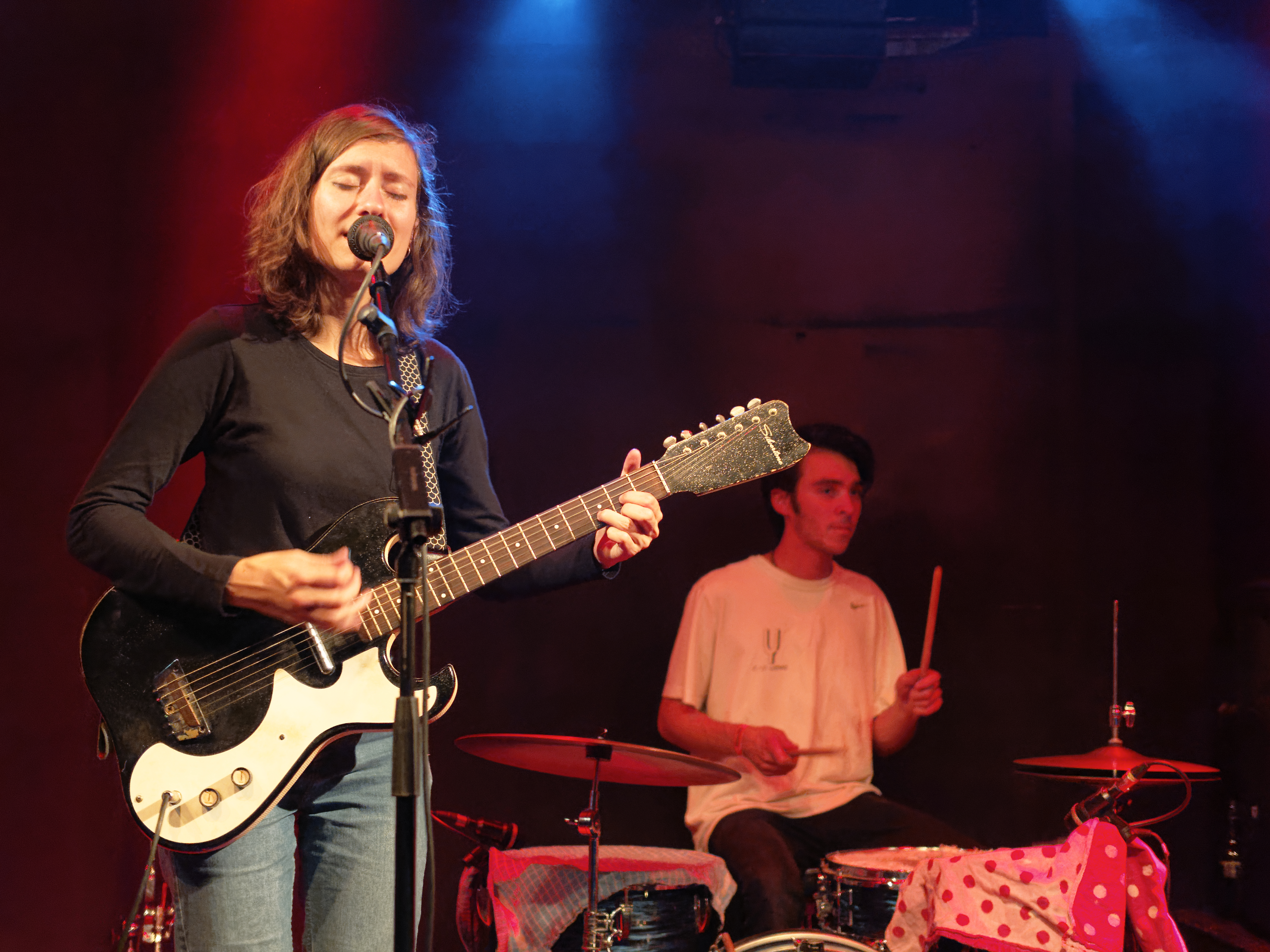

Background information
- Also known as: Marina Tadic
- Origin: Netherlands
- Genres: Indie pop; Dream pop; Shoegaze; Indie
- Years active: 2016–present
- Label: Joyful Noise Recordings
- Members: Marina Tadic
- Past members: Jasper Verhulst, Nic Niggebrugge, Jeroen de Heuvel, Bram Vervaet

Eerie Wanda is the indie pop solo project by the Dutch–Croatian singer-songwriter Marina Tadic. Tadic started writing songs at age 14 when she got her first guitar, and takes an intuitive approach to making music. Various rotating musicians have been a part of the band, including members Jasper Verhulst on bass, Nic Niggebrugge on drums, keyboardist Jeroen de Heuvel, and Bram Vervaet on lead guitar. For their third album, Internal Radio, Adam Harding and producer Kramer were added.

The project was formed when Jasper Verhulst, the bassist for Jacco Gardner and Altın Gün, was sent early demo tapes created by Tadic. Verhulst subsequently started performing bass with her, and Eerie Wanda was eventually formed. The band's debut album, Hum, was released in 2016, with the single 'I Am Over Here' receiving some UK airplay, and a second album, Pet Town, was released in January 2019 on Joyful Noise Recordings. For Pet Town, each band member recorded their respective parts at their homes, and they were remotely pieced together. Tadic said of the process: "I've written the songs in a period of my life in which I was feeling quite alone. I wanted the recording process to feel like that too." The band is part of the Joyful Noise Recordings label.

Marina Tadic released Kidbug's eponymous debut album with Adam Harding (Dumb Numbers), Thor Harris (Swans) and Bobb Bruno (Best Coast) in 2020 on Joyful Noise Recordings.

On June 29, 2022, a new album was announced, Internal Radio. Tadic wrote, created and co-produced the new album with additional parts added by Adam Harding, and co-produced with additional instrumentation added by Kramer (Shimmy-Disc).

== Discography ==
=== Albums ===
- Hum (2016)
- Pet Town (2019)
- Internal Radio (2022)
