= In Advance of the Broken Arm (album) =

Studio album by Marnie Stern
- Released: February 20, 2007
- Genre: Math rock; indie rock; punk rock; avant-pop
- Label: Kill Rock Stars
- Producer: Zach Hill

Marnie Stern chronology
In Advance of the Broken Arm (2007)	This Is It and I Am It and You Are It and So Is That and He Is It and She Is It and It Is It and That Is That (2008)

Professional ratings
Aggregate scores
Source	Rating
Metacritic	79/100
Review scores
Source	Rating
AllMusic	3.5/5 stars
Pitchfork	7.7/10
PopMatters	7/10
Stylus Magazine	A−

In Advance of the Broken Arm is the debut album by Marnie Stern, released in 2007. Kill Rock Stars handled the CD release, and the vinyl with a shorter track listing came out on Rampage Records. The title comes from a work of art of the same title by artist Marcel Duchamp.

== Composition ==
Musically, Arm is math rock and "fully-formed, feminine" indie rock, as well as a "noisy" fusion of punk rock and avant-pop.

== Legacy ==
Arm has garnered admiration in the years since its release. As part of an essay series for Drowned in Sound's 10th anniversary, contributing writer Alexander Tudor wrote glowingly of the album in 2010. He called it "sad & brave & emotionally generous" due to Stern "weav[ing]... her narrative of personal struggle against the odds, and her own mantras of self-affirmation" into it. In 2017, MTV News' Hazel Cills celebrated Arm's 10th anniversary. She praised the musicianship of Stern and drummer Zach Hill as "sound[ing] like nothing else in American indie rock" at the time. About.com placed Arm on their list of the math rock genre's best records.

== Track listing ==
=== CD ===
1. "Vibrational Match" - 3:37
2. "Grapefruit" - 2:47
3. "Every Single Line Means Something" - 3:40
4. "Precious Metal" - 3:10
5. "Put All Your Eggs in One Basket and Then Watch That Basket!!!" - 2:41
6. "Logical Volume" - 3:40
7. "Absorb Those Numbers" - 3:21
8. "This American Life" - 4:05
9. "Letters from Rimbaud" - 3:39
10. "The Weight of a Rock" - 2:30
11. "Plato's Fucked Up Cave" - 3:30
12. "Healer" - 3:29
13. "Patterns of a Diamond Ceiling" - 4:24

=== LP ===
==== Side A ====
1. "Vibrational Match" - 3:37
2. "Grapefruit" - 2:47
3. "Every Single Line Means Something" - 3:40
4. "Precious Metal" - 3:10
5. "Put All Your Eggs in One Basket and Then Watch That Basket!!!" - 2:41

==== Side B ====
1. "Absorb Those Numbers" - 3:21
2. "This American Life" - 4:05
3. "Healer" - 3:29
4. "Patterns of a Diamond Ceiling" - 4:24

== Personnel ==
=== Performers ===
- Marnie Stern: vocals, guitar, keyboards
- John-Reed Thompson: bass, keyboards, organ
- Zach Hill: drums, bass, keyboards, piano

=== Other ===
- Songs written by Marnie Stern, except for "Vibrational Match", which was written by Marnie Stern and Bella Foster
- Arrangements by Marnie Stern and Zach Hill
- Engineering and mixing by John-Reed Thompson at Retrofit Recording, Sacramento, California, with additional engineering by Marnie Stern
- Produced by Zach Hill
- Mastered by John Golden
- Artwork by Bella Foster
