= This Is It and I Am It and You Are It and So Is That and He Is It and She Is It and It Is It and That Is That =

Studio album by Marnie Stern
- Released: October 7, 2008
- Genre: Experimental rock; indie rock; math rock
- Length: 41:08
- Label: Kill Rock Stars
- Producer: Zach Hill

Marnie Stern chronology
In Advance of the Broken Arm (2007)	This Is It and I Am It and You Are It and So Is That and He Is It and She Is It and It Is It and That Is That (2008)	Marnie Stern (2010)

Professional ratings
Aggregate scores
Source	Rating
Metacritic	82/100
Review scores
Source	Rating
AllMusic	4/5 stars
The A.V. Club	B+
Mojo	4/5 stars
Pitchfork	8.3/10
PopMatters	8/10
Slant Magazine	4/5 stars
Spin	3/5 stars
Tiny Mix Tapes	4/5 marks
Under the Radar	7/10

This Is It and I Am It and You Are It and So Is That and He Is It and She Is It and It Is It and That Is That is the second album by Marnie Stern, released on October 7, 2008 on Kill Rock Stars. The album's title comes from an Alan Watts quote in his work On the Taboo Against Knowing Who You Are (1966), which was in turn a quotation from James Broughton's The Bard and the Harper (1965). Broughton also used the quote in his art film This Is It (1971).

Pitchfork named This Is It... the 44th greatest album of 2008.

== Composition ==
Alongside experimental rock and indie rock, This Is It takes on "gleeful, choppy, and ambitious" math rock.

== Track listing ==
1. "Prime" – 2:28
2. "Transformer" – 2:09
3. "Shea Stadium" – 3:38
4. "Ruler" – 3:52
5. "The Crippled Jazzer" – 4:19
6. "Steely" – 4:00
7. "The Package Is Wrapped" – 3:45
8. "Simon Says" – 3:20
9. "Vault" – 3:26
10. "Clone Cycle" – 3:32
11. "Roads? Where We're Going We Don't Need Roads" – 2:59
12. "The Devil Is in the Details" – 3:39

== Personnel ==
- Marnie Stern – vocals, guitar, keyboards
- John-Reed Thompson – bass, keyboards, organ
- Zach Hill – drums, bass, keyboards, piano
