= Sound of Ceres =

US musical group

Background information
- Origin: Fort Collins, Colorado, U.S.
- Genres: Dream pop
- Years active: 2016-present
- Label: Joyful Noise Recordings
- Members: K Hover; Ryan Hover; Jacob Graham; Ben Phelan; Derrick Bozich
- Website: soundofceres.com

Sound of Ceres is an American dream pop collaboration with K and Ryan Hover of Candy Claws at the band's core. After releasing three albums under the moniker Candy Claws, K and Ryan Hover decided to develop a new sound with a new band, founding Sound of Ceres in Fort Collins, Colorado in 2014. Other members include Jacob Graham and Derrick Bozich.

== Discography ==
=== Albums ===
- Nostalgia for Infinity (Joyful Noise Recordings, 2016)
- The Twin (Joyful Noise Recordings, 2017)
- Emerald Sea (Joyful Noise Recordings, 2022)

=== Singles ===
- "Solar Mirror Anthology Vol. 6" (Flannelgraph Records, 2015)
- "Bryn Marina" (Mtn. Observatory Mix)
- "My Spiral Arm"

== Style and reception ==
The style of Sound of Ceres has been described as thought provoking with equal parts intricate and abstract. Their sound has a dream pop quality with "vintage psychedelic motifs." Sound of Ceres explores the wonders of our living planet through the lens of a combination of mid-century lounge music, 1960s pop, 1970s nature documentary soundtracks, 1990s shoe gaze, and modern sampling techniques.

Conceptually and lyrically, the group pulls from an unusually diverse array of influences. Their debut album, Nostalgia for Infinity began as a conceptual retelling of "The Girl from Ipanema" inflected by synesthetic meditations on the central motifs in Proust's Lost Time that echo and refine themes from the 1962 bossa nova pop hit. Described as a response to "the hugeness of time and space," the debut was widely praised by critics and received an 8/10 on AllMusic.

The group's unique work has also garnered attention from notable artists such as Marina Abramović who attended their 2017 residency in Brooklyn, and with whom they collaborated on their album Emerald Sea from 2022. The group opened several shows on Peter Bjorn and John's 2016 tour and opened show for Purity Ring on their 2017 tour.

In 2018, SoC began touring with Beach House, and opened for Morton Subotnick. The light shows accompanying their live performances are, somewhat unusually, controlled and executed by the band-members themselves.
