= Marnie Stern (album) =

Studio album by Marnie Stern
- Released: October 5, 2010
- Genre: Experimental rock, indie rock
- Length: 33:58
- Label: Kill Rock Stars
- Producer: Zach Hill

Marnie Stern chronology
This Is It and I Am It and You Are It and So Is That and He Is It and She Is It and It Is It and That Is That (2008)	Marnie Stern (2010)	The Chronicles of Marnia (2013)

Professional ratings
Aggregate scores
Source	Rating
Metacritic	81/100
Review scores
Source	Rating
AllMusic	4.5/5 stars
The A.V. Club	B+
Drowned in Sound	8/10
The Guardian	5/5 stars
musicOMH	4.5/5 stars
NME	7/10
Pitchfork	7.9/10
PopMatters	8/10
Spin	7/10
Sputnikmusic	4/5

Marnie Stern is the third album by Marnie Stern, released on October 5, 2010, on Kill Rock Stars. The first single, "For Ash" was released July 26, 2010.

== Track listing ==
1. "For Ash" – 4:27
2. "Nothing Left" – 2:57
3. "Transparency Is the New Mystery" – 2:56
4. "Risky Biz" – 3:16
5. "Female Guitar Players Are the New Black" – 3:12
6. "Gimme" – 4:11
7. "Cinco de Mayo" – 3:16
8. "Building a Body" – 3:02
9. "Her Confidence" – 3:08
10. "The Things You Notice" – 3:34
11. "Break You (Bonus Track)" – 0:50
12. "Heroy Hope (Bonus Track)" – 4:15
13. "If You Look Into The Abyss (Bonus Track)" – 2:36
14. "Marco Polo (Bonus Track)" – 3:32
15. "Seven Collective (Bonus Track)" – 2:26

== Personnel ==
- Marnie Stern – vocals, guitar, keyboards
- Matthew Flegel – bass, keyboards, organ
- Lars Stalfors – keyboards
- Zach Hill – drums, bass, keyboards, piano
