= Spring Grove (album) =

Studio album by the Ophelias
- Released: April 4, 2025
- Genres: Indie rock, indie folk
- Length: 41:11
- Label: Get Better Records
- Producer: Julien Baker

The Ophelias chronology
Crocus (2021)	Spring Grove (2025)

Professional ratings
Review scores
Source	Rating
New Noise	4/5
The Skinny	5/5

Spring Grove is the third full-length album from American indie rock band the Ophelias. The album was released on April 4, 2025, via Get Better Records. The album was produced entirely by Julien Baker.

== Track listing ==
All tracks are written by Spencer Peppet.

Crocus track listing
No.	Title	Length
1.	"Open Sky"	2:56
2.	"Spring Grove"	3:06
3.	"Cumulonimbus"	3:01
4.	"Vulture Tree"	3:33
5.	"Salome"	2:18
6.	"Parade"	3:59
7.	"Cicada"	3:18
8.	"Forcefed"	3:03
9.	"Crow"	2:21
10.	"Gardenia"	3:46
11.	"Sharpshooter"	2:04
12.	"Say to You"	3:54
13.	"Shapes"	2:52
Total length:		41:11

== Personnel ==
Credits adapted from Tidal.

=== The Ophelias ===
- Mic Adams – drums, percussion
- Andrea Gutmann Fuentes – violin
- Spencer Peppet – vocals, guitar (all tracks); piano (tracks 1, 2, 10), synthesizer (1, 2, 12)
- Jo Shaffer – bass guitar

=== Additional contributors ===
- Julien Baker – production (all tracks), background vocals (tracks 1, 2, 5, 6, 12), guitar (3, 5, 8, 11), piano (4, 6), synthesizer (4), banjo (10, 13)
- Ryan Schwabe – mastering
- Calvin Lauber – mixing, recording
- Mia Berrin – background vocals (track 4)
