= Stranger Cat =

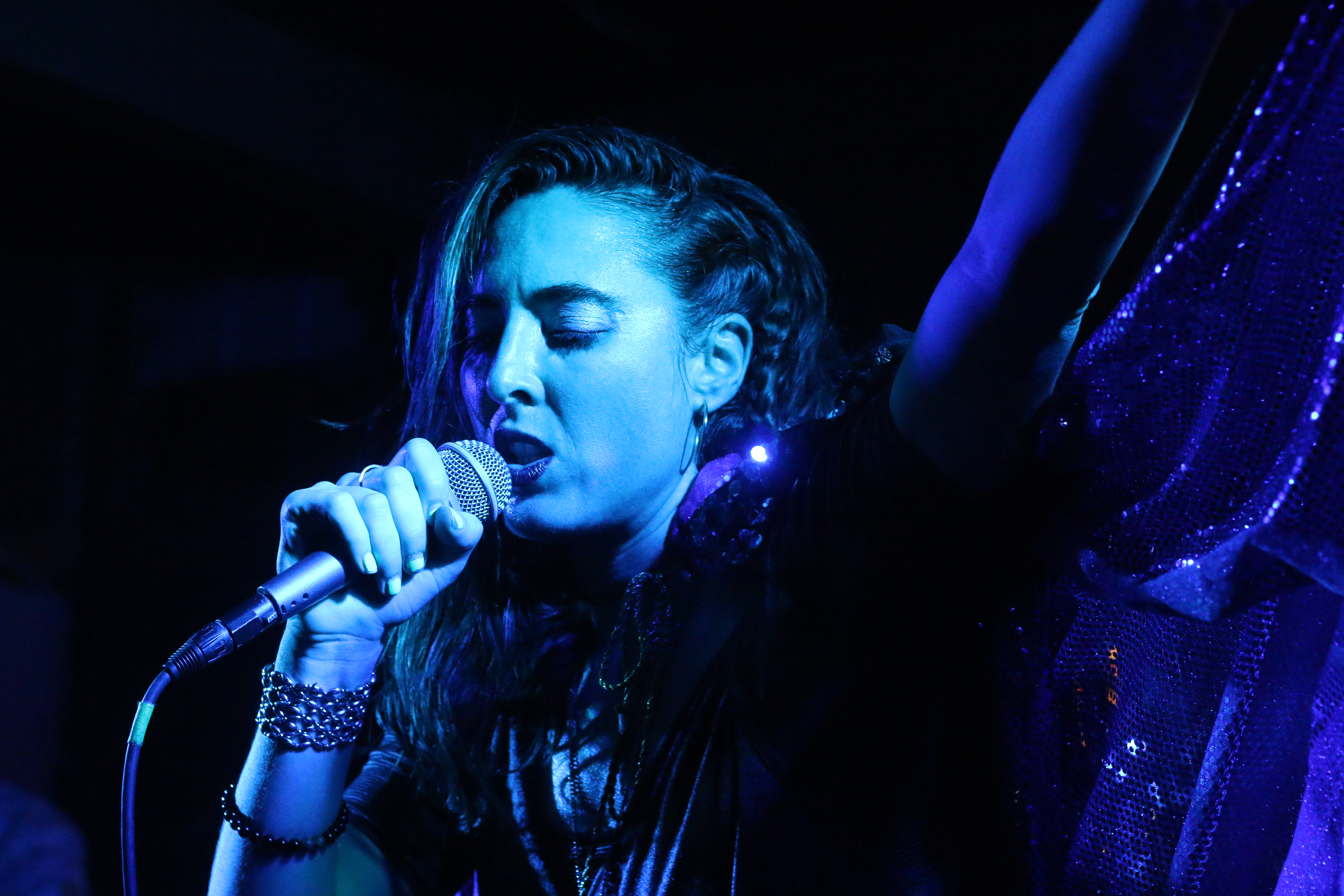
- Stranger Cat performing at the Joyful Noise 2015 SXSW Showcase

Background information
- Origin: Brooklyn, New York
- Genres: Indie pop, R&B, electronic, experimental
- Label: Joyful Noise Recordings
- Members: Cat Martino
- Past members: Sven Britt

Stranger Cat is the electronic music project of Cat Martino on the Indianapolis independent label, Joyful Noise Recordings. Martino has established herself by touring with many artists such as Sharon Van Etten, as well as long-time friend Sufjan Stevens. For Stranger Cat's debut record "In the Wilderness," the song "Sirens" was cited as "a bright, grand pop song born in the dark" by NPR's All Songs Considered.

== Biography ==
Stranger Cat is a musical project from Cat Martino. The Brooklyn native was Sufjan Stevens’ right hand woman for Age of Adz and All Delighted People albums and world tour, recorded/toured with Sharon Van Etten circa Epic, she sings on the new Son Lux record Lanterns, appeared with The Shins on SNL and Williamsburg Park. She has opened tours in US or EU for Marissa Nadler, Indians, Night Beds, Rufus Wainwright, Black Rebel Motorcycle Club, Patrick Watson, Gardens and Villa and more.

In 2012, Cat retreated from Brooklyn to spend the winter in the Sierra Foothills, writing and recording new songs. Joined by co-producer and multi-instrumentalist Sven Britt, each of them recorded and produced each other in the making of "In The Wilderness."

The music video for the album's lead single, "Sirens," debuted on NPR First Watch.

== Discography ==
=== Studio albums ===
- In the Wilderness (2015) - Joyful Noise

=== Singles ===
- Fig Tree / Sirens (2015) – Joyful Noise
