= Kidbug =

American supergroup

- Origin: Amsterdam, Austin, Indianapolis, Los Angeles
- Genres: Alternative rock, grunge
- Years active: 2018–present
- Labels: Joyful Noise Recordings
- Members: Marina Tadic; Adam Harding; Thor Harris; Bobb Bruno
- Website: https://www.joyfulnoiserecordings.com/products/kidbug

Kidbug is an international supergroup composed of musicians signed to Joyful Noise Recordings. The project was conceived of by Marina Tadic (Eerie Wanda) and Adam Harding (Dumb Numbers). They are joined by Thor Harris (Swans), and Bobb Bruno (Best Coast, Pocahaunted). Dale Crover (Melvins, Nirvana et al.) plays drums on the final track of their eponymously titled full-length studio-album debut.

== Origin ==
Kidbug was originally conceived as a project in December 2018, during Joyful Noise Recordings annual Christmas party and holiday album recording sessions. "We all convened at Postal Recording in Indianapolis to record Christmas songs for the label, and it just sort of grew from there," Harding explains.

Each year musicians on the label are flown in to record unusual covers, homages, satires or deconstructions of various holiday standards prior to the label's yearly party. In 2018, Adam Harding and Thor Harris participated in the recording of nearly every track. Harding and Tadic's work together on the opening track ("Listen the Snow is Falling") led to a collaboration on a video (Harding is also a videographer), which in turn catalyzed a long-distance correspondence of "musical love-letters" ultimately blossoming into a romance and musical collaboration that crystallized into Kidbug over the following year. Tadic says of this period: "The writing started when I went back home. We were both very inspired to start writing songs to each other. It's a funny thing because we're both really slow at songwriting, but for some reason the songs just kept flowing. Within two months or so we had enough to make an album."

The songs were originally composed by Harding about Tadic, and by Tadic about Harding in a kind of epistolary collage. "Kidbug is a true collaboration," Tadic explains. "I have never really been able to write a song with another person. But together we did it effortlessly, like we were one person."

== Influences ==
Harding lists some of their musical antecedents: "We love Nirvana, My Bloody Valentine, The Jesus and Mary Chain, Pixies, Sonic Youth, and all that is definitely an influence."

The term "cuddlebug sludge" to describe the group's music was originally coined by Spin to describe Dumb Numbers (another project of Harding's) in 2013. "But (the term) feels even more fitting for Kidbug," according to Harding. "I've often referred to Dumb Numbers as a collaboration, but for the most part I write all the songs and then ask friends to play on them. But writing Kidbug songs with Marina is a dream and feels so effortless".

== Discography ==
=== Albums ===
- Kidbug (2020)

=== Singles ===
- "Theme From Kidbug"(2020)

=== Music videos ===
- "Theme From Kidbug"(2020)
- "Dreamy"(2020)
- "Together"(2020)
- "Good Inside"(2020)
