= Ceres & Calypso in the Deep Time =

Studio album by Candy Claws
- Released: June 25, 2013
- Genres: Dream pop; shoegaze; noise pop
- Length: 44:12
- Label: twosyllable
- Producer: Ryan Hover

Candy Claws chronology
Hidden Lands (2010)	Ceres & Calypso in the Deep Time (2013)

Ceres & Calypso in the Deep Time is the third and most recent album by the American dream pop band Candy Claws, with lyrics provided by the poet Jenn Morea. It was released on June 25, 2013, through twosyllable. It is a concept album about a seal-like beast, Ceres, and her human partner, Calypso, questing through the Mesozoic Era together. The album's title alludes to the Roman goddess Ceres and the Greek nymph Calypso.

== Background and composition ==
Motivated by a future trip to Bates College where the correspondence of Rachel Carson and Dorothy Freeman is housed, poet Jenn Morea had the idea of finding music related to Carson's works to accompany her in this experience. Morea discovered Candy Claws' debut album In the Dream of the Sea Life, which was inspired by Carson's book The Sea Around Us. She later contacted band member Ryan Hover, and two months later, they made the decision to collaborate on the next Candy Claws album, for which Morea would provide lyrics in the form of poems. Hover shared with her the main idea for the album: "The story would take place during the Mesozoic Era and there would be 12 songs total with 4 songs representing each of the 3 time periods: Triassic, Jurassic and Cretaceous".

The album is accompanied by fragments of a document titled “Blood Ark”, supposedly discovered by Hans-Dieter Sues in 1980 alongside the fossil of a Zephyrosaurus. The document depicts the adventures of Ceres the White Seal (performed by Karen Hover) and Calypso the Girl (performed by Hank Bertholf) as they journey through the Deep Time (represented by Ryan Hover). For Morea, Ceres and Calypso represent the story of the friendship between Carson and Freeman, inspired by the letters they sent to each other.

Morea listened to ten rough mixes that the band had sent to her; she also studied visual representations of the era, recreations of dinosaur sounds, documentaries, and read the band's previous lyrics to create continuity among their works. After Morea finished the lyrics, she allowed the band to choose which would be the chorus for each song. In order to emphasize the nature of the collaboration, each track contains two titles: the first one represents the lyrics and the second one, in parentheses, the music.

New York City composer Bryan Senti provided orchestral arrangements on several tracks, built from a Philip Glass sample library. Hover explains the heavy usage of compression on the album as follows: "[...] we sent them back to the Mesozoic and the effects of time dilation, dimension inversion, instant fossilization, and magnetic thaw took their toll on the frequencies".

Ceres & Calypso was released on June 25, 2013; weeks later, on July 19, the band also released a "dual mono" instrumental version of the album. This version, lacking the extensive compression found on the standard version of the album, pans the rhythm section of each song to the left channel, and the melodic section to the right, similar to many of the Beatles' original stereo recordings.

== Critical reception ==
Professional ratings
Review scores
Source	Rating
AllMusic	4.5/5 stars
Consequence of Sound	C+
Diffuser.fm	7/10
Monkeybuzz	7/10
Pitchfork	7.6/10

Pitchfork critic Ian Cohen considered Ceres & Calypso as "certainly one of 2013's more unique records" and "immersive listening experience, but also a claustrophobic one". Cohen also further wrote: "It all leads to Ceres & Calypso feeling like concrete evidence of their [Candy Claws'] hippie cred, chock full of fantastic ideas and lacking just enough follow through". Philip Cosores of Diffuser.fm said that the record's "forward-thinking, intellectual, challenging, post-Animal Collective music doesn’t belong to these times" and stated that the band's "genre-hopping, while remaining true to their earthy psychedelic aesthetic, is enjoyable for any listener with the patience to take an indirect trip".

In a more mixed review, Consequence of Sound's Adam Kivel wrote that the album "would seem perfectly suited for a brain-melting, painstakingly detailed animated film, both in story and in its evocative soundtracking potential". Kivel also concluded: "Though often too big to fully comprehend, Ceres & Calypso is the kind of album you wish you could get lost in, perhaps by opening up a wardrobe and climbing right in".

== Track listing ==
No.	Title	Length
1.	"Into the Deep Time (One Sun)"	3:02
2.	"White Seal (Shell & Spine)"	3:44
3.	"Fell in Love (At the Water)"	4:01
4.	"Pangaea Girls (Magic Feeling)"	3:12
5.	"New Forest (Five Heads of the Sun)"	3:24
6.	"Transitional Bird (Clever Girl)"	4:26
7.	"Charade (Fern Prairie)"	3:20
8.	"Fallen Tree Bridge (Brave Rainbow Rider)"	3:30
9.	"Birth of the Flower (Seagreen)"	3:47
10.	"Illusion (Fern Lake)"	3:35
11.	"Night Ela (Mystic Thing)"	5:04
12.	"Where I Found You (One Star)"	3:07
Total length:		44:12

- On some releases, "Charade (Fern Prairie)" and "Illusion (Fern Lake)" are instead titled "Fern Prairie (Charade)" and "Fern Lake (Illusion)"

== Personnel ==
Album personnel as adapted from Bandcamp:

Candy Claws

- Hank Bertholf — performance
- Karen Hover — performance
- Ryan Hover — performance, production

Other personnel

- Jenn Morea — lyrics
- Bryan Senti — orchestration (1, 3, 5, 7, 9, 12)
