= I Love You (Yah Tibyah La Blu) =

American rock band

- Also known as: Yah Tibyah La Blu
- Origin: Chicago, Illinois, United States
- Genres: Indie rock; Alternative rock
- Years active: 2004–present
- Labels: Joyful Noise; We Be Friends Records
- Members: Justin Randel
- Past members: Kevin Kesterson; Jeffrey Schlette; Charlie Mylie

I Love You is a recording act fronted by Justin Randel that is based in Brooklyn, New York. Formed in 2004 as a trio, the project used various names until late in that year when Yah Tibyah La Blu (a slightly bastardized translation of "I Love You" in Russian) became "official." For practical reasons, the group began using the English phrase by the release of their first recordings.

In 2006, bassist Kevin Kesterson departed, making a duo of the group. Then in 2008, drummer Jeffrey Schlette parted ways with I Love You, making Randel the sole member. In 2009, video artist Charlie Mylie joined up with Randel, throwing psychedelic visuals into the mix during live performances. During October of that year the duo released their first recording for Indianapolis, Indiana's Joyful Noise Recordings, Bell Ord Forrest.

In 2008, I Love You became a solo act again. According to his MySpace page, frontman Justin Randel released Feeling Bad To Feel Better in October 2011 on CD and cassette. In 2014, after previous member Jeffrey Schlette died, Justin Randel changed his moniker to Reaches.

== Reception ==
Jason Harper in The Pitch called the band "promising" as it "thrashes about in the secret playroom between punk and indie rock, ... crafting paradoxically sloppy and intricate experimental pop." Harper continued, "Randel's polyrhythmic guitar loops distract the listener while Schlette gradually builds a hip-jerking beat that climaxes in frantic, shouted vocals and disco-ball-slicing riffs. It's crazy danceable, but only if you're crazy."

Gabriel Keehn of Tiny Mix Tapes wrote, "the sense of legitimate, fresh tinkering-for-the-sake-of-tinkering and corner-of-the-sandbox fun here is genuine, but this has surely been done before, and it's been done a lot better" in giving the CD Drone, Drugs and Harmony three out of five stars.

Simon Lewis and Stefan Ek of Terrascope wrote of Bell Ord Forrest, "Here’s the most charming music ... It’s rhythmic and polyrhythmic, it’s like Talking Heads or B52 being converted into this millenniums Now People. It’s happy and it’s inventive. It’s Party!"

== Discography ==
- 2006: Six Trick Pony (CD) self-release
- 2006: Davan/I Love You (12 inch split) self-release
- 2008: Drone, Drugs and Harmony (CD and tape) self-release
- 2009: Bell Ord Forrest (CD and tape) Joyful Noise
- 2011: Feeling Bad To Feel Better (CD and tape) Pecan Crazy Records
- 2013: Pseudodoxia (Vinyl, CD and tape) We Be Friends Records
- 2016: I am Alive and Well (Vinyl, CD and tape) We Be Friends Records
- 2019: Wherever the Internet Goes, Sorrow Follows (Vinyl, CD and tape) We Be Friends Records
