= Mythless =

MYTHLESS
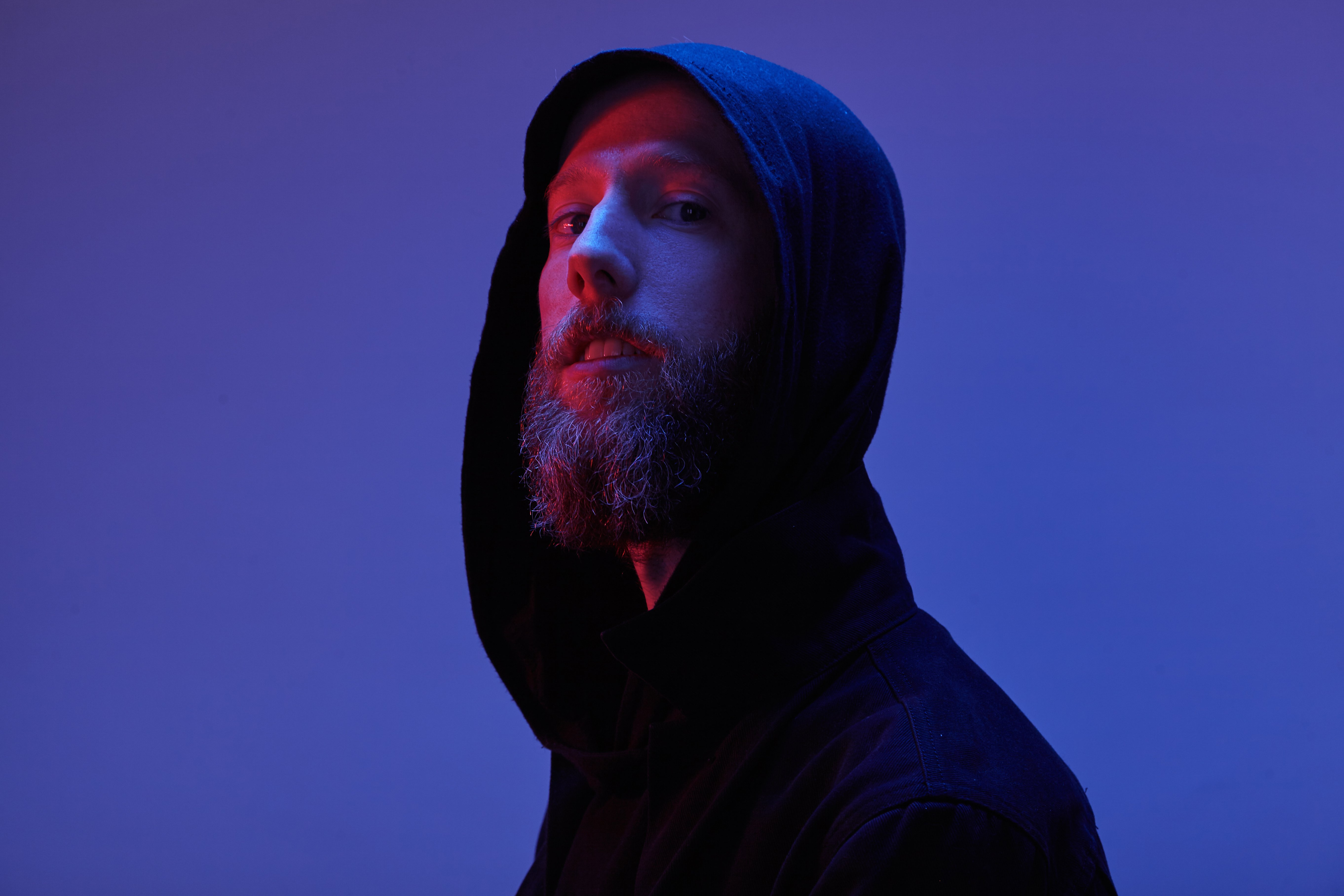
- Jason Bartell (AKA Mythless)

Background information
- Born: Jason Bartell; New Hampshire
- Years active: 2005–present
- Label: Joyful Noise Recordings

Jason Bartell (AKA Mythless) is an American musician, multi-instrumentalist, singer-songwriter and visual-artist who came to prominence as a guitarist and songwriter for Fang Island. After Fang Island quietly disbanded in 2015, he began to produce new music as Mythless, signing with Joyful Noise Recordings and releasing his first solo-EP ("Patience Hell") in March 2018.

“Once things slowed down [with Fang Island] and eventually stopped, it became more imperative for me to have an outlet, so I started to focus on Mythless. The experience pushed me to a new place where I would be responsible for everything myself. I enjoyed that freedom.” Fellow Fang Island alumni Marc St. Sauveur and Nicolas Andrew Sadler joined him on the drums and bass, and along the way, he incorporated an expansive aural palette, including “a maximal hard and fast element with harpsichord and lush keyboards to offset the wall of guitars." It "exists at the intersection between trance-metal and meditative hardcore."

In addition to working on Mythless, Bartell continues to produce visual art. He's stated that material appearing on his debut EP was influenced by groups and individuals ranging from The Stranglers, Radiohead, Kate Bush, the Smashing Pumpkins, Canada, the Toronto Blue Jays, to a performance by Boychild and Korakrit Arunanondchai, the latter of whom directed the video for "Statue", which appears as the third track on the Patience Hell EP.

== Discography ==
EPs

Title	Album details
Patience Hell EP	Release date: March 16, 2018; Label: Joyful Noise Recordings
We EP	Release date: February 4, 2022; Label: Joyful Noise Recordings

Singles

Title	Details
Dosed	Release date: June 25, 2019; Label: Joyful Noise Recordings
