= Marnie Stern =

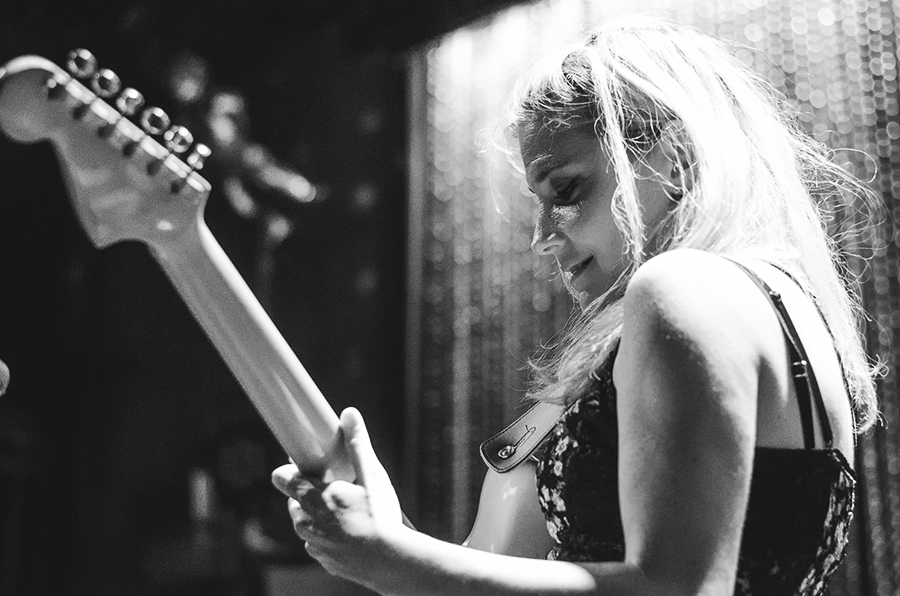
- Stern performing in Philadelphia, May 9, 2014

Background information
- Born: March 18, 1976 (age 49)
- Origin: New York City, U.S.
- Genres: Experimental rock; noise rock; math rock; indie rock
- Occupations: Musician; singer-songwriter
- Instruments: Vocals; guitar
- Years active: 2007–present
- Labels: Joyful Noise; Kill Rock Stars
- Formerly of: The 8G Band

Marnie Stern (born March 18, 1976) is an American musician, singer-songwriter, and guitarist. She has garnered acclaim for her technical skill and tapping style of guitar play. Stern was a member of The 8G Band from the show Late Night with Seth Meyers.

== Musical career ==
In early 2007, Kill Rock Stars released Stern's debut CD, In Advance of the Broken Arm. It was well received by critics, and most favorably by The New York Times, citing it as "The year's most exciting rock 'n' roll album." In mid 2007, Stern toured the U.S. and UK with Hella's Zach Hill and The Advantage's Robby Moncrieff, in support of her debut album. In 2008, Stern was named one of Venus Zine's "Greatest Female Guitarists of All Time", Spring 2008 issue and was nominated "Female Artist of the Year" and "Punk Album of the Year" for the 2008 Plug Music Awards.

Stern's second album, This Is It and I Am It and You Are It and So Is That and He Is It and She Is It and It Is It and That Is That, was released October 7, 2008. Upon release, it garnered the title of "Best New Music" as well as No. 44 on "The 50 Best Albums of 2008" from Pitchfork Media. Stern toured Europe and the U.S. in support of This Is It with former U.S. Maple guitarist Mark Shippy, bassist recruit Malia James, and a varying line-up of drummers.

Backed by bass player Nithin Kalvakota and former Tera Melos drummer Vincent Rogers, Stern spent most of 2010 and 2011 touring North America, Europe, and Australia in support of her self-titled third album. Highlights include several winter festivals in Europe as well as support dates with the Flaming Lips. She was chosen by Les Savy Fav to perform at the ATP Nightmare Before Christmas festival that they co-curated in December 2011 in Minehead, England. In 2011, Stern was named one of Elle Magazines "12 Greatest Female Electric Guitarists", and was chosen as a voter on a panel of top guitarists and other experts for the Rolling Stone Magazine "100 Greatest Guitarists List". In 2012, she was named No. 87 on the Spin Magazine list of "100 Greatest Guitarists of all Time".

In December 2012, it was announced that her next album The Chronicles of Marnia would be released on Kill Rock Stars. The title track of the album was debuted that same week on the website of Spin Magazine in an article about Stern. On March 4, 2013, The Chronicles of Marnia was made available exclusively on NPR's First Listen. During 2013's SXSW she was featured in ABC News' 7 Emerging Artists on the Rise article. Stern started off as a fill-in guitar player for Late Night with Seth Meyers' 8G Band when bandleader Fred Armisen was absent, and then became a full time member of the Late Night house band until 2022.

In August 2023, Stern announced her return with a song titled "Plain Speak". It features on her fifth studio album, The Comeback Kid, which was released on November 3 via Joyful Noise Recordings. Rolling Stone named Marnie Stern as one of "The 250 Greatest Guitarists of All Time".

== Influences ==
Stern has cited many musical influences that contribute to her sound, including Hella, King Crimson, Lightning Bolt, Deerhoof, Erase Errata, Yoko Ono, Don Caballero, U.S. Maple, Royal Trux, Television, Bruce Springsteen, The Who, and Talking Heads.

== Discography ==
=== Albums ===
- In Advance of the Broken Arm (Kill Rock Stars, 2007)
- This Is It and I Am It and You Are It and So Is That and He Is It and She Is It and It Is It and That Is That (Kill Rock Stars, 2008)
- Marnie Stern (Kill Rock Stars, 2010)
- The Chronicles of Marnia (Kill Rock Stars, 2013)
- The Comeback Kid (Joyful Noise Recordings, 2023)
