= The Ophelias (Ohio band) =

American rock band

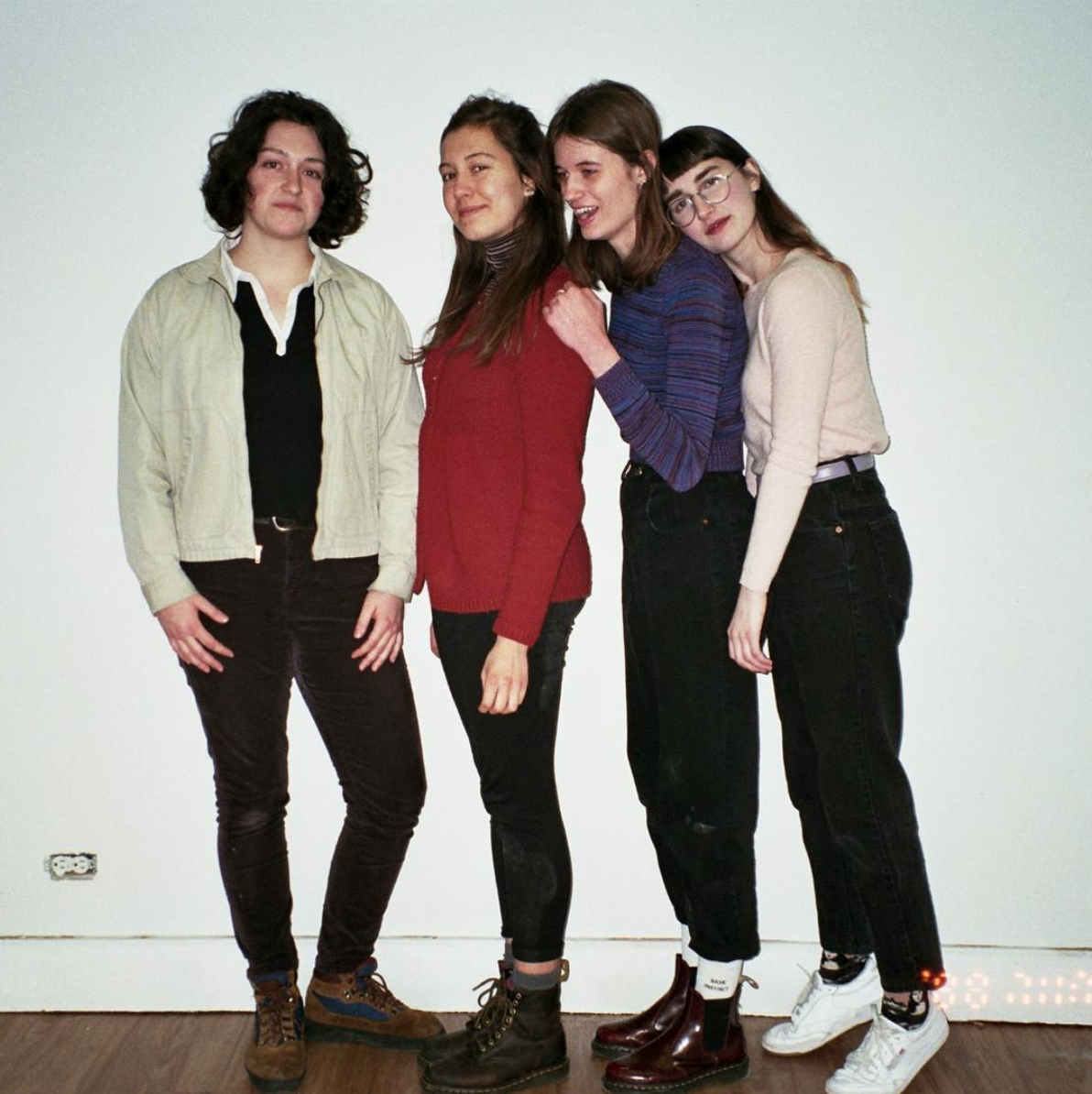
- The Ophelias, c. 2018

Background information
- Origin: Cincinnati, Ohio
- Years active: 2015–present
- Label: Joyful Noise Recordings
- Members: Mic Adams; Andrea Gutmann Fuentes; Spencer Peppet; Jo Shaffer
- Past members: Grace Weir
- Website: Bandcamp

The Ophelias are an American rock band from Cincinnati, Ohio. The group first met at a time when each were independently serving as the "token girl" in various male-fronted bands from their hometown. "Coming from varied musical backgrounds (ranging from garage-rock, to surf, to opera), the distinct talents and influences of each member collided in unexpected ways at the band's first rehearsal. It was here the band discovered that their chemistry wasn't rooted in a shared musical reference point, but in the creative relief from the expected censorship of being a side person."

In 2015, Yoni Wolf of Why? saw the band playing at a Fourth of July festival in Cincinnati. "There they were— The Ophelias: four teenage girls up on a temporary stage, playing, what to me at the time, sounded like a mix between Velvet Underground, underground British psych-noise-folk-rock from the late ‘90s / early 2000s (think Hood, Movietone, Crescent), and some kind of softer side of punk..."

Wolf submitted their debut LP, Creature Native, to Joyful Noise Recordings' White Label Series, and it made the cut. Creature Native became the first entry released through the series. In the summer of 2018, The Ophelias went on tour with the Low Anthem. The group's second full-length album, Almost (produced by Yoni Wolf), followed in July 2018; with its first single "Fog", premiering at Stereogum and the video for "Lunar Rover" premiering at New Noise Magazine.

The Ophelias' third album, Crocus, was released in 2021, and featured Julien Baker on the song "Neil Young on High".

== Discography ==
=== Albums ===
- Creature Native (2015)
- Almost (2018)
- Crocus (2021)
- Spring Grove (2025)

=== EPs ===
- For Luck (2020)
- Ribbon (2024)

=== Singles ===
- Mermaid-Like - Low/These Days (2015)
- Night Signs (2017)
- Fog (2018)
- General Electric (2018)
- Lunar Rover (2018)
- Grand Canyon (2020)
- Last Christmas (2020)
- Neil Young on High (featuring Julien Baker) (2021)
- Sacrificial Lamb (2021)
- Vapor (2021)
- Twilight Zone (2021)
- Silver and Gold (2021)
