= Talk Normal =

- Genres: Noise Rock
- Years active: 2007–present
- Label: Joyful Noise Records
- Members: Andrya Ambro; Sarah Register
- Website: https://talknormal.bandcamp.com/

Talk Normal is an alternative/indie rock duo from Brooklyn, New York, consisting of Sarah Register and Andrya Ambro. Their music has been compared to the No Wave movement of the 1980s; although both members have stated it was not a sound they intentionally tried to emulate.

== History ==
Ambro and Register, who are both sound engineers, became friends while attending college at NYU. While recording an album for a band called Antonius Block, Ambro began to play drums for the group. When Antonius Block expressed their need for another guitarist, Register voiced her interest in joining the group. Ambro and Register's shared musical taste led to the formation of the musical duo, Talk Normal.

In 2007, Talk Normal released their first EP, a four-song cassette released by Night People Records. In 2008, Talk Normal self-released their second EP, Secret Cog. In 2009, the music duo released their first full-length album on Rare Book Room Records titled Sugarland.

In 2010, Talk Normal and Lower Dens collaborated and released a cassette split on Impose records. In 2011, Talk Normal released a split with Christy & Emily on Klangbad records on a 7” vinyl. Talk Normal also did a split with Thurston Moore that same year; the split was released as a 7” vinyl on Fast Weapons records. Talk Normal and Moore were also featured on the annual 7” series by Joyful Noise Records, “Cause and Effect”.

2012 saw the release of Sunshine under Joyful Noise Recordings.

== Reviews ==
Pitchfork Media gave Sugarland a 7.8 rating, saying that the band's affluence for “thick noise” and “rhythmic tension” had not "waned". Pitchfork also reviewed Sunshine, ranking it a 7.7, saying, "Sunshine cranks things up a notch", and highlighting Talk Normal's ability to make simple words and basic sounds morph into something larger.

== Discography ==
Albums

- Sunshine – Joyful Noise Records – 2012
- Sugarland – Rare Book Room Records – 2009

Extended Plays

- Secret Cog – Self-released – 2008
- 4-Song Cassette – Night People Records – 2008

Splits

- Split w/ Thurston Moore – Joyful Noise Records – 2013 – 7”
- Split w/ Thurston Moore – Fast Weapons – 2011 – 7”
- Split w/ Christy & Emily – Klangbad – 2011 – 7”
- Split w/ Lower Dens – Impose – 2010 – Cassette
