= Mike Adams At His Honest Weight =

American indie rock band

- Origin: Bloomington, Indiana, U.S.
- Genre: indie rock
- Years active: 2011–present
- Labels: St. Ives Records; Flannelgraph Records; Joyful Noise Recordings; Burnt Toast Vinyl; Sounds Familyre; Jurassic Pop; Mind Over Matter; Kingfisher Bluez
- Members: Mike Adams
- Website: www.mikeadams.info

Mike Adams At His Honest Weight is an indie rock band from Bloomington, Indiana. They have been active since 2011 and have released albums on St. Ives Records, Flannelgraph Records, Joyful Noise Recordings, Burnt Toast Vinyl, Sounds Familyre, Jurassic Pop, and Kingfisher Bluez.

== History ==
=== Oscillate Wisely (2011) ===
Oscillate Wisely is the debut album from Mike Adams At His Honest Weight. Originally released jointly in 2011 by St. Ives and Flannelgraph Records on 200 vinyl LPs, Flannelgraph records reissued the album on cassette on 2016. It was recorded by Mike Adams, mixed by Adam Jessup, and mastered by Eric Day.

Press

Amazon.com named Oscillate Wisely one of its "Editor's Picks" on the day it was released, and later called single, "Bad Weather", one of the "50 best mp3s of 2011"

Styrofoam Drone called Oscillate Wisely, "gorgeous" and said, "Adams manages to balance the album with smart and intelligent indie rock that sometimes gets noisy, and on the other side comes all the stranger, darker stuff from the left side of the field".

=== Best of Boiler Room Classics (2014) ===
Best of Boiler Room Classics is the second album from Mike Adams At His Honest Weight, jointly released by Flannelgraph Records and Joyful Noise Recordings in 2014. Best of Boiler Room Classics was co-produced by Mike Adams and Adam Jessup.

Press

American Songwriter named lead single "I'm Worried" #47 on their list of "Top 50 songs of 2014".

Ian Cohen, writing for Pitchforkmedia.com, said of "I'm Worried", "even as he spins slack, major-key melodies, you sense it's the most powerful coping device he's got. With "I'm Worried", Mike Adams at His Honest Weight creates a song of extremely deceptive heft".

And Stephen Deusner, also writing for Pitchfork, said in the album's review that, "Boiler Room Classics is shot through with deep nostalgia and an even deeper melancholy, as though Adams’ true subject is the fleeting nature of happiness, the impermanence of family and friends". Pitchfork gave the album a rating of 7.8 on a 10 point scale.

=== Casino Drone (2016) ===
Casino Drone is the 3rd full-length album from Mike Adams At His Honest Weight. It was released on CD and LP in 2016 by Joyful Noise Recordings. Drums for the album were recorded at Sleepwalk Recording by Eric Day. They were recorded at double speed on a Tascam 8-track, and then slowed down to "normal" speed for overdubbing. The album was mixed and co-produced by Adam Jessup.

Press

According to Nerdist.com, in their online premiere of Casino Drone, "with an earnest voice he sings through a constant flux of emotions, negotiating guitar harmonies that oscillate frequently between major and minor keys... The 11-song LP is rife with examples like these."

Aquarium Drunkard says, on Casino Drone, "pleasures are frequent, from the palm-muted chunk-chunks of “Diem Be” to the shimmering, synth dappled “Bronze Worlds,” and the album's final stretch, featuring the languid “Keep My Heart Alive” bleeding into ambient washes and motorik pop on “Ideas Man,” indicates that even when Adams strays from conventional power pop, he retains his homespun appeal. Highly recommended"

In their May 2016 new release preview, the AV Club claimed, "Mike Adams should’ve been on The Ed Sullivan Show. There's something delightfully vintage about the Midwestern songwriter's signature style of power pop, which he sings with swaying hips and a twinkle in his eye. If this were 1964, teen girls would be screaming for it."

NPR Music said of Casino Drone's lead single, Bronze Worlds, "The swirling, dreamy atmospherics and subdued melodies hint at his love of the obscure (Starflyer 59) and the renowned (The Beach Boys), creating something unique in the process."

Razorcake had this to say about the album; "Adams is great at throwing down some legit melodies and grooves. Most of the album is cool, genuine, and relaxed"

Allmusic.com said, "the album is the work of a true craftsman with a unique style"

About lead single, Bronze Worlds, Brooklyn Vegan says, "It's a bold pop song, with vocals pushed to the forefront and a backbone that's closer to The Cars than to My Bloody Valentine"

== Discography ==
Studio albums

- Oscillate Wisely (2011)
- Best of Boiler Room Classics (2014)
- Best of Boiler Room Classics (Instrumentals) (2014)
- Casino Drone (2016)
- There is no Feeling Better (2019)
- Graphic Blandishment (2022)

Singles

- That's It, Cus b/w Talk Too Much (2011)
- Not No More (2013)
- Caught On (50 Bands & A Cat For Indiana Equality Compilation) (2015)
- By the Time I Get to Phoenix (Jimmy Webb Tribute) (2015)
- I'm Worries b/w Ken Burns' Baseball (2015)
- Bronze Worlds (Liquorice Newtman Version) 2016)
- The Lucky One (Sun Pavilion Version) (2016)
- Hey Santa (Joyful Noise Holiday Party, Vol. 2 Compilation) (2018)
- Turn Our Love Around b/w Stay, Too (2018)
- The New Big Ending (2019)
- Quartermaster’s Wintertime (2019)

Splits

- Sing Starflyer 59 Split 10" (with Candy Claws) (2012)
- Heavyweights EP Split 7" (with Sleeping Bag) (2013)
- Tasteful Nudes Split 7" (with Starflyer 59) (2015)
- Old Toy Trains Split 7" (with Mick Foley) (2016)
- Cause & Effect Split 7" (with Mac McCaughan) (2017)
- Split Split 7" (with Honey Radar) (2017)

EPs

- Preparation Age (2015)
- Daytrotter Session (Live) (2015)
- Steals The Hits Off Country Beauties (2017)
- Aquarium Drunkard Lagniappe Session (2019)

== Tan Van Tour Talk Podcast ==
In 2014, the members of Mike Adams At His Honest Weight began recording a daily podcast in their van while on tour. The name of the show, Tan Van Tour Talk, was conceived of and voted on in episode 1. Each distinct set of tour dates is considered a new "Season" of Tan Van Tour Talk. There have been over 100 episodes and 21 seasons so far.
