= Tall Tall Trees (band) =

American vocalist and banjo player

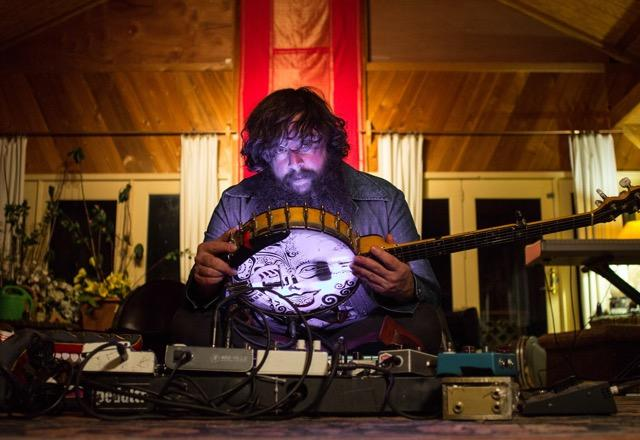

Background information
- Origin: Long Island, New York
- Genres: Indie folk, experimental, psychedelic, bluegrass
- Instrument: Banjo
- Years active: 2009-present
- Label: Joyful Noise Recordings
- Members: Mike Savino
- Website: talltalltrees.com

Tall Tall Trees is the musical pseudonym of vocalist and multi-instrumentalist banjo player Mike Savino. Though occasionally joined by collaborators, Savino usually performs as a "one-man psychedelic indie-folk orchestra" when playing as Tall Tall Trees. He is acknowledged as a pioneer in the world of experimental banjo music. The name of the project was inspired by the George Jones-Roger Miller song of the same name.

Savino calls his home-brewed, custom-built instrument/equipment set-up the "Banjotron 5000." He built it himself in order to be able to solo at live-shows. He runs his banjo "through a slab of effects pedals and loopers, bowing, drumming, and strumming out multi-textured arrangements to support his lyrically driven songs."

Stylistically, Tall Tall Trees as a, "a vital collision between Elliott Smith and Rogue Wave" or compared to, "a new age Cat Stevens with dreamy harmonies." Influenced by Deer Tick and Fleet Foxes, Tall Tall Trees is most easily classified as "indie-folk" but the scope of Savino's formal experimentation and the complexity of the soundscapes created trouble the boundaries of this easy genre-definition.

== Background ==
Born in Long Island, Savino played bass guitar and sax in his younger days. He studied the jazz double bass at The New School. Touring in South America, and a more general exposure to world music during this period catalyzed Savino's love of folk music. After experimenting with a banjo he'd picked up while touring, he "took to it and started working on songs that would become the 2009 eponymous debut of Tall Tall Trees, released on Savino's own Good Neighbor Records." This debut was followed by his more introspective sophomore album Moment.

Savino toured extensively to promote Moment, performing solo at most of the gigs. During this phase, Savino also became a regular in Kishi Bashi's touring band, playing his custom banjo and singing backup on multiple tours. Tall Tall Trees' 2014 EP, The Seasonal, showcasing the expanded use of the banjo he'd evolved and empowered, inflecting his sound with a new and more distinctly psychedelic ambience.

In 2015, Savino worked as the caretaker of a vacant health resort surrounded by forest in Georgia for several months. Taking advantage of the solitude, he went to work on Tall Tall Trees third full-length album, Freedays. Although the album was conceived as a solo-effort, Savino enlisted the help of Kishi bashi and drummers Philip Mayer and Claude Coleman, Jr.(Ween) for finishing touches. Tall Tall Trees signed with Joyful Noise Recordings in the autumn of 2016, releasing Freedays in early 2017.

Wave of Golden Things, Savino's fourth full length was recorded in 2019 and features Asheville, North Carolina musicians Micah Thomas on drums, Simon Thomas George on keyboards, Jackson Dulaney on pedal steel and Stephanie Morgan, Brie Capone, and Louisa Stancioff on backing vocals. It was released on January 31st, 2020.

In 2023, Tall Tall Trees released two albums, Stick to the Mystical I, recorded with longtime collaborator Josiah Wolf on drums and synthesizer, as well as the psychedelic banjo opus Ponder Machine with JD Pinkus. Both albums were mixed by legendary producer Kramer with the latter being released on his Shimmy Disc label.

== Discography ==
=== Albums ===
- Ponder Machine (with JD Pinkus) (2023)
- Stick to the Mystical I (2023)
- A Wave of Golden Things (2020)
- Freedays (2017)
- Moment (2012)
- Tall Tall Trees (2009)

=== EPs ===
- The Seasonal (2014)
- The Sound Sanctuary (with Kishi Bashi) (2026)
