= Wendy Eisenberg =

Studio album by Wendy Eisenberg
- Released: April 3, 2026
- Genres: Folk rock; country pop
- Length: 43:52
- Label: Joyful Noise
- Producers: Wendy Eisenberg; Mari Rubio

Wendy Eisenberg chronology
Viewfinder (2024)	Wendy Eisenberg (2026)

Wendy Eisenberg is the eighth album by the American musician Wendy Eisenberg, released on April 3, 2026, through Joyful Noise Recordings. The album received universal acclaim from music critics.

== Background and development ==
Following the release of Viewfinder in September 2024, Eisenberg began working on a new record with producer Mari Rubio, with whom they live and work in Brooklyn. While the two exchanged ideas regarding production, Eisenberg largely wrote the record independently, often beginning the process by simply "improvising a riff on guitar". The album stems from a period of self-growth, inspired by their past experiences, including moving to New York City in 2020 and meeting Rubio. Songs on the album often find Eisenberg addressing their younger self, referencing issues including post-traumatic stress disorder and sexual assault. The album documents Eisenberg's "journey toward self-acceptance" following a break-up.

== Critical reception ==
Professional ratings
Aggregate scores
Source	Rating
AnyDecentMusic?	8.0/10
Metacritic	89/100
Review scores
Source	Rating
Paste	B+
Pitchfork	8.2/10
The Skinny	5/5 stars
Uncut	4/5 stars
Under the Radar	7.5/10

According to the review aggregator Metacritic, Wendy Eisenberg received "universal acclaim" based on a weighted average score of 89 out of 100 from nine critic scores. The review aggregator Any Decent Music gave it a weighted average score of 8.0 out of 10 from five critic scores.

Jason Greene of Pitchfork awarded the album the Best New Music accolade, describing it as a "daring" record driven by Eisenberg's "compositional intelligence". Greene noted that it examines their "newfound happiness with forensic curiosity and muted wonder". They further called "It's Here" the album's centerpiece, writing that it conveys an atmosphere quintessential to Eisenberg: "quietly euphoric, watchful, alive with anticipation".

Rating the album a perfect five out of five, Patrick Gamble at The Skinny praised the musician's ability to "roam freely without ever losing the thread", incorporating the "restless energy of their avant-garde work into something beautiful". The Quietus's Miloš Hroch called the record "a finely spun album of oneiric country pop and folk rock", featuring a "dreamy and time-shifting sound" that encapsulates themes of "memory and meaning".

Casey Epstein-Gross of Paste described the album as "profoundly hopeful", writing that it serves as a guide to an "uninhibited" state of being, free of "societal expectation and internal self-doubt". Writing for Under the Radar, Austin Saalman noted that Eisenberg created an "intriguing and enjoyable album", with lyrical content that adds "fresh depth to the conversation on worldly existence".

== Track listing ==
All tracks are written by Wendy Eisenberg.

Wendy Eisenberg track listing
No.	Title	Length
1.	"Take a Number"	1:46
2.	"Meaning Business"	4:18
3.	"Old Myth Dying"	5:06
4.	"Another Lifetime Floats Away"	4:34
5.	"It's Here"	4:35
6.	"Vanity Paradox"	6:18
7.	"Curious Bird"	3:43
8.	"The Ultraworld"	5:10
9.	"Will You Dare"	3:43
10.	"The Walls"	4:39
Total length:		43:52

== Personnel ==
Credits are adapted from Tidal.

- Wendy Eisenberg – vocals, guitar, production (all tracks); synthesizer (tracks 1, 4, 7, 8), engineering (1), bass (3, 8), Wurlitzer piano (5, 9), piano (6)
- Mari Rubio – mixing (all tracks), strings (1, 3–5), synthesizer (1, 3, 8), production (2–10), string arrangement (2–6, 8), arrangement (2, 4, 5, 7–10), violin (2, 6, 7, 10), viola (2, 6), engineering (3, 8, 10), pedal steel guitar (4, 5, 8, 9), 12-string guitar (10)
- Andrew Weathers – mastering
- Ryan Sawyer – drums (2–10), arrangement (2, 4–10), shaker (4, 8)
- Trevor Dunn – bass, arrangement (2, 4–7, 9)
- Andres Abenante – engineering (2, 4–7, 9)
- Alice Gerlach – cello (2)
- Lester St. Louis – cello (10)
- Lily Wen – engineering (10)
