= Sleeping Bag (band) =

- Origin: Bloomington, Indiana
- Genres: indie rock, alternative
- Labels: Joyful Noise, Musical Family Tree, Warm Ratio, Let's Pretend
- Website: sleepingbag.bandcamp.com

Sleeping Bag is an American alternative/indie rock band based out of Bloomington, Indiana, United States.

== History ==
Sleeping Bag formed in March 2010, when drummer and singer Dave Segedy began playing with bassist David Woodruff and guitarist Lewis Rogers. Segedy had previously performed as a solo artist under the name Whoa Bro Awesome, adding guitar parts for the act's 2008 eponymous EP with Musical Family Tree. In 2011, Sleeping Bag released the self-titled Sleeping Bag through Joyful Noise Recordings; a limited number of digital downloads included a literal sleeping bag. The album featured the single "Slime".

The band's sophomore album, Women Of Your Life, was released in November 2012.

For their third album, Deep Sleep, Dave Segedy enlisted guitarist Tyler Smith and bassist Glenn Meyers; the record was released on Joyful Noise in 2014.

Sleeping Bag has released two collaborations with West Virginia-based Rozwell Kid: Dreamboats, released on Old Flame Records and Jurassic Pop Records in 2013, and Dreamboats 2: A Real Chill Sequel in 2020. Both EPs were co-written and performed by Segedy and Rozwell Kid's Jordan Hudkins.

== Discography ==
- Sleeping Bag (2011, Joyful Noise)
- Women Of Your Life (2012, Joyful Noise)
- Sleeping Bag & Rozwell Kid, Dreamboats (2013, Jurassic Pop/Old Flame Records)
- Deep Sleep (2014, Joyful Noise)
- NBD: Nothing But Demos (2015, Musical Family Tree)
- Wet (2017, Warm Ratio/Let's Pretend Records)
- Sleeping Bag & Rozwell Kid, Dreamboats 2: A Real Chill Sequel (2020)
