= Dumb Numbers =

American rock band

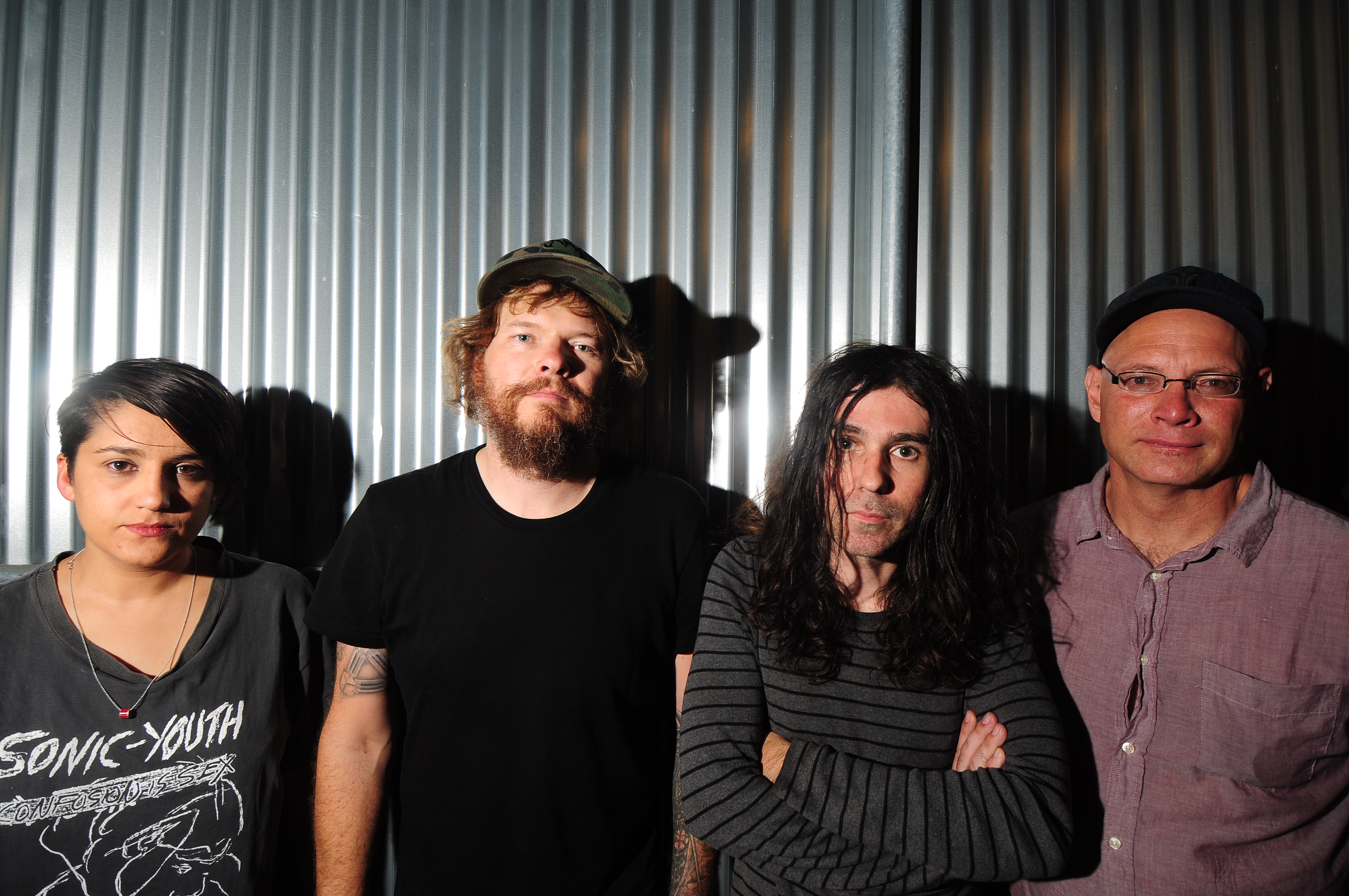

Background information
- Origin: Los Angeles, California, U.S.
- Genres: Indie rock, noise rock
- Years active: 2012–present
- Label: Joyful Noise
- Website: dumbnumbers.com

Dumb Numbers is the musical project of Adam Harding. Harding selects musicians for each Dumb Numbers project from a large group of friends and collaborators.” Lou Barlow, Dale Crover, Bobb Bruno (of Best Coast) and others contributed to the first two studio albums.

Dumb Numbers musical style has been described "swooning feedback pop".

== History ==
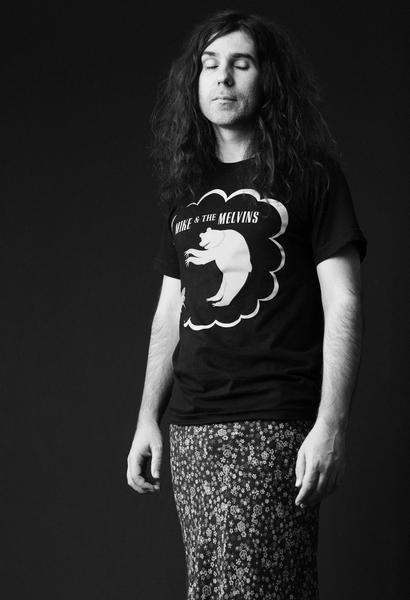
Adam Harding

Harding's native country is Australia. He began making music in the mid-90's. Prior to the debut of Dumb Numbers, Harding was better-known as a videographer (having directed music videos for DJ Shadow, Warpaint, Best Coast, Swervedriver, Sebadoh, Lou Barlow, and Magic Dirt).

The self-titled Debut was released on Joyful Noise Recordings in August 2013, with the single ("Redrum") premiering in the AV Club and in InSound's weekly mixtape. The video for "Redrum", directed by David Yow, premiered in Rolling Stone, and Spin the following month. Reviews of the album were generally positive, citing an atavistic and primal indie-rock sound.

Since that time, Dumb Numbers II, the Stranger EP, and numerous other side-projects and singles have been released.

In addition to his work on Dumb Numbers, Harding also plays in the super-group Kidbug.

== Personnel ==
The list of personnel involved with Dumb Numbers include, but is not exclusive to: Adam Harding, Murph (of Dinosaur Jr.), Bonnie Mercer (Warpaint, Swans), Steve Patrick (Useless Children, Magic Dirt), Lou Barlow (of Dinosaur Jr., Sebadoh, Folk Implosion et al), Dale Crover (of Melvins, Altamont, Nirvana), Toshi Kasai (of Deaf Nephews Studio in Los Angeles), David Yow (of Scratch Acid, The Jesus Lizard, Qui, Flipper), Bobb Bruno (of Best Coast), Thor Harris (Swans, Thor & Friends), Jenny Lee Lindberg (Warpaint) and others.

David Lynch (Blue Velvet, Twin Peaks) did the cover art for the first LP and Malcolm Bucknall provided artwork for the second album. Lynch and Harding released a seven inch split together on Joyful Noise Recordings in 2015. David Yow (Jesus Lizard) directed a video for the debut album's single which appeared at Rolling Stone.

== Discography ==
=== Studio albums ===
Title	Year	Label
Dumb Numbers	2013	Joyful Noise Recordings
Dumb Numbers II	2016	Joyful Noise Recordings

=== EPs ===
Title	Year	Label
Stranger EP	2017	Joyful Noise Recordings
Broken Pipe EP	2020	Joyful Noise Recordings

== Touring ==
The band's roster for live shows fluctuates depending upon the touring schedule of members. Personnel who consistently appear onstage during Dumb Numbers shows include Harding, Murph (of Dinosaur Jr.), Bonnie Mercer, and Steve Patrick. Dumb Numbers toured with the Lemonheads, My Bloody Valentine, and Sebadoh during the latter half of 2013. Reports of the band's live performances on tour were positive. According to the Brooklyn Vegan, "Their sludgy, doom went over pretty good."
