= Dead Rider =

American experimental rock band

- Also known as: D. Rider
- Origin: Chicago, Illinois, United States
- Genre: Experimental rock
- Years active: 2009-present
- Labels: Drag City, Tizona
- Members: Todd Rittmann; Andrea Faught; Matt Espy
- Past members: Noah Tabakin; Theo Katsaounis; Thymme Jones

Dead Rider, formerly known as D. Rider, is an American experimental rock band from Chicago, Illinois. It was created by former U.S. Maple guitarist Todd Rittmann, including Rittmann as guitar and lead vocalist, Andrea Faught on trumpet and keyboard, Thymme Jones on keyboard, and Matt Espy on drums.

== History ==
Dead Rider formed in 2009. Their third album, Chills on Glass, was released by independent record label Drag City in 2014. It premiered on the website of High Times magazine.

== Works ==
Studio albums

- Mother of Curses (Tizona Records, 2009)
- The Raw Dents (Tizona Records, 2011)
- Chills On Glass (Drag City, 2014)
- Crew Licks (Drag City, 2017)
- Dead Rider Trio featuring Mr. Paul Williams (Drag City, 2018)

Singles

- "The Walk Slow" (Joyful Noise Recordings, 2013)

Videos

- "Body to Body (to Body)"
- "Two Nonfictional Lawyers"
- "Mother's Meat"
- "Touchy"
- "The Pointed Stick"
- "Blank Screen"

== Reviews ==
- Dead Rider - "Mother's Meat" (The Raw Dents) | Jon Treneff | Dusted Magazine | 2011.5.10 | review
- Chicago band Dead Rider to bring 'end of civilization' rock to Kalamazoo | Mark Wedel | MLive | 2011.3.25 | review of Touchy
- D. Rider - Mother of Curses | Joshua Klein | Pitchfork | 2009.4.20 | review
- Dead Rider, "The Raw Dents" | Joe Gross | Spin | 2011.5.23 | review
- D. Rider – "Mother of Curses" LP – Tizona Records (Album As Art #64) | The Gumshoe Grove | 2011.3.28 | review
- Q&A: Dead Rider | Lauren Zens | Alarm Magazine | 2011.7.25 | interview with Todd Rittmann

== See also ==
- U.S. Maple
