= Nostalgia for Infinity =

Studio album by Sound of Ceres
- Released: March 4, 2016
- Genre: Indie rock, shoegaze
- Length: 43:42
- Label: Joyful Noise Recordings
- Producer: Pete Lyman, Craig Morris

Sound of Ceres chronology
Nostalgia for Infinity (2016)	The Twin (2017)

Professional ratings
Review scores
Source	Rating
AllMusic	4/5 stars
PopMatters	4/5 stars

Nostalgia for Infinity is the debut studio album by Sound of Ceres. It was released on 4 March 2016 by Joyful Noise Recordings. The album title is derived from the name of a starship in the Revelation Space series by Alastair Reynolds.

== Track listing ==
No.	Title	Length
1.	"Pursuer"	5:26
2.	"Bryn Marina"	3:42
3.	"Ember Age"	5:19
4.	"My Spiral Arm"	5:19
5.	"Hand of Winter"	4:54
6.	"Side A"	4:56
7.	"You're Me"	3:35
8.	"Kingfisher"	4:32
9.	"Antiprism"	1:06
10.	"Dagger Only Run"	5:04
Total length:		43:42

== Reception ==
In his review for AllMusic, Tim Sendra wrote: "Nostalgia for Infinity is dream pop at its finest and Sound of Ceres have made the kind of debut album that should earn love and respect from all corners of the indie rock world"
