= Fang Island (album) =

Album by Fang Island

Studio album by Fang Island
- Released: February 23, 2010 (Europe); June 7, 2010
- Recorded: 2009
- Studio: Machines With Magnets - Pawtucket, Rhode Island
- Genre: Indie rock, progressive rock, math rock
- Length: 31:27
- Label: Sargent House
- Producer: Keith Souza, Fang Island

Fang Island chronology
Sky Gardens (EP) (2008)	Fang Island (2010)	Major (2012)

Professional ratings
Review scores
Source	Rating
Absolute Punk	(86 %)
Consequence of Sound	4/5 stars
Pitchfork Media	(8.3/10)

Fang Island is the debut self-titled studio album by indie rock band Fang Island. It was released in 2010 on Sargent House. The album received favorable reviews from critics, with Pitchfork listing it under "best new music".

== Track listing ==
1. "Dreams of Dreams" - 1:57
2. "Careful Crossers" - 2:51
3. "Daisy" - 3:19
4. "Life Coach" - 2:57
5. "Sideswiper" - 4:13
6. "The Illinois" - 2:27
7. "Treeton" - 3:28
8. "Davey Crockett" - 5:47
9. "Welcome Wagon" - 2:49
10. "Dorian" - 1:39
