= Rozwell Kid =

American indie rock band

- Origin: Martinsburg, West Virginia, United States
- Genres: Indie rock, power pop, alternative rock, emo
- Years active: 2011–present
- Labels: SideOneDummy, Infinity Cat Recordings, Broken World Media
- Members: Jordan Hudkins; Adam L. Meisterhans; Devin Donnelly; Sean Hallock
- Website: www.rozwellkid.com

Rozwell Kid is an American indie rock band formed in 2011 in West Virginia, United States. They released their first studio album on Broken World Media and their most recent album on SideOneDummy.

== History ==
Rozwell Kid began in 2011 with the release of an album titled The Rozwell Kid LP.

In February 2013, Rozwell Kid released their second album titled Unmacho. In October 2013, Rozwell Kid released a split with Sleeping Bag titled Dreamboats.

In November 2014, Rozwell Kid released their third LP titled Too Shabby, which featured guitar solos approved by Lee Hartney of The Smith Street Band.

In March 2015, Rozwell Kid released an EP titled Good Graphics. On June 23, 2015, Rozwell Kid released a split with The World Is a Beautiful Place & I Am No Longer Afraid to Die titled Fourteen Minute Mile.

In June 2017, Rozwell Kid released an album titled Precious Art, their first album on SideOneDummy. The album received positive reviews from numerous publications, with an average review score of 80 on Metacritic based on seven reviews. The album went on to reach the 13th position on the Billboard Heatseekers Albums chart, as well as 24th on the Vinyl Albums chart and 39th on the Independent Albums chart.

== Band members ==
- Jordan Hudkins - Vocals/Guitar
- Adam L. Meisterhans - Guitar
- Devin Donnelly - Bass/Vocals
- Sean Hallock - Drums/Percussion
- Derrick Brandon - Guitar (touring)
- Ben Gauthier - Guitar (touring)

== Discography ==
=== Studio albums ===
- The Rozwell Kid LP (2011, Broken World Media)
- Unmacho (2013, Broken World Media)
- Too Shabby (2014, Broken World Media)
- Precious Art (2017, SideOneDummy Records)

=== EPs and splits ===
- Rozwell Kid/Sleeping Bag - Dreamboats (2013, Jurassic Pop)
- The World Is a Beautiful Place & I Am No Longer Afraid to Die/Rozwell Kid/Kittyhawk/Two Knights - Sundae Bloody Sundae (2014, Skeletal Lightning)
- Rozwell Kid/The World Is a Beautiful Place & I Am No Longer Afraid To Die - Fourteen Minute Mile (2015, Broken World Media)
- Good Graphics (2015, Infinity Cat Recordings)
- Rozwell Kid/Sleeping Bag - Dreamboats 2: A Real Chill Sequel (2020, self-released)
- Rozwell Kid - Grand Canyon (2023, self-released)
