= Fang Island =

American indie rock band

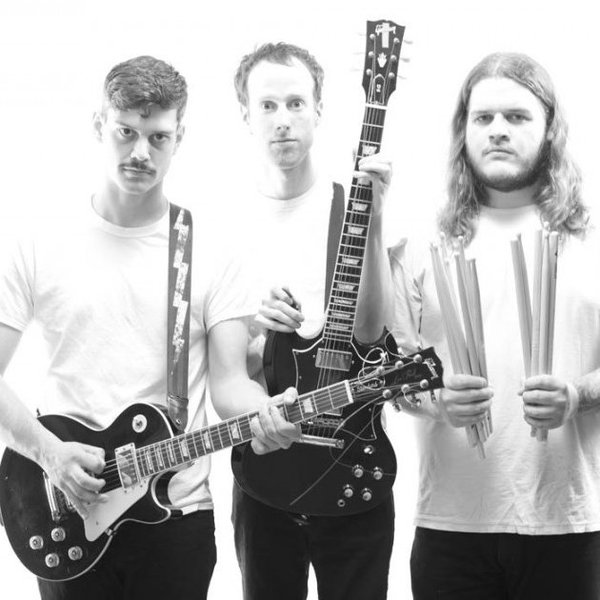

Background information
- Origin: Providence, Rhode Island; Brooklyn, NY, US
- Genres: Indie rock, progressive rock, math rock, post-rock, instrumental rock
- Years active: 2005–2015
- Label: Sargent House
- Past members: Jason Bartell; Chris Georges; Marc St. Sauveur; Nicholas Andrew Sadler; Philip Curcuru; Pete Watts
- Website: www.fangisland.com

Fang Island was an American indie rock band formed in Providence, Rhode Island, and based in Brooklyn, New York City. The group consisted of the guitarists Jason Bartell and Chris Georges, the bass guitarist Brock Hengin and the drummer Marc St. Sauveur.

== Biography ==
Fang Island began in 2005 as an art project with original members, Philip Curcuru, Chris Georges and Pete Watts, while attending Rhode Island School of Design. They were later joined by Bartell, St. Sauveur, Jacober and the guitarist Nick Sadler, a former member of the band Daughters. Fang Island took its name from an article in The Onion. Bartell recalled, "I think it was just a funny blip about Donald Rumsfeld having a secret hideaway, and it was on Fang Island."

The band describes its sound as "everyone high-fiving everyone" and their goal, according to Bartell, is to "make music for people who like music".

The band independently released Day of the Great Leap in 2007, followed by an EP, Sky Gardens, in November 2008. Their song "The Absolute Place" was remixed by Chris Keating of Yeasayer in 2009. Fang Island was named one of the year's top 10 albums by Brian Cook of The Stranger. The album's lead single "Daisy", which has an electro-organ introduction and chanted vocals, was played during a series of commercials promoting the MTV reality show The Buried Life. Adam Pfleider of AbsolutePunk described it as a "wild party" that "listeners will want to relive ... over and over again". Dan Goldin of Decoy Music praised the album for "successfully combining the luster of indie pop music with the technical eccentricities of progressive rock". Ian Cohen in Pitchfork Media called the music on Fang Island "honest and life-affirming and infectious". In 2010, Fang Island performed at the SXSW music festival in Austin, Texas, and were named by the social networking analytics site Next Big Sound as the artists who experienced the fastest growth in online fandom during the festival. While in Austin, the band also recorded three songs for a Daytrotter session. Fang Island entered the Billboard Heatseekers Albums chart in April 2010.

In a 2012 interview with New York Music News, Bartell admitted the happy undertones of the band's music, saying, "I am pretty ding-dong-doodily-delighted, all the time."

Their song "Chompers" from the album Major is a playable track on the video game Rocksmith 2014

Bartell began to produce new music as Mythless.

== Band members ==
- Jason Bartell – guitar, vocals (2005–2015)
- Chris Georges – guitar, keyboards, vocals (2005–2015)
- Philip Curcuru – bass guitar, vocals (2005–2011)
- Pete Watts – drums (2005–2009)
- Nicholas Andrew Sadler – guitar, keyboards, vocals (2007–2011)
- Marc St. Sauveur – drums, vocals (2009–2015)

== Discography ==
Albums

Year	Album details	Peak chart positions
Year	Album details	U.S. Heat
2010	Fang Island: Release date: February 23, 2010; Label: Sargent House	27
2012	Major: Release date: July 24, 2012; Label: Sargent House	11

Singles

- Starquake (2024, Joyful Noise)
- Pattern on the Wall ft. Andrew WK (2024, Joyful Noise)

EPs

Year	EP details
2005	Demo: Release date: 2005; Label: Self-released
2006	Day of the Great Leap: Release date: May 5, 2006; Label: Self-released
2008	Sky Gardens: Release date: March 1, 2008; Label: Corleone Records

Compilation Albums

- Doesn't Exist II: The Complete Recordings (2024, Joyful Noise)

== Music videos ==
Year	Title	Director
2009	"Daisy"	Carlos Charlie Perez
2010	"Life Coach"	Carlos Charlie Perez
2010	"Careful Crossers"	ZFCL
2012	"Sisterly"	Behn Fannin
2024	"Starquake"	Chris Georges
