= Joyful Noise Recordings =

American independent record label from Indianapolis, Indiana

Joyful Noise
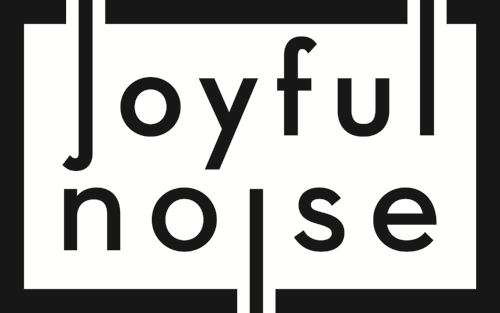
- Founded: 2003
- Founder: Karl Hofstetter
- Distributor: Secretly Canadian
- Genre: Indie rock, alternative rock, experimental, doom metal
- Country of origin: United States
- Location: Indianapolis, Indiana
- Official website: www.joyfulnoiserecordings.com

Joyful Noise Recordings is an independent record label with headquarters in Indianapolis, Indiana. The label was founded in 2003 in Bloomington, Indiana by Karl Hofstetter, who also played drums on several of the label's first releases. Joyful Noise maintains an active roster of over 30 bands playing various musical styles, though according to the label, each artist "in one way or another bridges the gap between pop and noise."

== History ==
In 2010 Joyful Noise began focusing largely on limited-edition specialty releases which are generally released on analog formats packaged with music downloads. In addition to releases on vinyl records, the label has gained notoriety for being at the forefront of the resurgence of cassette tapes and flexi discs, as reported by The Washington Post, Pitchfork Media, Under The Radar, and others.

Joyful Noise has released single-album cassettes from Akron/Family, Dinosaur Jr., Deerhoof, of Montreal, Here We Go Magic, and others, and has released multi-album cassette box sets from Dinosaur Jr., of Montreal, and Joan Of Arc.

In 2012 Joyful Noise released their first album to chart on Billboard: Kishi Bashi's 151a (debuting at #6 on the Heatseekers chart). Since that time, new music on Joyful Noise from artists such as Sebadoh, Dumb Numbers, David Yow, Son Lux, Swamp Dogg, Tropical Fuck Storm, Deerhoof, Why? and others have all charted.

From 2012 to 2016, in the spirit of continuing to explore musical community-building through the release of cult artists in obsolete audio-reproduction formats, Joyful Noise offered its monthly flexi-disc singles series. Each disc in the series is of peculiar and notable value as a rarity but some particularly memorable entries include Son Lux's cover of Jean Ritchie's "Black Waters", several Melvins and Joan of Arc–related tracks, a duet by Sufjan Stevens and Stranger Cat, Tortoise, Don Caballero and Daniel Johnston.

The flexi disc's brief renaissance was the second wave of obsolete-format-driven record sales originally conceived of and innovated by Joyful Noise (after cassette-tapes), later to be duplicated by other labels in the independent music world. JNR is also known for producing lathe-cut records, twelve-sided records, records-that-are-also-musical-instruments and a number of other more bizarre and bespoke musical artifacts.

In 2013, JNR released the first 7" in their Cause & Effect series—an ongoing project pairing JNR artists (appearing on the A-side) with artists who have influenced them (appearing on the B-side).

In 2014, Joyful Noise started their annual Artist-In-Residence program: working with seasoned cult artists to release the "pure-gold material they've got in the cans that's never found a venue for release" and to continue to support their ongoing work. JNR Artists-In-Residence have included: Tim Kinsella (Joan of Arc, Cap'n Jazz et al.), Rob Crow (Pinback, Goblin Cock, Optiganally Yours, et al.), Jad Fair (Half-Japanese), Thor Harris (Swans), Kramer (Shimmy-Disc), Deerhoof, Yonatan Gat + Stone Tapes, Lou Barlow (The Folk Implosion, Sebadoh, Dinosaur Jr.), Yoni Wolf of WHY?, and Danielson of the Danielson Famile.

In 2017, Joyful Noise began releasing their White Label series: undiscovered records selected by renowned musicians either represented or friendly with the label. Yoni Wolf of Why? selected Creature Native by The Ophelias as the first entry in the White Label Series and the band was ultimately drafted to become part of the label's roster. Other curators of the White Label series include Devendra Banhart, Janet Weiss (Sleater-Kinney), Kelley Deal (The Breeders), Mirah, Aesop Rock, Alex Somers, Blanck Mass, Kid Millions, Meredith Graves, Mike Watt, Serengeti, tUNE-yARDs, Astronautilus, Cate Le Bon, Circuit des Yeux, Julianna Barwick, Sondre Lerche, St. Vincent, and Thurston Moore.

== Radical projects & experiments ==
The label is known for candid identification with and support of radical and revolutionary politics. They released collaborations between Bernie Sanders and Thurston Moore, did fundraising to oppose the first Trump Administration through the release of Anal Trump records and stood in solidarity with Black Lives Matter during the George Floyd protests.

In 2020, JNR founded the Church of Noise to build and perpetuate musically empowered community during the COVID-19 pandemic and through the long tail of its fallout. In 2021, the label was featured in the New York Times as the only independent label interviewed in pursuit of a solution to the vinyl manufacturing slowdown (by doing lathe cut previews of vinyl albums that might take six months to a year to make it through the manufacturing queue). The Church of Noise has continued to evolve, building a sonic plant altar in their sanctuary, hosting art shows and other events.

As the major focus of 2022 artist in residence Joyful Noise Recordings devoted resources to launching the sub-label Stone Tapes, an "End of World Music" imprint. Joyful Noise also participated in the resurrection of Shimmy-Disc, run by Kramer, a crucial underground record label responsible for the discovery of a bewildering diversity of now canonical acts such as Low, Gwar, Daniel Johnston, Moldy Peaches and many others.

== Bands ==
=== Current roster ===
- Asher White
- Big Business
- Busman's Holiday
- CJ Boyd
- Cedric Noel
- CocoRosie
- Dale Crover
- David Yow
- Deerhoof
- Divorcee
- Dumb Numbers
- Eerie Wanda
- El Ten Eleven
- Goblin Cock
- Half Japanese
- Helvetia

- Hew Time
- J Fernandez
- Jad Fair
- Jason Loewenstein
- jess joy
- Joan of Arc
- Kidbug
- Kishi Bashi
- KO
- Kramer
- Lil Bub
- Little Moon
- Lou Barlow
- The Low Anthem
- Magic Sword
- Memory Map

- Mike Adams At His Honest Weight
- Mythless
- New Orthodox
- No Joy
- OHMME
- Oneida
- The Ophelias
- Psychic Temple
- Rafter
- Reptar
- Rob Crow
- Richard Edwards
- Sedcairn Archives
- Serengeti
- Sisyphus

- Sleep Party People
- Sound of Ceres
- Suuns
- Stranger Cat
- Swamp Dogg
- Tall Tall Trees
- Tim Kinsella
- Thor Harris
- Toshi Kasai
- Tropical Fuck Storm
- Victor Villarreal
- WHY?
- Wendy Eisenberg
- Yesness
- Yonatan Gat
- Yoni & Geti

=== "Open Relationships" ===
- Akron/Family
- Anal Trump
- Ativin
- Ava Luna
- Birthmark
- Born Ruffians
- Brian Marella
- Built to Spill
- Child Bite
- Chris Cohen
- Cloud Nothings
- Daniel Johnston
- Danielson
- David Lynch
- Dead Rider
- Dinosaur Jr.

- Divorcée
- DM Stith
- Don Caballero
- Eric Gaffney
- Fang Island
- Father Murphy
- Godspeed You! Black Emperor
- Good Fuck
- Hella
- Here We Go Magic
- Jad Fair & Norman Blake
- Japandroids
- The Jesus Lizard
- Jorma Whittaker
- Julianna Barwick
- King Buzzo

- KO
- Le Butcherettes
- Lee Ranaldo
- Make Believe
- Marmoset
- Marnie Stern
- Melvins
- Monotonix
- Mount Eerie
- Natural Dreamers
- of Montreal
- Ought
- Owls
- Pattern is Movement
- Prince Rama

- Protomartyr
- Qui
- Racebannon
- Richard Swift
- The Sea and Cake
- S.M. Wolf
- Son Lux
- Sonny & The Sunsets
- Sondre Lerche
- Sufjan Stevens
- Swaps
- Swirlies
- Talk Normal
- Tera Melos
- Thee Oh Sees

- Thom Fekete
- Thurston Moore
- Tortoise
- The Unspeakable Practices
- Wye Oak
- Yip Deceiver

=== Past roster ===
- Abner Trio
- Berry
- Big Bear
- Bizzart
- Crosss
- The Delicious
- Hermit Thrushes
- Hi Red Center
- I Love You (Yah Tibyah La Blu)
- Jookabox
- Lafcadio
- Man at Arms

- Manners for Husbands
- Melk the g6-49
- Prizzy Prizzy Please
- Push-Pull
- Receptor Sight
- Richard Edwards
- Sebadoh
- Solos
- Stationary Odyssey
- Surfer Blood
- Valina

== Subscriptions and series ==
=== Artist in Residence ===
Starting in 2014, Joyful Noise began hosting artists for year-long residencies in which they release new music exclusively on the label.

- Yonatan Gat & Stone Tapes 2022
- Kramer 2020
- Thor Harris 2019
- Rob Crow 2018
- Deerhoof 2017
- Tim Kinsella 2015
- Jad Fair 2014

=== Flexi-disc series ===
In late 2011 Joyful Noise announced their 2012 Flexi Disc Series, which featured singles from Deerhoof, Jad Fair, Lou Barlow, of Montreal, and others. Each artist contributed a single song which is not available anywhere else. Each flexi disc was limited to 500 copies, and were sold as a monthly subscription. Now in its fourth year, the flexi-disc series has upped its distribution to 1000 copies of each single and grown to include acts such as Cloud Nothings, Sonny & the Sunsets, Lee Ranaldo, Thurston Moore and Sufjan Stevens.

==== 2012 artists ====
- Lou Barlow
- Make Believe
- Jad Fair
- Danielson
- Deerhoof
- Dead Rider
- Rafter
- of Montreal
- Tortoise
- Racebannon
- Akron/Family
- Richard Swift

==== 2013 artists ====
- Birthmark
- Built to Spill & Helvetia
- Hella
- Here We Go Magic
- Melvins
- Mike Adams At His Honest Weight
- Monotonix
- Rob Crow
- Son Lux
- Sufjan Stevens and Cat Martino
- The Sea and Cake
- WHY?

==== 2014 artists ====
- Big Business
- Born Ruffians
- Daniel Johnston
- DM Stith
- Fang Island
- Half Japanese
- Margot & the Nuclear So and So's
- Mount Eerie
- Owls
- Serengeti
- Yip Deceiver

==== 2015 artists ====
- Arousal
- Cloud Nothings
- Deerhoof and Celestial Shore
- Goblin Cock
- King Buzzo
- Lee Ranaldo
- Oneida
- Pattern is Movement
- Protomartyr
- Sonny & the Sunsets
- Tera Melos
- Wye Oak

=== Holiday series ===
Every year Joyful Noise invites commissions some of its bands to contribute to a Holiday album. Contributors to the album submit a video, all of which are compiled into a movie that is shown at the annual Holiday party when the bands are flown in to celebrate. Lathe-cuts of snowflake or spiderweb-shaped records are a frequent artifact of these gatherings, distributed to members and supporters of Joyful Noise projects who have supported the label throughout the year.

== Discography ==
=== 2020s ===
Year	Band	Album	Format	Catalog No.
2024	CocoRosie	Little Death Wishes	Digital, Vinly, cd	JNR480
2024	Yesness	See You At The Solipsist Convention		JNR491
2024	Greg Saunier	We Sang, Therefore We Were		JNR 457
2024	Finom	Not God		JNR 468
2024	Deerhoof	Reveille		JNR 432
2023	jess joy	SOURCEHEIRESS		JNR 465
2023	Kishi Bashi	Music for a Song Film: Omoiyari		JNR 461
2023	Tall Tall Trees	Stick to the Mystical I		JNR 448
2023	Gareth Liddiard	Strange Tourist		JNR 451
2023	Mike Adams at His Honest Weight	Guess for Thrills		JNR 447
2023	Marnie Stern	The Comeback Kid		JNR 441
2023	Deerhoof	The Runners Four		JNR 436
2023	Ativin	Austere		JNR 428
2022	Sleep Party People	Heap of Ashes		JNR 413
2022	Tropical Fuck Storm	Satanic Slumber Party EP		JNR 412
2022	Oneida	Success		JNR 408
2021	Deerhoof	Devil Kids		JNR 406
2022	Yonatan Gat	American Quartet		JNR 402
2022	Medicine Singers	S/T		JNR 401
2022	Mythless	We EP	7"/MP3	JNR 398
2021	Springtime	Self-Titled		JNR 386
2022	Sound of Ceres	Emerald Sea		JNR 397
2021	Deerhoof	Actually, You Can		JNR 377
2021	Helvetia	Essential Aliens		JNR 372
2021	Tropical Fuck Storm	Deep States		JNR 371
2021	The Ophelias	Crocus		JNR 368
2021	Lou Barlow	Reason to Live		JNR 367
2021	jess joy	PATREEARCHY		JNR 361
2021	Suuns	The Witness		JNR 360
2021	Dale Crover	Rat-Tat-Tat		JNR 344
2021	Electric Jesus	Motion Picture Soundtrack		JNR 333
2020	Serengeti	With Greg From Deerhoof		JNR 363
2020	Himmelrum	Van, Dod & Ensomhed		JNR 358
2020	Joan of Arc	Tim, Melina, Bobby, Theo		JNR 353
2020	Deerhoof	Love Lore		JNR 347
2020	Helvetia	This Devastating Map		JNR 343
2020	Various	Safe In Sound: Home Recordings From Quarantine		JNR 342
2020	No Joy	Motherhood		JNR 340
2020	El Ten Eleven	Tautology		JNR 332
2020	Deerhoof	Future Teenage Cave Artists		JNR 331
2020	Ohmme	Fantasize Your Ghost		JNR 330
2020	Let It Come Down	Self-Titled		JNR 329
2020	Magic Sword	Endless		JNR 328
2020	Swamp Dogg	Sorry You Couldn't Make It		JNR 327
2020	Jad Fair + Daniel Johnston	It's Spooky		JNR 321
2020	Toshi Kasai	Plan D		JNR 309
2020	Thor & Friends	4		JNR 307
2020	Psychic Temple	Houses of the Holy		JNR 278

=== 2010s ===
Year	Band	Album	Format	Catalog No.
2019	Mythless	Dosed		JNR 317-1
2019	El Ten Eleven	Self-Titled		JNR 312
2019	WHY?	AOKOHIO		JNR 302
2019	Kishi Bashi	Omoiyari		JNR 301
2019	Tropical Fuck Storm	Braindrops		JNR 299
2019	Mike Adams at His Honest Weight	There is No Feeling Better		JNR 298
2019	Big Business	The Beast You Are		JNR 295
2019	Good Fuck	Self-Titled		JNR 279
2019	CJ Boyd	Kin Ships		JNR 257
2018	Optiganally Yours	OY in HI-FI		JNR
2018	WHY?	Alopecia 10th anniv. re-issue		JNR 270
2018	Swamp Dogg	Love, Loss & Auto-Tune		JNR 269
2018	OHMME	Parts		JNR 268
2018	Hifiklub + Lee Ranaldo	In Doubt, Shadow Him!		JNR 267
2018	The Ophelias	Almost		JNR 265
2018	Joan of Arc	1984		JNR 263
2018	The Low Anthem	The Salt Doll Went to Measure the Depth of the Sea		JNR 255
2018	Mythless	Patience Hell EP		JNR 252
2018	Thom Fekete	Grow		JNR 249
2018	Richard Edwards	Pity Party!		JNR 248
2018	Oneida	Romance		JNR 246
2017	Qui w/ Trevor Dunn	Self-Titled		JNR 238
2017	Surfer Blood	Covers		JNR 237
2017	Dale Crover	Fickle Finger of Fate		JNR 235
2017	Sound of Ceres	The Twin		JNR 234
2017	Deerhoof	Mountain Moves		JNR 233
2017	Anal Trump	To All The Broads I've Nailed Before		JNR 228
2017	Jad Fair, Tenniscoats & Norman Blake	Raindrops		JNR 226
2017	Sleep Party People	Linger		JNR 224
2017	Richard Edwards	Lemon Cotton Candy Sunset		JNR 223
2017	WHY?	Moh Lhean		JNR 222
2017	Surfer Blood	Snowdonia		JNR 220
2017	Joan of Arc	He's Got the Whole This Land Is Your Land in His Hands		JNR 219
2017	Psychic Temple	IV		JNR 217
2016	Dale Crover	Skins		JNR 215
2016	Lou Barlow	Apocalypse Fetish EP		JNR 212
2016	Rafter	XYZ		JNR 207
2016	Goblin Cock	Necronomidonkeykongimicon		JNR 205
2016	Big Business	Command Your Weather		JNR 204
2016	Jad & David Fair	Shake, Cackle & Squall		JNR 203
2016	Busman's Holiday	Popular Cycles		JNR 201
2016	Dumb Numbers	II		JNR 198
2016	Kishi Bashi	Sonderlust		JNR 197
2016	Saqqara Mastabas	Libras		JNR 194
2016	Mike Adams At His Honest Weight	Casino Drone		JNR 193
2016	Crosss	Lo/Obsidian Spectre		JNR 192
2016	Psychic Temple	Psychic Temple Plays Music for Airports		JNR 188
2016	Sound of Ceres	Nostalgia for Infinity		JNR 187
2016	Yoni & Geti	Testarossa		JNR 186
2015	Lil Bub	Science & Magic		JNR 184
2015	Surfer Blood	1000 Palms		JNR 165
2015	J Fernandez	Many Levels of Laughter		JNR 164
2015	Stranger Cat	In the Wilderness		JNR 163
2015	Yonatan Gat	Director		JNR 161
2015	Reptar	Lurid Glow		JNR 160
2014	Serengeti	Kenny Dennis III		JNR 153
2014	Ko	KO EP		JNR 152
2014	Half Japanese	Overjoyed		JNR 151
2014	Kishi Bashi	Lighght		JNR 149
2014	Yonatan Gat	Iberian Passage		JNR 148
2014	Victor Villarreal	Sleep Talk		JNR 145
2014	Divorcee	Snakes and Oyster		JNR 144
2014	Sleeping Bag	Deep Sleep		JNR 141
2014	Son Lux	Alternate Worlds		JNR 139
2014	Mike Adams At His Honest Weight	Best of Boiler Room Classics		JNR 136
2014	Busman's Holiday	A Long Goodbye		JNR 135
2014	Hew Time	Hew Time		JNR 134
2014	Sisyphus	Sisyphus		JNR 132
2014	CJ Boyd	The Space Between Us		JNR 131
2014	Kishi Bashi	Live On Valentines	LP	JNR 130
2013	Tim Kinsella, Marvin Tate, Leroy Bach, Angel Olsen	Tim Kinsella Sings the Songs of Marvin Tate by Leroy Bach Featuring Angel Olsen	LP	JNR 129
2013	Son Lux	Lanterns	LP	JNR 126
2013	of Montreal	Lousy with Sylvanbriar	CS	JNR 123
2013	Son Lux	Tear	7"	JNR 121
2013	Sebadoh	Defend Yourself	LP	JNR 120
2013	DMA	Pheel Phree	LP	JNR 119
2013	WHY?	Golden Tickets EP		JNR 117
2013	David Yow	Tonight You look Like a Spider	LP	JNR 116
2013	Dumb Numbers	Self-Titled	LP	JNR 115
2013	Sebadoh	Secret EP		JNR 114
2013	Thurston Moore, Lou Barlow, David Yow, Talk Normal, Dumb Numbers, and Child Bite	Cause & Effect (vol. 1)	7"	JNR 113
2013	Joan of Arc	Testimonium Songs	CS	JNR 103
2012	Kishi Bashi	Room for Dream	LP	JNR 98
2012	Victor Villarreal / m0ck	Split	7"	JNR 96
2012	Here We Go Magic	A Different Ship	CS	JNR 95
2012	Kishi Bashi	151a	CD/LP	JNR 92
2012	CJ Boyd	West Coasting Vol. 1 - Dreams Like This Must Die (Seattle circa 91)	LP/CS	JNR 91
2012	of Montreal	Paralytic Stalks	CS	JNR 90
2012	Joan of Arc	Joan of Arc Presents: Joan of Arc	LP	JNR 88
2012	Child Bite	Monomania	LP	JNR 87
2012	Jad Fair + Hifiklub + kptmichigan	Bird House	LP	JNR 85
2012	Victor Villarreal	Invisible Cinema	LP	JNR 84
2011	Dinosaur Jr.	Cassette Trilogy	CS	JNR 86
2011	Marmoset	Vinyl Box Set	LP	JNR 83
2011	Marmoset	Today It's You	LP	JNR 82
2011	SWAPS	SWAPS	LP	JNR 81
2011	Sleeping Bag	Sleeping Bag	CD/LP/Sleeping Bag	JNR 80
2011	Dinosaur Jr.	Bug	CS	JNR 79
2011	Joan Of Arc	The Joan of Arc Lightbox Orchestra Conducted by Fred Lonberg-Holm	MP3	JNR 78
2011	Joan Of Arc	Life Like	CS	JNR 77
2011	DMA	Drem Beb	CS	JNR 76
2011	Memory Map	Holiday Band	CD/LP	JNR 75
2011	Jookabox	The Eyes Of The Fly	CD/LP	JNR 74
2011	Akron/Family	Self-Titled II: The Cosmic Birth and Journey of Shinju TNT	CS	JNR 73
2011	Danielson	Best of Gloucester County	CS	JNR 72
2011	of Montreal	Cassette Box Set	CS	JNR 69
2011	Deerhoof	Deerhoof vs. Evil	CS	JNR 68
2011	Joan Of Arc	Oh Brother	LP	JNR 66
2010	Big Bear	See Out	MP3	JNR 71
2010	Big Bear	Under The Beach	MP3	JNR 70
2010	Hermit Thrushes	Wooded Blankets	CS	JNR 67
2010	of Montreal	False Priest	CS	JNR 65
2010	Joan Of Arc	Flowers	CS	JNR 64
2010	Joan Of Arc	Boo Human	CS	JNR 63
2010	Joan Of Arc	Eventually, All At Once	CS	JNR 62
2010	Joan Of Arc	Joan Of Arc, Dick Cheney, Mark Twain	CS	JNR 61
2010	Joan Of Arc	In Rape Fantasy and Terror Sex We Trust	CS	JNR 60
2010	Joan Of Arc	So Much Staying Alive and Lovelessness	CS	JNR 59
2010	Joan Of Arc	The Gap	CS	JNR 58
2010	Joan Of Arc	Live In Chicago, 1999	CS	JNR 57
2010	Joan Of Arc	How Memory Works	CS	JNR 56
2010	Joan Of Arc	A Portable Model Of	CS	JNR 55
2010	Joan Of Arc	Cassette Box Set	CS	JNR 50
2010	Child Bite	The Living Breathing Organ Summer	CD/LP/CS	JNR 57
2010	CJ Boyd	Alternate Roots	MP3	JNR 53
2010	Marmoset	Doo Wop b/w She's Wearing Rings	CS	JNR 52
2010	Berry	Blue Sky, Raging Sun	LP/CS	JNR 49
2010	Prizzy Prizzy Please	Prizzy Prizzy Please	MP3	JNR 48
2010	Prizzy Prizzy Please	Chroma Cannon	CD/LP/CS	JNR 47
2010	Jookabox / Kid Primitive Family	Split	CS	JNR 46
2010	Racebannon	Wrap the Body	LP	JNR 45
2010	Abner Trio	The Giant Crushes You	LP/CS	JNR 42

=== 2000s ===
Year	Band	Album	Format	Catalog No.
2009	Stationary Odyssey	Johnfriend EP	MP3	JNR 44
2009	Stationary Odyssey	Sons of Boy	CD	JNR 43
2009	CJ Boyd	Aerial Roots	CD/LP	JNR 41
2009	Jookabox	Dead Zone Boys	CD/LP	JNR 40
2009	Marmoset	Lemon Meringue Live	MP3	JNR 39
2009	I Love You	Bell Ord Forrest	CD/CS	JNR 38
2009	Child Bite / Big Bear	Split	7"	JNR 37
2009	Hermit Thrushes	Slight Fountain	CD	JNR 36
2009	Marmoset	Tea Tornado	CD	JNR 35
2009	Valina	A Tempo! A Tempo!	CD	JNR 34
2009	Push-Pull	Between Noise and the Indians	CD	JNR 33
2009	Bizzart	Future Stars And Small Wonders	CD	JNR 32
2009	The Delicious	The Delicious The Delicious	CD	JNR 31
2009	Hi Red Center	Assemble	CD/LP	JNR 29
2008	Push-Pull / Prizzy Prizzy Please	PPPPPEP	7"	JNR 30
2008	Various Artists	Joyful Noise 2009 Digital Sampler	MP3	JNR 28
2008	Man At Arms	A Waste Of Time And Space	CD	JNR 27
2008	Grampall Jookabox	Rill Bruh	MP3	JNR 26
2008	Grampall Jookabox	Ropechain	CD/LP	JNR 25
2008	Marmoset	Record In Red	LP	JNR 24
2008	Various Artists	Defunct Indiana	CD	JNR 23
2008	The Delicious	Postcard To My Sewing Circle	CD	JNR 22
2008	LAFCADIO	Kibosh	CD	JNR 21
2007	Child Bite	I Like Friends (Single)	MP3	JNR 20
2007	Push-Pull	3 EP	CD	JNR 19
2007	Child Bite	Gold Thriller EP	CD	JNR 18
2007	Marmoset	Florist Fired	LP	JNR 17
2007	Grampall Jookabox	Scientific Cricket	CD	JNR 16
2007	Child Bite / Stationary Odyssey	Physical Education EP	CD	JNR 15
2006	Stationary Odyssey	Terror on The Hell Loop EP	MP3	JNR 14
2006	Abner Trio / Man At Arms	Self-Titled	CD	JNR 13
2006	Stationary Odyssey	Head! Foot! And The Pink Axe	CD	JNR 12
2006	Melk The G6-49	Mene Mene Tekel Parsin	CD	JNR 11
2006	LAFCADIO	Sham Duvet	CD	JNR 10
2006	Manners For Husbands	Sickly Love Sadness	MP3	JNR 09
2006	Abner Trio	Distant Thunder of the Sacred Force	CD	JNR 08
2005	Various Artists	Strata: A Young Person's Guide to Experimental Music	CD	JNR 07
2005	Gogglesphere / The Nancy School	Split	7"	JNR 06
2005	Receptor Sight	Cycles and Connections	CD	JNR 05
2004	Gogglesphere	Babies In Hell...	CD	JNR 04
2004	Melk the G6-49	Glossolalia	CD	JNR 03
2004	Manners For Husbands / Melk The G6-49	Split	7"	JNR 02
2003	Melk the G6-49	Self-Titled	CD	JNR 01

== See also ==
- List of record labels
