= Polyvinyl Record Co. discography =

Recording catalog

The following is a list of releases by Polyvinyl Record Co. Polyvinyl Record Co. was established in 1995 and has since put out more than 350 records.

== 1995 ==
- Back of Dave/Walker - Back of Dave/Walker (PRC-003)

== 1996 ==
- Braid - Rainsnowmatch (PRC-004)
- Various Artists - Direction (PRC-007)
- Braid - I'm Afraid of Everything (PRC-008)
- Rainer Maria - Rainer Maria (PRC-009)
- Days in December/Sweater Weather - Days in December/Sweater Weather (PRC-010)
- Ativin - Pills vs. Planes (PRC-011)

== 1997 ==
- Rainer Maria - New York, 1955 (PRC-013)
- Radio Flyer - In Their Strange White Armor (PRC-012)
- Kerosene 454 - Race (PRC-014)
- Braid/Corm - Braid/Corm (PRC-015)
- Braid - First Day Back (PRC-017)
- Rainer Maria - Past Worn Searching (PRC-016)

== 1998 ==
- Braid - Frame and Canvas (PRC-018)
- Paris, Texas - Paris, Texas (PRC-020)
- American Football - American Football EP (PRC-019)
- Calvin Krime - 3 x 3 for 3 1/2 (PRC-021)
- Sean Na Na - ...and His Baby Blue (PRC-023)
- Braid/Burning Airlines - Braid/Burning Airlines (PRC-022)

== 1999 ==
- Rainer Maria - Look Now Look Again (PRC-024)
- Braid - Please Drive Faster (PRC-026)
- American Football - American Football (PRC-025)
- Paris, Texas - So, You Think It's Hot Here? (PRC-027)
- Aloha - The Great Communicators, The Interpreters, The Nonbelievers (PRC-028)
- Rainer Maria - Atlantic (PRC-029)

== 2000 ==
- Braid - Movie Music Vol. One + Two (Box Set) (PRC-032)
- Braid - Movie Music Vol. 1 (PRC-030)
- Braid - Movie Music Vol. 2 (PRC-031)
- Aloha - That's Your Fire (PRC-033)
- Hey Mercedes - Hey Mercedes (PRC-035)
- Pele - The Nudes (PRC-034)
- Paris, Teas - Brazilliant! (PRC-036)
- Sunday's Best - Poised to Break (PRC-037)
- Rainer Maria - Hell and High Water (PRC-038)

== 2001 ==
- Rainer Maria - A Better Version of Me (PRC-039)
- AM/FM - Mutilate Us (PRC-041)
- Various Artists - ReDirection (PRC-040)
- The Ivory Coast - Clouds (PRC-042)
- Owen - Owen (PRC-043)
- AM/FM - Getting Into Sinking (PRC-044)
- matt pond PA - This Is Not the Green Fury (PRC-045)

== 2002 ==
- Mates of State - Our Constant Concern (PRC-046)
- matt pond PA - The Green Fury (PRC-048)
- Kaia Fischer - Open Ground (PRC-047)
- Friction - Discography 1991-1994 (PRC-049)
- Aloha - Sugar (PRC-045)
- Sunday's Best - The Californian (PRC-050)
- matt pond PA - The Nature of Maps (PRC-051)
- Pele - Enemies (PRC-053)
- AM/FM - The Sky Is the New Ground (PRC-052)
- Rainer Maria - Ears Ring (EP) (PRC-055)
- Owen - No Good For No One Now (PRC-054)

== 2003 ==
- Rainer Maria - Long Knives Drawn (PRC-056)
- The Red Hot Valentines - Calling Off Today (PRC-057)
- Mates of State/Dear Nora - Mates of States/Dear Nora (PRC-058)
- Saturday Looks Good To Me - All Your Summer Songs (PRC-059)
- Mates of State - My Solo Project (PRC-060)
- The Red Hot Valentines - Sumer Fling (PRC-061)
- Pele - Elephant (PRC-063)
- Mates of State - Team Boo (PRC-065)
- Decibully - City of Festivals (PRC-066)

== 2004 ==
- The M's - The M's (PRC-115)
- Volcano, I'm Still Excited!! - Volcano, I'm Still Excited!! (PRC-067)
- Rainer Maria - Anyone In Love With You (Already Knows) (PRC-068)
- of Montreal - Satanic Panic in the Attic (PRC-069)
- of Montreal - Coquelicot Asleep in the Poppies: A Variety of Whimsical Verse (PRC-071)
- Owen - (the ep) (PRC-070)
- Owen/The Rutabega - Owen/The Rutabega Split (PRC-072)
- Joan of Arc - Joan of Arc, Dick Cheney, Mark Twain (PRC-074)
- Volcano, I'm Still Excited!! - New Brad b/w 1st Gun (PRC-075)
- Saturday Looks Good To Me - Every Night (PRC-073)
- Collections of Colonies of Bees - Customer (PRC-077)
- Aloha - Here Comes Everyone (PRC-076)
- Mates of State - Two of Us (PRC-081)
- Mates of State - All Day (PRC-079)
- Owen - I Do Perceive (PRC-080)
- of Montreal - Aldhils Arboretum (PRC-078)

== 2005 ==
- Audible - Sky Signal (PRC-083)
- Ida - Heart Like a River (PRC-082)
- Pit er Pat/Icy Demons - Pit er Pat/Icy Demons (PRC-089)
- Decibully - Sing Out America! (PRC-084)
- ZZZZ - Palm Reader (PRC-086)
- of Montreal - The Sunlandic Twins (PRC-088)
- Picastro - Metal Cares (PRC-087)
- The Like Young - The Timid EP (PRC-3006)
- Owen/Joan of Arc/Make Believe/Love of Everything - The Association of Utopian Hologram Swallowers (PRC-090)
- 31Knots - The Curse of the Longest Day (PRC-093)
- Menomena - Posh Isolation b/w Tung Track (PRC-085)
- Hail Social - Hail Social (PRC-092)
- XBXRX - Sixth in Sixes (PRC-094)
- Make Believe - Shock of Being (PRC-091)
- Numbers - We're Animals (PRC-096)
- Minus the Bear/City on film - Minus the Bear/City on Film (PRC-097)
- 31Knots - Talk Like Blood (PRC-095)
- Corm - Audio Flame Kit (PRC-098)
- Headlights - The Enemies EP (PRC-099)

== 2006 ==
- of Montreal - Deflated Chime, Foals Slightly Flower Sibylline Responses (PRC-107)
- matt pond PA - Several Arrows Later (PRC-101)
- The M's - Future Women (PRC-100)
- of Montreal - The Early Four Track Recordings (PRC-109)
- Hail Social - Warning Sign (PRC-106)
- of Montreal - The Bird Who Continues to Eat the Rabbit's Flower (PRC-111)
- of Montreal - The Bedside Drama: A Petite Tragedy (PRC-110)
- Mates of State - Mates of State (PRC-105)
- Aloha - Some Echoes (PRC-104)
- The M's/Dr. Dog - The M's/Dr. Dog (PRC-108)
- Headlights/Most Serene Republic - Headlights/Most Serene Republic (PRC-114)
- The Like Young - Last Secrets (PRC-103)
- of Montreal - 7 Song Sampler Ep (PRC-113)
- Joan of Arc - The Intelligent Design of Joan of Arc (PRC-102)
- Various Artists - What To Do With Everything (PRC-121)
- The M's - Turn On, Tune In, Drop Out (PRC-116)
- Headlights - Kill Them with Kindness (Headlights album) (PRC-117)
- of Montreal - Satanic Twins (PRC-119)
- Cale Parks - Illuminated Manuscript (PRC-120)
- Make Believe - Of Course (PRC-125)
- Someone Still Loves You Boris Yeltsin - Broom (PRC-122)
- 31Knots - ep: Polemics (PRC-123)
- Owen - At Home With Owen (PRC-118)
- of Montreal - She's a Rejecter (CD Single) (PRC-131)
- of Montreal - She's a Rejecter (PRC-130)

== 2007 ==
- of Montreal - Heimdalsgate Like a Promethean Curse (PRC-132)
- of Montreal - Icons, Abstract Thee (PRC-128)
- of Montreal - Hissing Fauna, Are You the Destroyer? (PRC-124)
- 31Knots - The Day and Nights of Everything Anywhere (PRC-127)
- Headlights - Friends and Loves (PRC-133)
- XBXRX - Wars (PRC-129)
- Someone Still Loves You Boris Yeltsin - Not Worth Fighting (PRC-134)
- Architecture in Helsinki - Heart It Races Remixes 12" (PRC-136)
- Architecture in Helsinki - Heart It Races (PRC-135)
- of Montreal - Suffer for Fashion (PRC-141)
- Paris, Texas - Action Fans Help Us! (PRC-064)
- Saturday Looks Good To Me - Cold Colors (PRC-138)
- Joan of Arc - Many Times I've Mistaken (PRC-137)
- Architecture in Helsinki - Places Like This (PRC-139)
- Picastro - Whore Luck (PRC-140)
- matt pond PA - Last Light (PRC-143)
- of Montreal - Gender Mutiny (PRC-146)
- of Montreal - If He Is Protecting Our Nation, Then Who Will Protect Big Oil, Our Children? (PRC-144)
- Various Artists - Before You Go (PRC-150)
- Aloha - Light Works (PRC-147)

== 2008 ==
- Ida - Lovers Prayers (PRC-148)
- Headlights - Some Racing, Some Stopping (PRC-149)
- Someone Still Loves You Boris Yeltsin - Pershing (PRC-151)
- Joan of Arc - Boo! Human (PRC-152)
- The M's - Real Close Ones (PRC-153)
- Architecture in Helsinki - Like It or Not (PRC-157)
- Tu Fawning - Secession (PRC-156)
- Ida - My Fair, My Dark (PRC-158)
- 31Knots - Worried Well (PRC-155)
- Someone Still Loves You Boris Yeltsin/Puzzle - Someone Still Loves You Boris Yeltsin/Puzzle (PRC-159)
- of Montreal - Id Engager (PRC-161)
- of Montreal - Skeletal Lamping (PRC-160)
- Cale Parks - Sparklace (PRC-163)
- Ida - Tales of Brave Ida (PRC-164)
- Ida - I Know About You (PRC-165)
- Ida - Ten Small Paces (PRC-166)
- Asobi Seksu - Me & Mary (PRC-162)
- Joan of Arc - My Summer-Long High Wipeout (PRC-168)
- Headlights - Remixes (Headlights album) (PRC-169)

== 2009 ==
- Loney Dear - Dear John (PRC-171)
- The One Up Downstairs - The One Up Downstairs (PRC-112)
- of Montreal - An Eluardian Instance (PRC-172)
- Loney, Dear/Andrew Bird - Andrew Bird & Loney Dear (PRC-175)
- Asobi Seksu - Hush (PRC-170)
- Architecture in Helsinki - That Beep (PRC-174)
- Pele - A Scuttled Bender in a Watery Closet (PRC-167)
- Faux Hoax - Your Friends Will Carry You Home (PRC-177)
- Joan of Arc - Flowers (PRC-176)
- of Montreal - For Our Elegant Caste (PRC-178)
- Owen - The Seaside EP (PRC-179)
- Cale Parks - To Swift Mars (PRC-182)
- Japandroids - Post-Nothing (PRC-184)
- Asobi Seksu - Transparence (PRC-186)
- Owen - New Leaves (PRC-183)
- Headlights - Wildlife (PRC-187)
- James Husband - A Paralax I (PRC-185)
- Asobi Seksu - Rewolf (PRC-190)
- Loney Dear - Citadel Band (PRC-192)

== 2010 ==
- Various Artists - Joan of Arc Presents: Don't Mind Control (PRC-191)
- Aloha - Home Acres (PRC-189)
- Love Is All - Two Thousand and Ten Injuries (PRC-194)
- Braid - The Age of Octeen (PRC-181)
- Japandroids - Art Czars (PRC-195)
- Braid - Frankie Welfare Boy Age Five (PRC-180)
- Japandroids - No Singles (PRC-193)
- Casiokids - Topp stemning pa lokal bar (PRC-196)
- Japandroids - Younger Us (PRC-198)
- matt pond PA - The Dark Leaves (PRC-201)
- of Montreal - The Past Is A Grotesque Animal (PRC-203)
- Someone Still Loves You Boris Yeltsin - Let It Sway (PRC-197)
- of Montreal - False Priest (PRC-200)
- Owen - Abandoned Bridges (PRC-204)
- XBXRX - O (PRC-205)
- STRFKR - Julius (PRC-207)
- Joan of Arc - Meaningful Work (PRC-208)
- Sharon Van Etten - I'm Giving Up On You (PRC-206)
- Japandroids - Heavenward Grand Prix (PRC-199)
- Deerhoof/Physical Forms - Hoofdriver (PRC-9098)

== 2011 ==
- Deerhoof - Deerhoof vs. Evil (PRC-209)
- Asobi Seksu - Fluorescence (PRC-210)
- STRFKR - Reptilians (PRC-211)
- Vivian Girls - Share the Joy (PRC-214)
- Vivian Girls - I Heard You Say (PRC-220)
- Deerhoof - Friend Opportunity (PRC-217)
- Owen - O, Evelyn (PRC-213)
- Busdriver - ATM (PRC-219)
- Deerhoof/Xiu Xiu - Almost Xiu Xiu, Almost Deerhoof (PRC-9108)
- David Barnes - What's Weird (PRC-9113)
- of Montreal - thecontrollersphere (PRC-202)
- Joan of Arc - Life Like (PRC-215)
- 31Knots - Trump Harm (PRC-218)
- Vin Blanc - Chroma Key (PRC-221)
- Deerhoof - Milk Man (PRC-222)
- Deerhoof/WOOM - WOOM on Hoof - (PRC-9115)
- Love of Everything - Sooner I Wish - (PRC-9119)
- Braid - Closer to Closed (PRC-223)
- Shugo Tokumaru - Port Entropy (PRC-212)
- Xiu Xiu - Daphny (PRC-225)
- matt pond PA/Rocky Votolato - Rocky Votolato / matt pond PA (PRC-226)
- Various Artists - Japan 3.11.11: A Benefit Album - (PRC-9121)
- Loney Dear - Hall Music (PRC-227)
- Deerhoof/The Raccoonists - Behold a Raccoon in the Darkness - (PRC-9122)
- STRFKR/Champagne Champagne - STRFKR/Champagne Champagne (PRC-231)
- Casiokids - Aabenbaringen over aaskammen (PRC-229)
- Someone Still Loves You Boris Yeltsin - Tape Club (PRC-228)
- matt pond PA - Emblems (PRC-232)
- Owen - Ghost Town (PRC-224)
- Norse Horse - Grids - (PRC-9133)
- Various Artists - A Brief History in Moving Pictures (PRC-216)
- Rainer Maria - Rainer Maria (PRC-230)

== 2012 ==
- Deerhoof - Reveille (album) (PRC-235)
- Deerhoof/David Bazan - DeerBazan (PRC-9132)
- of Montreal - Paralytic Stalks (PRC-233)
- Xiu Xiu - Always (PRC-236)
- Mates of State - Crushes (The Covers Mixtape) (PRC-9140)
- matt pond PA - Measure (PRC-237)
- STRFKR - Heaven's Youth (Reptilians Demos) (PRC-9134)
- Deerhoof/of Montreal - Sygian x) Bisection (PRC-9138)
- Xiu Xiu/Dirty Beaches - Xiu Xiu / Dirty Beaches Split (PRC-9136)
- Japandroids - The House That Heaven Built (PRC-239)
- Birthmark - Antibodies (PRC-234)
- Japandroids - Celebration Rock (PRC-238)
- Sonny & The Sunsets - Longtime Companion (PRC-240)
- Dusted- Total Dust (PRC-243)
- Sexton Blake - Plays the Hits (PRC-241)
- Stagnant Pools - Temporary Room (PRC-242)
- Deerhoof - Breakup Song (PRC-244)
- Xiu Xiu - The Air Force (PRC-245)
- Harouki Zombi - Objet Petit A (PRC-249)
- of Montreal - Daughter of Cloud (PRC-246)
- Saturday Looks Good To Me - Sunglasses (PRC-247)
- Asobi Seksu/Boris - Asobi Seksu x Boris Split (PRC-SH-001)

== 2013 ==
- Shugo Tokumaru - In Focus? (PRC-250)
- Sonny & The Sunsets - 100 Records Vol. 1 (PRC-251)
- Sonny & The Sunsets - 100 Records Vol. 2 (PRC-252)
- Sonny & The Sunsets - 100 Records Vol. 3 (PRC-253)
- STRFKR - Miracle Mile (PRC-247)
- Wampire - The Hearse (PRC-257)
- Psychic Twin - Strangers (PRC-259)
- Generationals - Heza (PRC-255)
- Painted Palms - Carousel (PRC-258)
- Sonny & The Sunsets - Tomorrow Is Alright (PRC-9158)
- Sonny & The Sunsets - Imagine (PRC-262)
- Their / They're / There - Their / They're / There (PRC-261)
- Wampire - Curiosity (PRC-254)
- Saturday Looks Good To Me - One Kiss Ends It All (PRC-256)
- Sonny & The Sunsets - Antenna to the Afterworld (PRC-260)
- Owen - L'Ami du Peuple (PRC-264)
- Joan of Arc - Testimonium Songs (PRC-263)
- The Dodos - Carrier (PRC-265)
- Pillar Point - Diamond Mine (PRC-269)
- Someone Still Loves You Boris Yeltsin - Fly By Wire (PRC-266)
- of Montreal - Lousy with Sylvianbriar (PRC-268)
- STRFKR - Golden Light (PRC-9171)
- Various Artists - I Need You Bad (PRC-267)
- Their / They're / There - Analog Weekend (PRC-270)

== 2014 ==
- Painted Palms - Forever (PRC-271)
- Xiu Xiu - Angel Guts: Red Classroom (PRC-274)
- Pillar Point - Pillar Point (PRC-273)
- Owls - Two (PRC-272)
- The Dodos - Yours Truly Session (PRC-279)
- of Montreal - Satanic Panic in the Attic (10-Year Anniversary Edition) (PRC-9190)
- of Montreal - Jigsaw Puzzle (PRC-275)
- Xiu Xiu - Unclouded Sky (PRC-277)
- American Football - American Football (Deluxe Edition) (PRC-276)
- Stagnant Pools - Geist (PRC-280)
- White Reaper - White Reaper (PRC-281)
- Alvvays - Alvvays (PRC-282)
- The Rentals - Lost in Alphaville (PRC-278)
- Generationals - Alix (PRC-283)
- Wampire - Bazaar (PRC-285)
- Deerhoof - La Isla Bonita (PRC-286)
- Sonny & The Sunsets - The Freakishly Bizarre Yet Terribly True Tales of Sonny & The Sunsets (PRC-289)
- Owen - Other People's Songs (PRC-287)

== 2015 ==
- The Dodos - Individ (PRC-284)
- Sonny & The Sunsets - Talent Night at the Ashram (PRC-288)
- of Montreal - Chinese Rocks b/w Either Way I Lose (PRC-9230)
- of Montreal - Aureate Gloom (PRC-290)
- Fred Thomas - All Are Saved (PRC-296)
- Jacco Gardner - Find Yourself (PRC-297)
- Polyvinyl - Polyvinyl 4-Track Singles Series Vol. 1 (PRC-9226)
- Shugo Tokumaru - L.S.T. (PRC-9196)
- Xiu Xiu - Fabulous Muscles (PRC-291)
- Shugo Tokumaru - Night Piece (PRC-9195)
- of Montreal - Snare Lustrous Doomings (PRC-294)
- Jacco Gardner - Hypnophobia (PRC-298)
- Someone Still Loves You Boris Yeltsin - The High Country (PRC-295)
- White Reaper - White Reaper Does It Again (PRC-299)
- Owen/Into It. Over It. - Split EP (PRC-301)
- Painted Palms - Horizons (PRC-300)
- Braid - Braid 6 Cassettes Box Set (PRC-303)
- Birthmark - How You Look When You're Falling Down (PRC-302)
- Beach Slang - HERE, I MADE THIS FOR YOU (Beach Slang Mixtape Vol. I) (PRC-9146)
- Beach Slang - The Things We Do to Find People Who Feel Like Us (PRC-305)
- Deerhoof - Fever 121614 (PRC-309)

== 2016 ==
- Pillar Point - Marble Mouth (PRC-304)
- Radiation City - Synesthetica (PRC-308)
- La Sera - Music For Listening To Music To (PRC-306)
- Tancred - Bed Case b/w Hounds (PRC-9258)
- Tancred - Out of the Garden (PRC-311)
- Ida - Will You Find Me (PRC-293)
- Deerhoof - Offend Maggie (PRC-292)
- Aloha - Little Windows Cut Right Through (PRC-310)
- Sonny & The Sunsets - Moods Baby Moods (PRC-313)
- Ladyhawke - Wild Things (album) (PRC-318)
- Deerhoof - The Magic (PRC-315)
- Owen - The King of Whys (PRC-316)
- of Montreal - Innocence Reaches (PRC-317)
- Xiu Xiu - Plays the Music of Twin Peaks (PRC-312)
- Katy Goodman & Greta Morgan - Take It, It's Yours (PRC-314)
- Psychic Twin - Strange Diary (PRC-307)
- Beach Slang - A Loud Bash of Teenage Feelings (PRC-319)
- La Sera - Queens (PRC-328)
- Julia Jacklin - Don't Let The Kids Win (PRC-322)
- American Football - American Football(LP2) (PRC-320)
- STRFKR - Being No One, Going Nowhere (PRC-321)
- Jay Som - Turn Into (PRC-326)
- Various Artists - Polyvinyl Plays Polyvinyl (PRC-325)

== 2017 ==
- Fred Thomas - Changer (PRC-324)
- STRFKR - Vault Vol 1 (PRC-9317)
- Beach Slang - HERE, I MADE THIS FOR YOU (Beach Slang Mixtape Vol. 2) (PRC-9283)
- Xiu Xiu - Forget (PRC-327)
- Jay Som - Everybody Works (PRC-329)
- White Reaper - The World's Best American Band (PRC-323)
- of Montreal - Rune Husk EP (PRC-335)
- Shugo Tokumaru - TOSS (PRC-331)
- Hazel English - Just Give In / Never Going Home (PRC-338)
- Pet Symmetry - Vision (PRC-332)
- Palehound - A Place I'll Always Go (PRC-333)
- STRFKR - Vault Vol. 2 (PRC-9318)
- Rainer Maria - S/T (PRC-336)
- Alvvays - Antisocialites (PRC-334)
- Julia Jacklin - Eastwick b/w Cold Caller (PRC-339)
- Mister Heavenly - Boxing the Moonlight (PRC-337)
- Quiet Slang - We Were Babies & We Were Dirtbags (PRC-341)
- Diane Coffee - Peel (PRC-340)
- FAN - Fire b/w Disappear (PRC-342)
- STRFKR - Vault Vol. 3 (PRC-9319)
- Xiu Xiu/(r) - Xiu Xiu/(r) (PRC-345)

== 2018 ==
- Jeff Rosenstock - POST- (PRC-353)
- Jay Som - Pirouette (PRC-347)
- Anna Burch - Quit the Curse (PRC-346)
- of Montreal - White is Relic/Irrealis Mood (PRC-350)
- Dusted - Blackout Summer (PRC-352)
- Post Animal - When I Think Of You In A Castle (PRC-351)
- FAN - Barton's Den (PRC-348)
- Quiet Slang - Everything Matters But No One Is Listening (PRC-349)
- Tancred - Nightstand (PRC-344)
- Alvvays - N.A. Tour 7" (PRC-358)
- The Get Up Kids - Kicker (PRC-359)
- Collections of Colonies of Bees - HAWAII (PRC-360)
- Phantastic Ferniture - Phantastic Ferniture (PRC-363)
- Shy Boys - Bell House (PRC-362)
- STRFKR - Being No One, Going Nowhere (Remixes) (PRC-357)
- Fred Thomas - Aftering (PRC-365)
- Justus Proffit & Jay Som - Nothing's Changed (PRC-366)
- Kero Kero Bonito - Time 'n' Place (PRC-377)
- The Dodos - Certainty Waves (PRC-367)
- The Dodos - Beware of the Maniacs (PRC-364)
- Antarctigo Vespucci - Love in the Time of E-Mail (PRC-369)
- Grapetooth - Grapetooth (PRC-368)
- Rainer Maria - Catastrophe Keeps Us Together (PRC-361)
- Jacco Gardner - Somnium (PRC-343)
- Generationals - State Dogs: Singles 2017-18 (PRC-371)

== 2019 ==
- Kero Kero Bonito - Flamingo (PRC-379)
- Kero Kero Bonito - TOTEP (PRC-376)
- Kero Kero Bonito - Bonito Generation (PRC-375)
- Pedro The Lion - Phoenix (PRC-370)
- Xiu Xiu - Girl with Basket of Fruit (PRC-373)
- Julia Jacklin - Crushing (PRC-378)
- Fred Thomas/Anna Burch - Fred Thomas/Anna Burch Split (PRC-372)
- American Football - American Football LP3 (PRC-374)
- Diane Coffee - Internet Arms (PRC-384)
- The Get Up Kids - Problems (PRC-381)
- Kero Kero Bonito - Swimming/The Open Road (PRC-388)
- Palehound - Black Friday (PRC-386)
- Generationals - Con Law (PRC-354)
- Generationals - Reader As Detective (PRC-354)
- Jay Som - Anak Ko (PRC-390)
- Vivian Girls - Memory (PRC-383)
- Vivian Girls - Vivian Girls (PRC-383)
- Vivian Girls - Everything Goes Wrong (PRC-392)
- Generationals - Trust/Lucky Numbers (PRC-356)
- Generationals - Actor-Caster (PRC-355)
- Chris Farren - Born Hot (PRC-389)
- Jeff Rosenstock & Laura Stevenson - Still Young (PRC-401)
- Anamanaguchi - [USA] (PRC-307)
- Deerhoof - The_Man,_the_King,_the_Girl (PRC-393)
- STRFKR - Live From Brooklyn Steel (PRC-385)
- American Football - Year One Demos (PRC-400)

== 2020 ==
- of Montreal - UR FUN (PRC-394)
- Squirrel Flower - I Was Born Swimming (PRC-395)
- Post Animal - Forward Motion Godyssey (PRC-396)
- Yumi Zouma - Truth or Consequences (PRC-402)
- Anna Burch - If You're Dreaming (PRC-398)
- STRFKR - Future Past Life (PRC-408)
- Hazel English - Wake UP! (PRC-399)
- Jay Som - A Thousand Words (PRC-404)
- Jeff Rosenstock - NO DREAM (PRC-420)
- Volcano, I'm Still Excited!! - Carbon Copy (PRC-403)
- Owen - The Avalanche (PRC-403)
- Various Artists - Exquisite Corpse (PRC-419)
- Anamanaguchi - Power Supply (PRC-415)
- Anamanaguchi - Dawn Metropolis (PRC-412)
- Shy Boys - Talk Loud (PRC-409)
- Laura Jane Grace - Stay Alive (PRC-418)
- Oceanator - Things I Never Said (PRC-425)
- Anamanaguchi - Endless Fantasy (PRC-406)
- Yumi Zouma - Truth or Consequences - Alternate Versions (PRC-417)
- STRFKR - Ambient 1 (PRC-416)

== 2021 ==
- IAN SWEET - Show Me How You Disappear (PRC-428)
- Xiu Xiu - OH NO (PRC-426)
- MAN ON MAN - MAN ON MAN (PRC-432)

== 2022 ==
- Pedro The Lion - Havasu (PRC-431)
- Squirrel Flower - Planet EP
- Chris Farren - Death Don't Wait (PRC-454)
- Yumi Zouma - Present Tense (PRC-446)
- Oceanator - Nothing's Ever Fine (PRC-455)
- Diane Coffee - With People (PRC-445)
- Plato III - The Devil Has Texas (PRC-458)
- Momma - Household Name (PRC-457)
- IAN SWEET - STAR STUFF
- Anamanaguchi - Miku (PRC-439-1)
- of Montreal - Freewave Lucifer f<ck, f^ck, f>ck (PRC-462)
- Julia Jacklin - PRE PLEASURE (PRC-464)
- Alvvays - Blue Rev (PRC-465)
- Their / They're / There - Their / They're / There (PRC-261)
- Jeff Rosenstock & Laura Stevenson- Younger Still

== 2023 ==
- Xiu Xiu - Ignore Grief (PRC-469)
- Jeff Rosenstock - HELLMODE (PRC-475)

== Mail Order Only Releases ==
- Saturday Looks Good To Me - Diary (PRC-ME-001)
- Aloha - Boys in the Bathtub (PRC-ME-002)
- Pele/toe - Pele/toe Split (PRC-ME-003)
- Headlights - The Enemies EP (PRC-ME-004)
- ZZZZ/Uz Jsme Doma - ZZZZ/Uz Jsme Doma (PRC-ME-005)

== Picture Disc Editions ==
- of Montreal - The Sunlandic Twins - (PRC-PDE-001)
- STRFKR - Reptilians - (PRC-PDE-002)
- Someone Still Loves You Boris Yeltsin - Broom - (PRC-PDE-003)
- Architecture in Helsinki - Places Like This - (PRC-PDE-004)
- Owen - At Home With Owen - (PRC-PDE-005)
- of Montreal - Hissing Fauna, Are You the Destroyer? - (PRC-PDE-006)
- Deerhoof - Deerhoof vs. Evil - (PRC-PDE-007)
- Braid - Frame and Canvas - (PRC-PDE-008)
- American Football - American Football - (PRC-PDE-009)
