= List of Polyvinyl Record Co. artists =

This is an overview of artists linked to Polyvinyl Record Co.

- 31Knots
- Aloha
- Alvvays
- American Football
- AM/FM
- Anamanaguchi
- Antarctigo Vespucci
- Architecture in Helsinki
- Asobi Seksu
- Ativin
- Audible
- Beach Slang
- Birthmark
- Braid
- Anna Burch
- Casiokids
- Collections of Colonies of Bees
- Corm
- Decibully
- Deerhoof
- The Dodos
- Dusted
- FAN
- Faux Hoax
- Friction
- Generationals
- The Get Up Kids
- Grapetooth
- Hail Social
- Hazel English
- Headlights
- Ida
- The Ivory Coast
- Jacco Gardner
- Julia Jacklin
- Jay Som
- Japandroids
- James Husband
- Jeff Rosenstock
- Joan of Arc
- Kaia Fischer
- Katy Goodman & Greta Morgan
- Kero Kero Bonito
- Kerosene 454
- La Sera
- Ladyhawke
- The Like Young
- Loney Dear
- Love Is All
- The M's
- Mates of State
- Matt Pond PA
- Mister Heavenly
- of Montreal
- The One Up Downstairs
- Owen
- Owls
- Painted Palms
- Paris, Texas
- Cale Parks
- Palehound
- Pedro the Lion
- Pet Symmetry
- Pele
- Phantastic Ferniture
- Picastro
- Pillar Point
- Post Animal
- Psychic Twin
- Quiet Slang
- Radiation City
- Radio Flyer
- Rainer Maria
- The Red Hot Valentines
- The Rentals
- Jeff Rosenstock
- Saturday Looks Good To Me
- Shy Boys
- Someone Still Loves You Boris Yeltsin
- Sonny & The Sunsets
- Stagnant Pools
- STRFKR
- Sunday's Best
- Tancred
- Their/They're/There
- Fred Thomas
- Shugo Tokumaru
- Tu Fawning
- Vivian Girls
- Volcano, I'm Still Excited!!
- Wampire
- White Reaper
- xbxrx
- Xiu Xiu
- ZZZZ
