= Pitchfork Music Festival 2019 =

Music festival

- Dates: July 19–21, 2019
- Locations: Union Park, Chicago, United States
- Website: pitchforkmusicfestival.com

The Pitchfork Music Festival 2019 was held on July 19 to 21, 2019 at the Union Park, Chicago, United States. The festival was headlined by Haim, the Isley Brothers and Robyn.

== Lineup ==
Headline performers are listed in boldface. Artists listed from latest to earliest set times.

Green
Friday, July 19	Saturday, July 20	Sunday, July 21
**Haim**; Pusha T Sky Ferreira; Standing on the Corner; Great Black Music Ensemble	**The Isley Brothers**; Stereolab; Parquet Courts; CHAI; Lala Lala	**Robyn**; Whitney; Clairo black midi Dreezy

Red
Friday, July 19	Saturday, July 20	Sunday, July 21
Mavis Staples; Earl Sweatshirt; Valee; MIKE	Belle and Sebastian; Kurt Vile; Cate Le Bon; Ric Wilson	Charli XCX; Khruangbin; JPEGMAFIA; Flasher

Blue
Friday, July 19	Saturday, July 20	Sunday, July 21
Low; Soccer Mommy; Julia Holter; Grapetooth; Rico Nasty	Jeremih; Freddie Gibbs; Amber Mark; Jay Som; Bitchin Bajas (Note: Tirzah was supposed to perform at the festival but cancelled due to visa issues. She was replaced by Bitchin Bajas.)	Snail Mail; Neneh Cherry; Amen Dunes; Ibeyi; Tasha
