= Some Echoes =

Studio album by Aloha
- Released: April 11, 2006
- Recorded: At Silver Sonya in Arlington, VA and Tony Cavallario's house in Rochester, NY
- Genre: Indie rock
- Length: 39:02
- Label: Polyvinyl Record Co.

Aloha chronology
Here Comes Everyone (2004)	Some Echoes (2006)	Light Works (2007)

Professional ratings
Review scores
Source	Rating
AllMusic	3/5 stars
Entertainment Weekly	B+
Pitchfork	8.0/10

Some Echoes is the fourth full-length album by Ohio band Aloha. It was released on April 11, 2006, by Polyvinyl Record Co.

It received mostly favorable reviews, with a score of 78/100 on Metacritic.

== Track listing ==
1. "Brace Your Face" – 6:27
2. "Big Morning" – 1:52
3. "Your Eyes" – 4:19
4. "Ice Storming" – 4:22
5. "Between the Walls" – 2:44
6. "Come Home" – 5:59
7. "Weekend" – 3:15
8. "Summer Lawn" – 3:01
9. "If I Lie Down" – 3:42
10. "Mountain" – 3:18

== Personnel ==
=== Performers ===
- Cale Parks
- Matthew Gengler
- T.J. Lipple
- Tony Cavallario

=== Other ===
- Mixed by T.J. Lipple
- Mastered by Chad Clark
- Art by Melina Ausikaitis
- Design by Ben Yonda
