= Sucker (Ian Sweet album) =

Studio album by Ian Sweet
- Released: November 3, 2023
- Studios: Outliner Inn, New York, US
- Genres: Bedroom pop, indie folk
- Length: 41:47
- Label: Polyvinyl
- Producers: Alex Craig; Isaac Eiger; Jilian Medford

Ian Sweet chronology
Show Me How You Disappear (2021)	Sucker (2023)

Singles from Sucker
- 1. "You Spit" Released: August 11, 2023; 2. "Emergency Contact" Released: September 14, 2023

Sucker is the fourth studio album by American indie rock musician Jilian Medford, recording as Ian Sweet, released on November 3, 2023, through Polyvinyl Record Co. It was produced by Medford, Alex Craig, and Isaac Eiger. It received positive reviews from critics.

== Background and recording ==
Medford recorded the album at the Outlier Inn, an artists' residency in the Catskill Mountains of New York with co-producers Alex Craig and Isaac Eiger. The three had full access to the studio, which allowed them "space for experimentation and spontaneity".

On August 11, 2023, Medford announced the release of Ian Sweet's fourth studio album, along with the first single "Your Spit". The single was produced by Alex Craig and Strange Ranger vocalist Isaac Eiger, while the music video was directed by Brittany Reeber, and featured Sarah Sherman and Martin Herlihy.

The second single "Emergency Contact" was released on September 14, 2023, with a music video directed by Brittany Reeber, and features Please Don't Destroy member Martin Herlihy.

== Critical reception ==
Professional ratings
Aggregate scores
Source	Rating
Metacritic	79/100
Review scores
Source	Rating
Paste	7.9/10
Pitchfork	7.3/10
Under the Radar	8.5/10 stars

Sucker received a score 79 out of 100 on review aggregator Metacritic based on four critics' reviews, indicating "generally favorable" reception. Marissa Lorusso of Pitchfork wrote that Medford "dials down the pressure, turning her attention to more mundane crises" and "retaining her commitment to emotional transparency, she leans into high-adrenaline hooks and poignant self-reflection with confidence and grit". Ethan Beck of Paste felt that the album "succeeds with temperamental synths, guitars that add a dreamy gloss and percussion that splits the difference between bedroom-pop programming and indie folk mutedness". Reviewing the album for Under the Radar, Michael James Hall called it "an adventurous pop album" as well as "a post-COVID, post-breakup record blooming with hope and self-realization". Glide Magazine' Shawn Donohue described it as "the most pop-centric album of Ian Sweet's career" that was not unexpected as "with each passing record Medford has shifted towards more mainstream sounds. Fully embracing the break-up/hook-up dance-ready pattern (with slight distortion around the edges) Medford's efforts are ready to be sung out over large speaker stacks instead of smaller indie rock clubs".

== Track listing ==
All tracks are written by Jilian Medford and Alex Craig.

Sucker track listing
No.	Title	Length
1.	"Bloody Knees"	4:40
2.	"Smoking Again"	4:16
3.	"Emergency Contact"	5:02
4.	"Sucker"	4:28
5.	"Comeback"	3:47
6.	"Your Spit"	3:25
7.	"Clean"	3:54
8.	"Fight"	3:32
9.	"Slowdance"	3:37
10.	"Hard"	5:06
Total length:		41:47

== Personnel ==
- Jilian Medford – vocals, guitar, synthesizer, production
- Alex Craig – guitar, synthesizer, production
- Isaac Eiger – guitar, synthesizer, production (tracks 4, 10); piano (10)
