= Nightstand (album) =

Studio album by Tancred
- Released: June 1, 2018
- Length: 34:42
- Label: Polyvinyl

Tancred chronology
Out of the Garden (2016)	Nightstand (2018)

Nightstand is the fourth studio album by American musician Tancred. It was released in June 2018 under Polyvinyl Record Co.

Professional ratings
Aggregate scores
Source	Rating
Metacritic	64/100
Review scores
Source	Rating
DIY Mag	4/5 stars
AllMusic	3/5 stars

== Track listing ==
No.	Title	Length
1.	"Song One"	1:43
2.	"Queen of New York"	2:59
3.	"Apple Tree Girl"	2:44
4.	"Hot Star"	2:54
5.	"Clipping"	3:57
6.	"Something Else"	3:27
7.	"Underwear"	3:23
8.	"Just You"	3:18
9.	"Strawberry Selfish"	3:35
10.	"Reviews"	3:09
11.	"Rowing"	3:33
