= On a Carousel of Sound, We Go Round =

2010 American documentary film by Nicholas Kleczewski

On a Carousel of Sound, We Go Round is a 2010 documentary film by Nicholas Kleczewski chronicling the band The Snake the Cross the Crown.

== Cast ==
- Mark Fate
- Nate Higley
- Kevin Jones
- Franklin Sammons
- William Sammons

== Awards ==
The documentary won an award of merit at the Accolade Global Film Competition. It also won best picture, best performance, and best editing at the 2009 Maverick Movie Awards
