= The Californian (Sunday's Best album) =

Studio album by Sunday's Best
- Released: May 14, 2002
- Genre: Indie rock
- Length: 46:37
- Label: Polyvinyl Record Co.
- Producers: Tony Lash, Sunday's Best

Sunday's Best chronology
| Poised to Break (2000) | The Californian (2002) |

The Californian is the second and final studio album by Californian indie rock band Sunday's Best.

Professional ratings
Review scores
| Source | Rating |
|---|---|
| AllMusic | 4.5/5 stars |

== Reception ==
The album is more pop and less emo than Sunday's Best's debut album Poised to Break. The album was viewed as a step forward for Sunday's Best.

== Track listing ==
1. "The Try" – 4:45
2. "The Californian" – 4:17
3. "Don't Let It Fade" – 4:12
4. "The Salt Mines Of Santa Monica" – 3:41
5. "If We Had It Made" – 5:42
6. "Our Left Coast Ambitions" – 4:03
7. "Without Meaning" – 5:16
8. "Beethoven St." – 4:39
9. "Brave, But Brittle..." – 4:03
10. "Los Feliz Arms" – 5:59
