= Sugar (Aloha album) =

Studio album by Aloha
- Released: May 14, 2002
- Genre: Indie rock; experimental pop
- Length: 44:01
- Label: Polyvinyl

Sugar is the third full-length album by Aloha. It was released in 2002 on Polyvinyl Records.

== Track listing ==
1. "Fractures, Pt. 1" – 2:27
2. "They See Rocks" – 4:20
3. "Let Your Head Hang Low" – 4:44
4. "Balling Phase" – 6:26
5. "It Won't Be Long" – 3:04
6. "Protest Song" – 3:22
7. "Thieves All Around Us" – 5:01
8. "Dissolving" – 5:06
9. "I Wish No Chains Upon You" – 4:26
10. "We Get Down" – 6:05

== Reception ==
Professional ratings
Review scores
Source	Rating
AllMusic	3/5 stars
Pitchfork	8/10 stars

New Music said of their album, "In the wake of That's Your Fire. Aloha's breathtaking and complex collection of jazz-based, vibraphone-enhanced lullabies, the band's sophomore release hits like a hurricane." They praised its "pretty melodies".
