= "Looked Up" Plus Four =

EP by The Like Young
- Released: 2002
- Genre: Indie rock, power pop
- Label: Kittridge
- Producer: Joe Ziemba

The Like Young chronology
S. T. Monroe/The Like Young (2002)	"Looked Up" Plus Four (2002)	Art Contest (2003)

"Looked Up" Plus Four is an EP by indie rock band The Like Young, composed of Amanda and Joseph Ziemba, formerly of Wolfie and Busytoby. It was released in 2002 by Kittridge Records.

== Critical reception ==
The album was positively reviewed as being catchy and well-written, and was generally seen as a good introduction to the music of The Like Young.

A review by Cam Lindsay in Exclaim! called the tracks "catchy, ear-friendly power pop" with "monstrous riffs". Dave Heaton of PopMatters described the album as a "quick ride but a fantastic one." He noted that fans of the Ziembas' previous endeavours would find the sound familiar but "in somewhat different musical clothes". Angelo de Ieso II of In Music We Trust found the album "raw and uninhibited", although he was critical of some of the lyrics as "tangential".

== Track listing ==
All tracks are written by The Like Young

No.	Title	Length
1.	"Looked Up"	2:20
2.	"Bad Excuse"	1:54
3.	"Freddy"	1:23
4.	"Threshold Person"	2:27
5.	"You Can't Get It Back"	2:23

== Personnel ==
- Amanda Ziemba – Drums, Vocals, Group Member
- Joseph A. Ziemba – Bass, Guitar, Vocals, Group Member
