= So Serious =

Studio album by The Like Young
- Released: 2004
- Genre: indie rock
- Length: 24:11
- Label: Parasol Records
- Producer: Joe Ziemba

The Like Young chronology
Art Contest (2003)	So Serious (2004)	The Timid EP (2005)

Professional ratings
Review scores
Source	Rating
Allmusic	4/5 stars

So Serious is the second album by indie rock band The Like Young. It was released on Parasol Records in 2004.

== Track listing ==
1. "Out to Get You" – 1:14
2. "You're No Cheat" – 2:04
3. "Tighten My Tie" – 2:18
4. "Worry a Lot" – 2:31
5. "Sabine & Me" – 1:22
6. "Routines" – 2:21
7. "Degenerate" – 1:32
8. "Heard Your Health" – 2:45
9. "Don't Know When to Stop" – 2:30
10. "Sharp or Messy" – 1:57
11. "Be a Sinner" – 1:30
12. "Really Up to You" – 2:07
