= Bazaar (album) =

Studio album by Wampire
- Released: October 7, 2014
- Studio: The Museum in Greenpoint, Brooklyn
- Genre: Psychedelic pop, indie pop
- Length: 32:12
- Label: Polyvinyl
- Producer: Jacob Portrait

Wampire chronology
| Curiosity (2013) | Bazaar (2014) |

Professional ratings
Aggregate scores
| Source | Rating |
|---|---|
| Metacritic | 67/100 |
Review scores
| Source | Rating |
| AllMusic | 3.5/5 stars |
| Consequence of Sound | C− |
| NME | 7/10 |
| The Skinny | 3/5 stars |
| Under the Radar | 7/10 stars |

Bazaar is the second studio album by the American indie rock band Wampire. It was released on October 7, 2014, through Polyvinyl. It was produced by Unknown Mortal Orchestra member Jacob Portrait.

== Track listing ==
| No. | Title | Length |
|---|---|---|
| 1. | "The Amazing Heart Attack" | 3:31 |
| 2. | "Bad Attitude" | 3:05 |
| 3. | "Fly on the Wall" | 4:00 |
| 4. | "Wizard Staff" | 3:52 |
| 5. | "Too Stoned" | 3:32 |
| 6. | "Millennials" | 4:47 |
| 7. | "Sticking Out" | 3:06 |
| 8. | "Life of Luxury" | 2:53 |
| 9. | "People of Earth" | 3:26 |
