= Kia LaBeija =

American artist

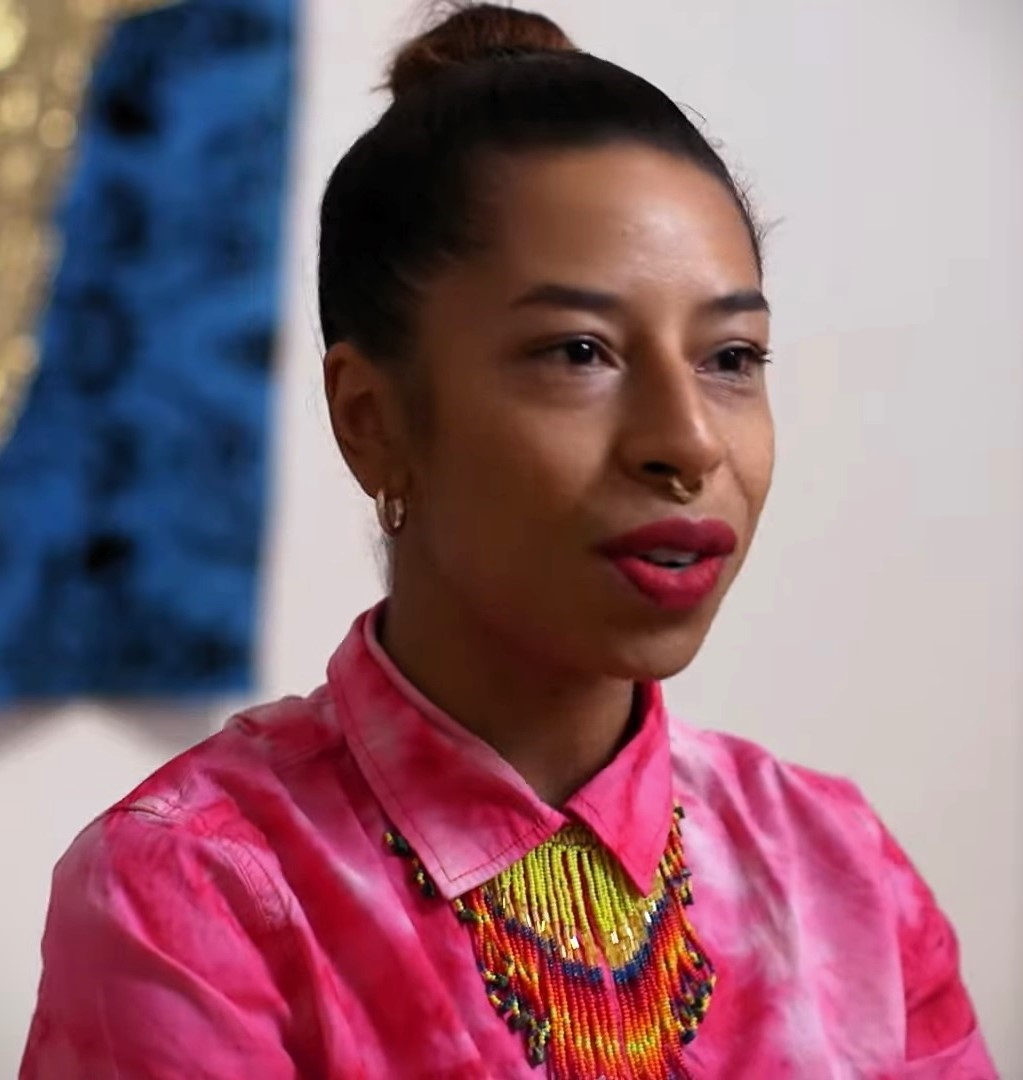
- LaBeija in 2013
- Born: Kia Michelle Benbow; March 18, 1990 (age 36); Hell's Kitchen, New York
- Education: The New School
- Website: https://kialabeija.com

Kia Michelle Benbow (professionally known as Kia LaBeija or Kia; b. March 18, 1990) is an American fine artist. Her most well known series, 24, is a sociopolitical commentary on the effects of growing up as a young woman of color with HIV. She is a former Mother of the House of LaBeija.

== Biography ==
Kia LaBeija was born and raised in Hell's Kitchen, New York. Her mother, Kwan Bennett, was born in Subic Bay, Philippines and is Filipino American. Her father, drummer Warren Benbow, was born and raised in Brooklyn, New York and is African American. She has one brother, actor, producer, and artist Kenn Michael. She grew up in Manhattan Plaza and was in the dance program at Alvin Ailey.

In 1993, LaBeija was diagnosed with HIV at the age of three, having contracted the virus through perinatal (mother-to-child) transmission. Her mother, Kwan, died of AIDS-related illness when LaBeija was 14.

LaBeija studied the arts at Eugene Lang College of Liberal Arts at The New School in Manhattan. At the age of 19, while at The New School, she became involved in the house and ballroom scene.

== Fine art ==
Kia LaBeija's work primarily is photography and dance. Her series 24 investigates her relationship to growing up with HIV as a woman of color in New York City. Her works have been included in group exhibitions, performances, and screenings at dozens of museums around the world including The Whitney Museum of American Art, The Tate Modern, The Brooklyn Museum, The Studio Museum in Harlem, The Museum of The City of New York, The Bronx Museum of the Arts, Los Angeles County Museum of Art, The International Center for Photography and The Leslie-Lohman Museum of Art.

LaBeija's work was featured as part of Art AIDS America, a touring group exhibition looking at 30 years of art making around HIV and AIDS. The show gained controversial press as there were only 5 black artists out of the 107 featured, with LaBeija being the only black woman. In January 2018, she was featured on the cover of Artforum. She achieved this without gallery representation, major art collectors, or a solo show. She is the 4th black woman to make the cover. She is a recipient of a 2019 Creative Capital Award with her partner Taina Larot, and was commissioned by Performa for its 2019 Performa Biennial.

== Ballroom and voguing ==
LaBeija came in the house and ballroom scene at the age of 19 in 2009 through a co-worker at Webster Hall. She began walking balls officially in 2012 and walked as a LaBeija for the first time at the last Latex Ball at Roseland Ballroom. She received the Hector Xtravaganza Xellence Award, named after her late gay father Hector Xtravaganza. In 2015, she was awarded the first Woman's Old Way Vogue of the Year. In 2016, she starred in band Pillar Point's music video "Dove".

LaBeija appeared in the pilot episode of Ryan Murphy's Golden Globe and Emmy-nominated ballroom drama Pose as a principal dancer, and was featured in Wu Tsang's film Into a Space for Love for Gucci and Frieze magazine. Other credits include A-Z of Aaliyah for i-d Magazine and MAC and Calvin Harris and Sam Smith's lyric video for "Promises". In 2017, she was made Overall Mother of the Royal House of LaBeija, and stepped down officially in 2019.

== Advocacy ==
Kia LaBeija is an advocate for many underrepresented communities, especially people living with HIV/AIDS. She has been invited to speak at Harvard, MIT, The New School, The Studio Museum in Harlem, Cooper Union, The MoMa, New York University, the New York Public Library, and Stanford University. POZ magazine placed her on the POZ 100 list of HIV/AIDS activists under 30. She has been featured on HIV Plus Magazine's 20 Most Amazing HIV Positive Women list.

== Accolades ==
In 2019, LaBeija was honored by Performance Space New York. She was listed in Dazeds 20 best photos of 2018 and PAPER Predictions: 100 People Taking Over 2019. She has been featured in W Magazine, Vogue Spain, Vanity Fair Italia, The New York Times, Numéro, Ascent, SLEEK, Paper Magazine, and Time Out New York.

== Personal life ==
She identifies herself as a queer cis-gender woman of color. She has been in a relationship with artist Taína Larot since 2014.
