= Plato III =

American rapper

- Born: Ryan Silva
- Genres: hip hop
- Occupations: Rapper, producer, songwriter
- Years active: 2015–present

Ryan Silva, known by his stage name Plato III, is an American rapper, singer-songwriter, and producer. He is the first rap artist to be signed to Polyvinyl Record Co. Silva's work has been profiled in BrooklynVegan,The Deli, The Daily Texan, Complex, The Austin Chronicle, KUTX, and Earmilk.

== Early life ==
Silva was raised in Abilene, Texas in a single parent home by his mother, who helped spark his love for music by introducing him to artists she grew up on such as Prince, Michael Jackson and N.W.A. He started making music with a Wal-Mart microphone and putting songs on Myspace as part of the group Native Strangers. They eventually signed to a local label.

== Music career ==
=== Life Before Death ===
"Natalie Portman", Silva's first single under the name Plato III was released on April 4, 2015, with co-production by Brockhampton's JOBA. It was featured on Complex's Pigeons & Planes. His second single "Only Rapper Alive" was released on June 20, 2015, with production by Eric Dingus and was once again featured on Pigeons & Planes. His debut album Life Before Death was released on May 14, 2016, and his song "Womankind" was named KUTX's "Song of the Day".

=== My First Word Was Juice ===
On November 21, 2016, "No Luv", the first single from his follow-up record was released. In November 2017, he released his sophomore album My First Word Was Juice. On May 31, 2019, his song "Illuminate" featuring Remi Lekun was included on the soundtrack for Netflix's Always Be My Maybe.

=== 9 Love Songs ===
Garnered comparisons to Kanye West's critically acclaimed 808s & Heartbreak by The Austin Chronicle, who noted "Where the Love Go?" as the standout track on a "dreamy" album."Love Is Free" was used prominently in the Tubi film Cons and Cougars.

=== The Devil Has Texas ===
Released June 17, 2022 by Polyvinyl Records, marking Plato III as the first rapper to be signed by the label. The album features a sample of Modest Mouse's "Trailer Trash" and features from Lil B and Mike Kinsella. Plato III debuted songs at SXSW prior to the release.

== Influences ==
Plato III has cited Kanye West as his favorite artist. He also has named Common, Mos Def, & Talib Kweli as influences.

== Let Me Be Frank ==
Let Me Be Frank is a micro-budget feature film written, directed, scored, produced, and starred in by Ryan Silva. It was released on streaming services on September 24, 2021. Silva detailed the filmmaking process in an essay for NoFilmSchool and an interview with ScriptMag.

== Discography ==
=== Studio albums ===
- Life Before Death (2016)
- My First Word Was Juice (2017)
- 9 Love Songs (2019)
- The Devil Has Texas (2022)
