= Curiosity (Wampire album) =

Studio album by Wampire
- Released: 2013
- Label: Polyvinyl Record Co.

Wampire chronology
Curiosity (2013)	Bazaar (2014)

Curiosity is a 2013 album by the American indie rock band Wampire. It was released on May 14, 2013 through Polyvinyl.

== Track listing ==
1. "The Hearse" 04:40
2. "Orchards" 02:59
3. "Spirit Forest" 03:08
4. "Giants" 04:07
5. "I Can't See Why" 02:49
6. "Outta Money" 04:43
7. "Trains" 03:26
8. "Snacks" 02:46
9. "Magic Light" 04:12

== Reception ==
Critical reviews for Curiosity have been positive and the album holds a rating of 69 on Metacritic, based on 14 reviews, indicating "generally favorable" reviews.
