= A Word Is Also a Picture of a Word =

Studio album by 31Knots
- Released: April 2, 2002
- Recorded: September, 2000 – September, 2001
- Genre: Math rock
- Label: 54º40' or Fight!

31Knots chronology
Climax / Anti-Climax (2000)	A Word Is Also a Picture of a Word (2002)	The Rehearsal Dinner EP (2002)

A Word Is Also a Picture of a Word is 31Knots third album. It was released on April 22, 2002. The title of the album is derived from a phrase written by Don DeLillo in his book Libra.

Professional ratings
Review scores
Source	Rating
AllMusic	4/5 stars

== Track listing ==
1. Preface – 0:41
2. Tower of the Middle of the Month – 3:29
3. E for Alpha – 4:56
4. Buy High Sell Low – 2:39
5. Breathe to Please Them – 5:14
6. Flight of the Moron – 1:16
7. Frozen Found Fire – 5:11
8. Myopic Fights – 4:04
9. Pity Has No Power – 3:51
10. Era of Artillery – 6:30
11. Surface Learning – 3:18

== Credits ==
- 31Knots – Main performer, Mixing
- Adam Selzer – Mixing
- Amy Annelle – Vocals
- Jason Powers – Mixing
- Kevin Nettleingham – Mastering
- Pat Kenneally – Engineer, Mixing
- Shane Deleon – Trumpet
