= The Timid =

The Timid EP

EP by the Like Young
- Released: 2005
- Genre: indie rock
- Label: Polyvinyl Record Co.
- Producer: Joe Ziemba

The Like Young chronology
So Serious (2004)	The Timid EP (2005)	Six at Midnight (2005)

The Timid EP is an EP by indie rock band the Like Young. Their first release for The Polyvinyl Record Company, it was released in 2005.

== Track listing ==
1. I've Been Used
2. Tempt Me
3. Don't Get Dead
