= Sixth in Sixes =

Studio album by XBXRX
- Released: September 2005
- Genre: Noise rock, hardcore
- Length: 25:36
- Label: Polyvinyl Records

XBXRX chronology
Gop Ist Minee (2001)	Sixth in Sixes (2005)	Wars (2007)

Sixth in Sixes is the second studio album by the rock band XBXRX. It was released in 2005 through Polyvinyl Records. The follow-up to 2001's Gop Ist Minee, the record quickly earned underground acclaim and gained such notable fans as Peaches and Sonic Youth.

== Track listing ==
All songs by XBXRX

1. "Paradosis" – 0:15
2. "Deaf Ears, Silent Voice" – 1:32
3. "Gold Cross" – 1:52
4. "Regret" – 1:25
5. "Fabricated Progression" – 1:05
6. "Hope Until We Can't" – 1:23
7. "Euphoria" – 0:31
8. "The End of Quitting" – 0:53
9. "Deceiver's Voice" – 1:31
10. "Beat Rolls On" – 2:21
11. "Pigs Wear Blue" – 1:28
12. "Sixth Extinction" – 1:16
13. "Breathing" – 1:29
14. "Against the Odds" – 1:54
15. "Self Indulgent" – 0:56
16. "Self Concept" – 1:48
17. "Make Force" – 1:11
18. "In Memory of Our Lives" – 2:46
