= Last Secrets =

Studio album by the Like Young
- Released: 2006
- Genre: indie rock
- Label: Polyvinyl Records
- Producer: Joe Ziemba

The Like Young chronology
| Six at Midnight (2005) | Last Secrets (2006) |

Last Secrets is the final album by indie rock band the Like Young. It was released in 2006 by Polyvinyl Records.

== Track listing ==
1. The Hell With This Whole Affair
2. For Money Or Love
3. Cold, Cold
4. Spell It Out
5. Some Closure
6. All The Wrong Reasons
7. Dead Eyes
8. Obviously Desperate
9. Writhe Like You Mean It
10. Something Fell Through
11. Almost Said Yes
12. Hard Stress, Soft Skin
13. Inner Fantasies

Alternate cover.
