= Wars (album) =

Studio album by XBXRX
- Released: April 10, 2007
- Recorded: August 17–18, 2006
- Genre: Noise/Hardcore
- Length: 27:13
- Label: Polyvinyl

XBXRX chronology
Sixth in Sixes (2005)	Wars (2007)	Sounds (2007)

Professional ratings
Review scores
Source	Rating
AllMusic	3.5/5 stars

Wars is the third album from American hardcore group XBXRX, released in April 2007 on Polyvinyl Records.

== Track listing ==
All songs by XBXRX.

1. "Centre Where Sight" – 4:06
2. "Freezing Water" – 2:06
3. "Sheets and Organs" – 2:09
4. "Here to Ruin the Party" – 2:19
5. "Eighth War" – 2:21
6. "Suffocation" – 1:14
7. "Minds" – 2:25
8. "Sons of Horn" – 1:21
9. "In Veins" – 2:17
10. "Towers of Silence" – 3:14
11. "Day Eleven" – 1:31
12. "Ear Ever Hear" – 2:16
