= Art Contest =

Studio album by The Like Young
- Released: 2003
- Genre: indie rock
- Label: Parasol Records
- Producer: Joe Ziemba

The Like Young chronology
"Looked Up" Plus Four (2002)	Art Contest (2003)	So Serious (2004)

Art Contest is the debut full-length album by indie rock band The Like Young. It was released in 2003 by Parasol Records.

== Track listing ==
1. "Expensive Tastes"
2. "Even if It's Getting Late"
3. "Nice People"
4. "Looked Up"
5. "Snobs and Slobs"
6. "I'm Old Fashioned"
7. "Leather Jackets"
8. "The Babes"
9. "My Problem"
10. "If Things Loosen Up"
11. "Be Honest With You"
