= It Was High Time to Escape =

Studio album by 31Knots
- Released: September 2, 2003
- Recorded: August 2002 – March 2003
- Genre: Math rock
- Label: 54º40' or Fight!

31Knots chronology
The Rehearsal Dinner EP (2002)	It Was High Time to Escape (2003)	The Curse of the Longest Day (2005)

Professional ratings
Review scores
Source	Rating
AllMusic	4/5 stars

It Was High Time to Escape is 31Knots' fourth album. It was released on September 2, 2003 by the 54º40' or Fight! label.

== Track listing ==
1. "A Half Life in Two Movements" – 1:46
2. "Darling, I" – 4:09
3. "The Gospel According to Efficiency" – 4:15
4. "No Sound" – 2:53
5. "We Still Have Legs" – 5:52
6. "Without Wine" – 3:46
7. "That Which Has No Name" – 4:56
8. "At Peace" – 4:08
9. "Played Out for Punchlines" – 3:58
10. "Matters From Ashes" – 4:17

== Personnel ==
- 31Knots - Main performer
- Ian Pellicci - Engineer, Mixing
- Jarrod Dandrea - Assistant Engineer
- Jay Pellicci - Drums, Engineer, Mixing
- Jay Winebrenner - Bass, Guitar
- Joe Haege - Guitar, Mixing, Piano, Sampling, Vocals
- Joe Kelly - Drums, Vocals
- Shayla Hason - Photography
- Tom Carr - Mastering
