= Steve Touchstone =

American musician

Steve Touchton
- Also known as: Steve Touchston, Steve Touchtstone, Stephen Touchton
- Born: Mobile, AL
- Instrument(s): Guitar, Electronics, Percussion
- Years active: 1998–present

Steve Touchton is an American musician who currently resides in Los Angeles. He was a founding member of the bands XBXRX and Kit. His current projects include the Noise music trio Remainderless and the Experimental music series Ex Im Ot.
