= Poised to Break =

Studio album by Sunday's Best
- Released: October 31, 2000
- Genres: Emo, indie rock, pop punk
- Length: 51:33
- Label: Polyvinyl Record Co.
- Producer: Tom Ackerman

Sunday's Best chronology
Where You Are Now (EP) (1999)	Poised to Break (2000)	The Californian (2002)

Poised to Break was the 2000 debut studio album by American emo rock band Sunday's Best.

== Reception ==
PopMatters writes that the album is "completely derivative". In Music We Trust was more positive, describing the album as "hooky, stylish, and full of bright beats". Lollipop Magazine describes the album's genre as "sometimes Knapsack, sometimes emo new wave".

Professional ratings
Review scores
Source	Rating
AllMusic	3/5 stars
Artistdirect	3/5 stars

== Track listing ==
1. "The Hardest Part" – 3:31
2. "Bruise Blue" – 3:41
3. "White Picket Fences" – 3:35
4. "Saccharine" – 3:48
5. "Indian Summer" – 3:18
6. "When Is Pearl Harbor Day?" – 4:05
7. "In Beat Like Trains" – 4:14
8. "Looks Like a Mess" – 5:50
9. "Winter-Owned" – 2:50
10. "Congratulations" – 16:37
