= Talk Like Blood =

Studio album by 31Knots
- Released: October 11, 2005
- Genre: Math rock, indie rock
- Label: Polyvinyl Records (US) / Own Records (Europe)

Professional ratings
Review scores
Source	Rating
Pitchfork Media	7.0/10.0
PopMatters	4/10
Stylus	C+
Tiny Mix Tapes	4/5 stars
AllMusic	4/5 stars

Talk Like Blood is the fifth full-length album by 31knots. It was released on October 11, 2005, by Polyvinyl Records in the United States and by Own Records in Europe.

== Track listing ==
1. "City of Dust" - 3:39
2. "Hearsay" - 3:59
3. "Thousand Wars" - 1:38
4. "Intuition Imperfected" - 3:27
5. "Chain Reaction" - 6:05
6. "Untitled (Interlude)" - 2:07
7. "A Void Employs a Kiss" - 3:18
8. "Proxy And Dominion" - 2:14
9. "Talk Like Blood" - 4:13
10. "Busy Is Bold" - 3:58
11. "Impromptu Disproving" - 3:26
