= The Snake the Cross the Crown =

American alternative indie band

- Origin: Huntsville, Alabama, United States
- Genres: Americana; Alt country Alternative rock Indie rock
- Labels: Equal Vision Records
- Members: Kevin Jones, Franklin Sammons, William Sammons, Mark Fate, Nate Higley
- Past members: Carl Marshall
- Website: snakecrosscrown.com

The Snake the Cross the Crown is an American indie/Americana band from Huntsville, Alabama signed to Equal Vision Records.

== History ==
Originally known as Curbside Service, the group released one album under this name, I Packed My Bags a Year in Advance, before changing to their present name. Their current name is a reference to the logo of Italian car company, Alfa Romeo. Kevin Jones' father owned a repair shop that burnt to the ground. The name is an homage to his father. They moved to Santa Barbara, California, and followed with an EP in 2003 before signing to Equal Vision, who put out a full-length from the band, Mander Salis, in 2004. The group then embarked on tours with Mewithoutyou, Armor for Sleep, Decibully, and Hot Rod Circuit; however, after rigorous touring, they became fed up with the lack of time they were able to spend writing and improving on their respective instruments, and cancelled the remainder of their touring schedule. They returned to the studio in 2006 and began to pursue a new direction, with less straight-ahead indie rock and more of a country and folk-tinged sound. The result of these efforts was released as Cotton Teeth in March 2007, by which time bassist/vocalist Carl Marshall had left the group.

On September 29, 2009 it was announced that The Snake The Cross The Crown were the subject of a documentary by filmmaker Nicholas Kleczewski called On A Carousel of Sound, We Go Round. The film premiered at the Louisville International Festival of Film on October 2, 2009. It was packaged as a two-disc DVD/CD set featuring the full-length film, plus an audio CD of 14 b-sides and newer recordings from the band. It was released on October 13, 2009 exclusively through The Snake The Cross The Crown's webstore at MerchNOW.com

On December 15, 2009, the band released a music video for the song "In Time." The video is part of the documentary film "On A Carousel of Sound, We Go Round," and the song can be found on the accompanying soundtrack.

== Members ==
Current members

- Franklin Sammons - guitar, vocals
- William Sammons - piano, keyboard, programming, vocals
- Kevin Jones - guitar, vocals
- Mark Fate - drums
- Nate Higley - bass

Former members

- Carl Marshall - bass, vocals

== Discography ==
- I Packed My Bags a Year in Advance (as Curbside Service, Waste of Time Records, 2002)
- Like a Moth Before a Flame (Waste of Time Records, 2003)
- Mander Salis (Equal Vision Records, 2004)
- Cotton Teeth (Equal Vision Records, 2007)
- On A Carousel of Sound, We Go Round (DVD/CD Techtronic Rocket Society / Equal Vision Records, 2009)
