= Pillar Point (band) =

- Origin: Seattle, Washington, United States
- Genres: Indie pop, synthpop
- Years active: 2013–present
- Labels: Polyvinyl Record Co.
- Website: Pillarpointmusic.com

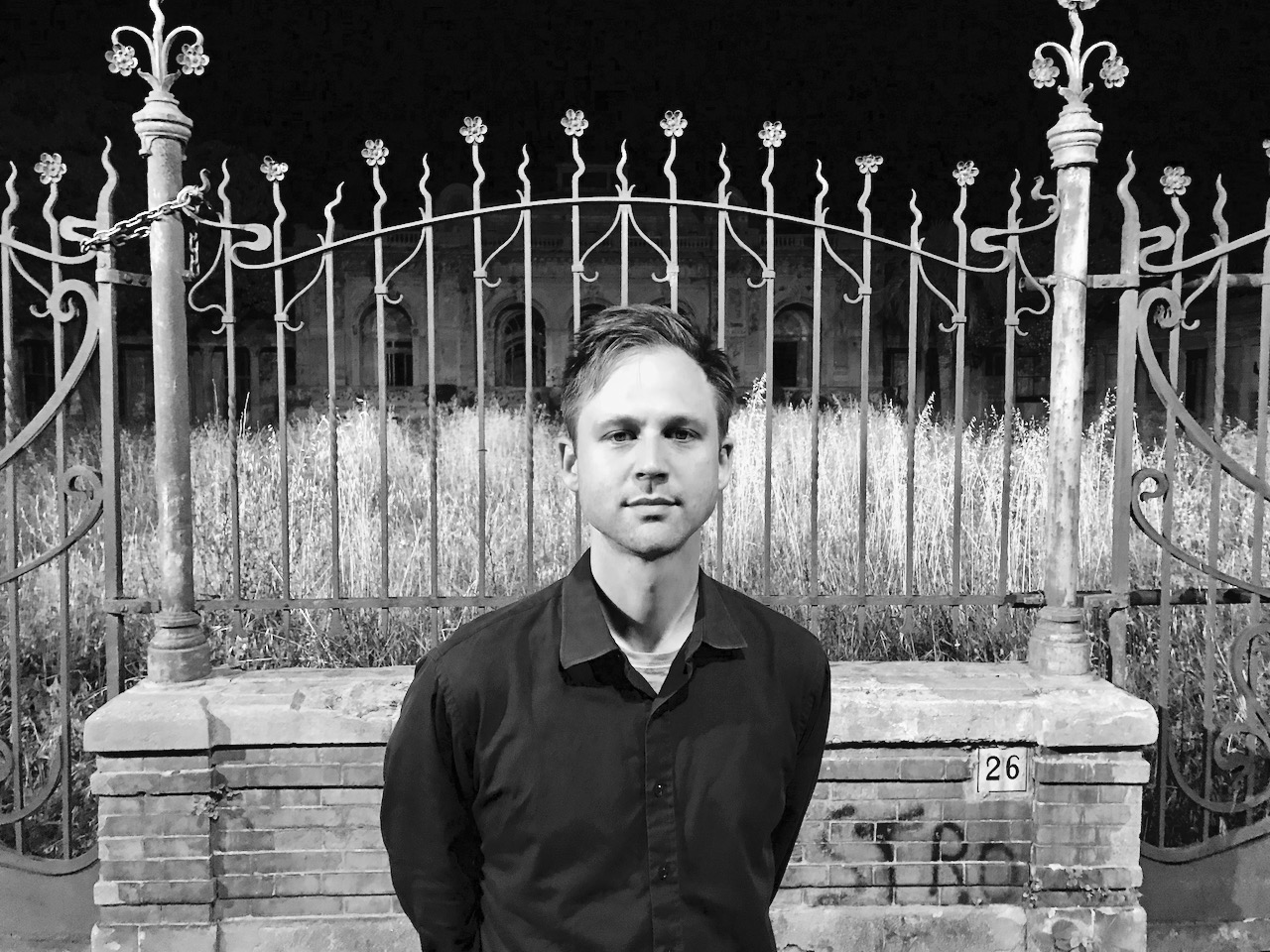

Pillar Point is an American indie pop, synthpop band based out of Seattle, Washington, United States.

== Biography ==
Pillar Point is the solo recording project of Scott Reitherman (also of Throw Me The Statue). In June 2013, the band signed with Polyvinyl Record Co. and unveiled the first single, “Diamond Mine,” which was later released as a 7" on September 3, 2013.

The self-titled full-length album, Pillar Point, was released the following year on February 25, 2014 on Polyvinyl. The album went on to receive press accolades with features in Stereogum, SPIN, and others. Following the album's release, Pillar Point embarked on national tours with of Montreal and Soft Swells.

The band has been remixed by Generationals, Ruby Suns, and Music Go Music. The band's music video for “Dreamin’” was featured on Vimeo’s Staff Picks VICE premiered the video for "Dove" starring Kia Labeija.

Musicians who have performed with Pillar Point include Lena Simon, Trent Moorman, and Terence Ankeny.

== Discography ==
=== Albums ===
- Pillar Point (CD/LP/cassette/digital) - Polyvinyl Record Co. - Released February 25, 2014
- Marble Mouth (CD/LP/cassette/digital) - Polyvinyl Record Co. - Released January 22, 2016

=== Singles ===
- ”Diamond Mine” (7"/digital) - Polyvinyl Record Co. - Released September 3, 2013
