= Ian Sweet =

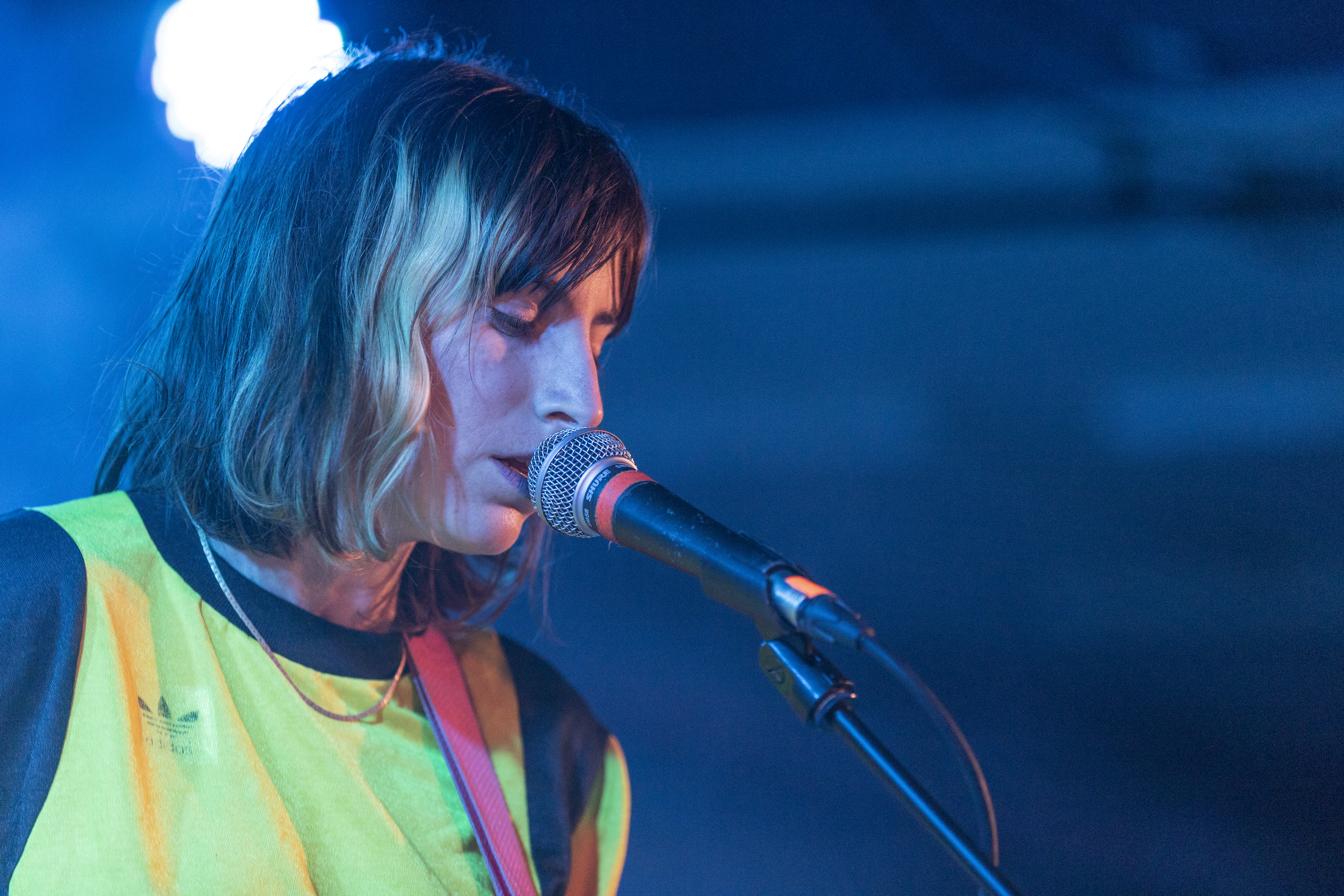
- Ian Sweet in 2019

Background information
- Origin: Los Angeles
- Genres: Indie rock
- Years active: 2013–present
- Labels: Polyvinyl, Hardly Art

Jilian Medford, better known by her stage name Ian Sweet, is an American indie rock musician from Los Angeles, California.

== History ==
As Ian Sweet, Medford has released five full-length albums. The first album, Shapeshifter, was released in 2016 via Hardly Art. The album was listed at number 33 on Stereogum's list of the "50 Best Albums of 2016". Ian Sweet was also listed as one of Stereogum's best new bands of 2016. In 2018, Medford followed up her debut with her second full-length album titled Crush Crusher, also on Hardly Art. The album received a 3.5 out of 5 rating from Rolling Stone.

In January 2020, Ian Sweet contributed to a benefit compilation in support of Bernie Sanders's 2020 presidential run. Organized by indie rock band Strange Ranger, the compilation was titled Bernie Speaks With the Community. Also in 2020, Ian Sweet contributed to Strange Ranger's benefit compilation The Song Is Coming from Inside the House, organized to benefit Groundswell's Rapid Response Fund in the wake of the COVID-19 pandemic.

Medford's third full-length album, Show Me How You Disappear, was released on March 5, 2021.

Medford's fourth album as Ian Sweet, Sucker, was released via Polyvinyl on November 3, 2023.

Medford's fifth full-length album, Shiverstruck, was released via Polyvinyl on July 24, 2026.

== Discography ==
Studio albums

- Shapeshifter (2016, Hardly Art)
- Crush Crusher (2018, Hardly Art)
- Show Me How You Disappear (2021, Polyvinyl)
- Sucker (2023, Polyvinyl)
- Shiverstruck (2026, Polyvinyl)
