= Pet Symmetry =

American emo band

- Origin: Chicago, Illinois, United States
- Genres: Emo, power pop, indie rock
- Years active: 2012–present
- Labels: Polyvinyl, Asian Man, Storm Chasers, Soft Speak, Suburbia, Big Scary Monsters
- Spinoff of: Dowsing
- Members: Erik Czaja; Marcus Nuccio; Evan Thomas Weiss
- Website: www.petsymmetryband.com

Pet Symmetry is an American emo band from Chicago, Illinois. The band formed in 2012, and they are currently signed to Storm Chaser Records. The band's name is a play on words taken from Stephen King's novel Pet Sematary.

Pet Symmetry's influences include Hot Snakes, the Promise Ring, Jimmy Eat World, Smoking Popes, and Harvey Danger.

== History ==
Pet Symmetry was formed in 2012 by Erik Czaja and Marcus Nuccio (both members of Chicago-based emo band Dowsing) and Evan Thomas Weiss (who performs solo material under the name Into It. Over It.).

The band released its first EP, Two Songs About Cars. Two Songs With Long Titles. in May 2013 via Asian Man Records. It released another EP the same month, a split with Dikembe on Storm Chasers Records.

Later that year in July, they released Five Songs On A Homemade Compact Disc (For A Summer Tour In 2013) on Storm Chasers Records. The EP includes two demos of songs that would later appear on their debut LP. These songs were chosen for a limited run of tour CDs that contained all of their previous material.

On November 25, 2014, the band released another EP, a split with Slingshot Dakota via Soft Speak Records.

In December 2014, Suburbia Records released a 7" box set featuring a split between Pet Symmetry and the Saddest Landscape.

On May 12, 2015, the band released its debut album titled Pets Hounds via Asian Man Records. The album's title is a play on The Beach Boys' album Pet Sounds.

On May 27, 2017, the band released its second album entitled Vision via Polyvinyl Record Co.

On August 2, 2017, the band released the recordings from their Audiotree Live performance via Bandcamp. They performed songs from their album Vision, as well as "My Exhausted Month (Of May)" from Pets Hounds and "A Detailed and Poetic Physical Threat to the Person Who Intentionally Vandalized my 1994 Dodge Intrepid Behind Kate's Apartment" from their first EP, Two Songs About Cars. Two Songs With Long Titles.

On May 25, 2018, they released their Reflection EP via Bandcamp. The EP includes a cover of the Ramones' "Pet Sematary".

== Band members ==
- Evan Thomas Weiss - lead vocals, bass guitar (2013–present)
- Erik Czaja - guitar, backing vocals (2013–present)
- Marcus Nuccio - drums, backing vocals (2013–present)

== Discography ==
=== Studio albums ===
- Pets Hounds (2015, Asian Man Records, Big Scary Monsters (UK/Europe))
- Vision (2017, Polyvinyl Record Co.)
- Future Suits (2021, Storm Chasers Ltd., Asian Man Records)
- Big Symmetry (2025, Storm Chasers Ltd., Asian Man Records)

=== EPs and splits ===
- Two Songs About Cars. Two Songs With Long Titles. (2013, Asian Man)
- Pet Symmetry/Dikembe (2013, Storm Chasers)
- Five Songs On A Homemade Compact Disc (For A Summer Tour In 2013) (2013, Storm Chasers)
- Pet Symmetry/Slingshot Dakota (2014, Soft Speak)
- Pet Symmetry/The Saddest Landscape (2015, Suburbia)
- Reflections (2018, self-release)
