= Stagnant Pools =

American rock band

- Origin: Bloomington, Indiana, United States
- Genres: Shoegaze; Noise rock Art rock
- Years active: 2010–present
- Labels: Polyvinyl Records
- Members: Bryan Enas; Doug Enas
- Website: www.stagnantpools.com

Stagnant Pools are an American two-piece band from Bloomington, Indiana, United States, who have been compared to acts such as Sonic Youth and Joy Division by the Chicago Reader, and Pitchfork. The ensemble consists of Bryan and Douglass Enas.

On May 17, 2012, it was announced that the group's first album, Temporary Room, would be released on August 7, 2012, by Polyvinyl Records.

The band has supported Maxïmo Park, Japandroids, David Bazan, and School of Seven Bells, on tour.

== Personnel ==
- Bryan Enas – vocals, guitar
- Doug Enas – drums

== Discography ==
=== Albums ===
- Temporary Room (Polyvinyl Records, August 2012)
- Geist (Polyvinyl, June 10, 2014)
