= Aloha (band) =

American indie rock band

- Origin: United States
- Genres: Experimental pop, Indie
- Years active: 1997-present
- Labels: Polyvinyl Records
- Members: Cale Parks; Matthew Gengler; Tony Cavallario; T.J. Lipple
- Past members: Eric Koltnow; Anthony Buehrer

Aloha is an American indie rock band currently signed to Polyvinyl Records. It features Cale Parks, Matthew Gengler, Tony Cavallario and T.J. Lipple.

== History ==
Aloha began with Tony and Matthew in the summer of 1997 in Bowling Green, Ohio. One of the few bands to ever actually get a record deal based on a demo tape, the band spent time based out of Cleveland. In recent years, Aloha has operated from a number of bases, doing their writing, rehearsing and living in Chicago, Washington D.C., Cleveland, Cincinnati, Rochester, Pittsburgh and Altoona. They have shared the stage with the likes of Q and Not U, Ted Leo, Clinic, as well as Cex and Joan of Arc, two bands in which Cale Parks has been a member.

In 2002, New Music said of their album Sugar, "In the wake of That's Your Fire, Aloha's breathtaking and complex collection of jazz-based, vibraphone-enhanced lullabies, the band's sophomore release hits like a hurricane."

Tony and T.J. began playing together during a lull in Aloha's schedule in late 2002, when they both lived in Pittsburgh. T.J. joined the band in May 2003, when Cale, Tony and Matthew joined him at his grandpa's empty house in Altoona, Pennsylvania. There they began writing 2004's Here Comes Everyone, though at the time they didn't know it. With T.J. came a more focused approach to making music and a host of new tools including marimba, homemade mellotrons, organs and tape manipulations. T.J.'s skilled drumming also allowed Cale to move to the piano on occasion.

In 2010, Spin magazine said, "They're emboldened by singer Cale Parks' ability to sing like Lou Barlow as a poofy-sleeved eco wizard." Notably, Cale Parks is Aloha's drummer, not singer.

Their latest album, Little Windows Cut Right Through, was released in May 2016.

== Discography ==
=== Albums ===
- 1999 - ...the Nonbelievers EP
- 2000 - That's Your Fire
- 2002 - Sugar
- 2004 - Here Comes Everyone
- 2006 - Some Echoes
- 2007 - Light Works
- 2010 - Home Acres
- 2016 - Little Windows Cut Right Through

=== Singles ===
- 1998 - "Hand Numbered 7""
- 2002 - "Aloha/Lovesick Split"
- 2004 - "Boys in the Bathtub"

=== Compilation albums ===
- 2000 - Heroes Compilation
- 2001 - Redirection
- 2002 - Playing 4 Square 2
- 2006 - What to Do with Everything

=== Cassettes ===
- 1997 - Demos
