= Hail Social =

Hail Social was a rock band from Philadelphia.

The band released several self-made EPs at their concerts, sometimes referred to by color. In April, 2005, Dine Alone Productions pressed Hail Social's first 7-inch, a limited edition single release. Their debut self-titled album was released by Polyvinyl Records in August, 2005, and their Warning Sign 7-inch came out in March, 2006, also on Polyvinyl. Their second album titled Modern Love & Death was self-released on March 20, 2007.

The band toured with Interpol and The Secret Machines in the Fall of 2004. They then toured the UK with The Ordinary Boys in the Autumn of 2005.

As of June 18, 2009, the band stated that they were "no longer an active band and has not been for years now." Founder Dayve Hawk now records original electronic music and remixes as Memory Tapes.
