= The M's =

- Origin: Chicago, Illinois
- Genres: Indie rock, neopsychedelia, noise pop, power pop, garage rock revival
- Years active: 2000–present
- Labels: Polyvinyl

The M's is an American indie rock band from Chicago.

== History ==
The M's were formed in 2000 by Josh Chicoine, Joey King, Steve Versaw and Robert Hicks. Chicoine, King and Versaw met in the winter of 1999 and began collaborating in a makeshift studio in Chicago's Bucktown neighborhood in which the short lived group, Sanoponic, was formed. After Sanoponic's dissolution, they began working on new material with Hicks who had the name The M's in mind for a new project. Their debut EP appeared in 2002 on Brilliante Records, followed by a full-length in 2004. They signed with Polyvinyl Record Co. for their 2006 and 2008 releases. Glenn Rischke joined the group in 2008 for the release of their last recording to date "Real Close Ones". The group decided to go into "a long hiatus" on March 6, 2009. In 2011, The M's released a digital-only EP "The Personal Touch" on Movings label, recorded collaboratively with electronic trio from Chicago TV Pow.

== Members ==
- Josh Chicoine - vocals, guitar
- Steve Versaw - drums
- Joey King - vocals, bass
- Robert Hicks - vocals, guitar
- Glenn Rischke - Keyboards, percussion (Joined 2008/2009)

== Discography ==
- The M's EP (Brillante Records, 2002)
- The M's LP (Brillante, 2004)
- Split with Dr. Dog (Polyvinyl Record Co., 2006)
- Future Women (Polyvinyl, 2006)
- Real Close Ones (Polyvinyl, 2008)
- The Personal Touch with TV Pow (Movings, 2011)
