= Tancred (band) =

American musical project

- Genres: Indie rock; indie pop; power pop
- Years active: 2011–present
- Labels: Polyvinyl (–present); Topshelf (2013–2015); No Sleep (2011–2012)
- Spouse: Jenny Owen Youngs (m. 2021)
- Members: Jess Abbott
- Website: tancredmusic.com

Tancred is the stage name of former Now, Now guitarist Jess Abbott.

As Tancred, Abbott has released four full-length albums to date. Her first album, titled Capes, was released in 2011 on No Sleep Records. In 2013, Abbott signed to Topshelf Records and released her self-titled second full-length album. In 2016, Abbott signed to Polyvinyl Records and released her third full-length album titled Out of the Garden. On March 27, 2018, she premiered her new single Reviews and announced an album, Nightstand, that was released on June 1, 2018, via Polyvinyl.

Out of the Garden was recorded by OFF!'s Steven McDonald and That Dog.'s Anna Waronker, and was praised by many outlets, including NPR Music, which declared: "Out of the Garden is just phenomenal... this to me feels like a breakthrough."

A video for Tancred's song "Pens" was handpicked for NPR Music's "Songs We Love" series and featured a cameo by Sadie Dupuis of Speedy Ortiz.

Tancred has toured with Foxing, Julien Baker, Weaves, and Jessica Hernandez & The Deltas; they also performed at the 2016 Riot Fest.

== Discography ==
=== Studio albums ===
- Capes (2011)
- Tancred (2013)
- Out of the Garden (2016)
- Nightstand (2018)

=== EPs ===
- String & Twine (2011)

=== Singles ===
- "Birthday Candles" (2017)
