= Sunday's Best =

American rock band (1997–2003)

- Origin: Los Angeles, California, United States
- Genres: Emo, indie rock, pop punk
- Years active: 1997–2003
- Label: Polyvinyl
- Members: Ian Moreno; Pedro Benito (1997–2001); Ed Reyes; Tom Ackerman; James Tweedy (2001–2003)

Sunday's Best was an American emo band formed in 1997. It dissolved in 2003.

== History ==
The band's start came at KXLU, Loyola Marymount University's college radio station, where guitarist Ian Moreno, singer/bassist Ed Reyes, and drummer Tom Ackerman (formerly of Skiploader) all worked at in the late 1990s. Moreno and Reyes started the band with singer/guitarist Pedro Benito, a friend of Reyes's, and recorded the band's first 7" single in 1998, before recruiting Ackerman to play drums. In 1999, they put out their first EP, the seven-song Where You Are Now, and in 2000, they followed with their first LP, Poised to Break, on Polyvinyl. In 2002 they released their second album, The Californian. The band slowly parted ways over the next few years. Frontman Ed Reyes and guitarist Ian Moreno started a new band, The Little Ones. Benito went on to play in The Jealous Sound while James Tweedy played in The Bronx. Tom Ackerman joined Post-Hardcore band, The Kite-Eating Tree.

== Song usage in the media ==
Sunday's Best appeared in the Amped series of games. The songs featured include "Don't Let it Fade" and "Our Left Coast Ambitions". "Brave, but Brittle..." was featured in Amped 2. The song "Without Meaning" appears in the film Waiting... and other tracks have appeared on the short-lived animated television shows Clone High and Undergrads. The band's song "Indian Summer" was used on Fox show The Loop during the episode "Bear Drop Soup". In Gilmore Girls series, "Saccharine" can be heard playing in the background of a party in the episode "Keg! Max!".

== Discography ==
- Where You Are Now (EP) (1999, Crank! A Record Company)
- Poised to Break (2000, Polyvinyl)
- The Californian (2002, Polyvinyl)
