= Decibully =

- Origin: Milwaukee, Wisconsin, USA
- Genres: Indie rock, folk
- Years active: 2001–2011
- Labels: Polyvinyl, Listening Party
- Website: Myspace page

Decibully was an indie rock band based out of Milwaukee, Wisconsin that formed in 2001 and played their final show early in 2011.

== History ==
Since 1992, vocalist and guitarist William Seidel and guitarist Ryan Weber had been playing in the same band, which went through a variety of names, before settling on Camden. They released their debut studio album Reel Time Canvas (2000) through the label Grand Theft Autumn. Sometime after this, Seidel served as a keyboardist for the Promise Ring, who went on a two-week tour with Camden in April and May 2001. Shortly afterwards, Weber joined the Promise Ring in time for them to record their fourth studio album, Wood/Water, in the United Kingdom. While this was occurring, Seidel formed Decibully in late 2001 with guitarist W. Kenneth Siebert, formerly of Since by Man, and keyboardist Nick Westfahl. Following their first show, Weber and fellow the Promise Ring bandmate Jason Gnewikow were drafted on lapsteel guitar and drums, respectively.

Justin Klug of the Etiquette then joined as their bassist; the band practiced and continued performing gigs between October 2001 and October 2002. They self-released the album You Might Be a Winner. You Might Be a Loser, which was only available at their shows. Following the breakup of the Promise Ring in October 2002, Gnewikow relocated to New York City, prompting him to be replaced by Aaron Vold, previously of the Teacups. Around this time, banjoist Eric Holliday joined Decibully. In January 2003, the band went on a US tour of the Southern states. They then re-entered the studio to recorded their next album, which lasted until July 2003. In the midst of this, Westfahl left and was replaced by Nicholas Sanborn. Chris Rosenau of Pele, who had previously helped record a Camden demo, contacted Polyvinyl Records to tell them about Decibully, and promptly sent the label a copy of what they were working on. After discussions and another stint in the studio, the band signed to Polyvinyl in July 2003, but was not made public until the following month.

In September 2003, they released a three-track sampler with two songs from City of Festivals and one from their debut. In October 2003, the label released the band's next album, City of Festivals; it had been delayed two weeks because of an issue at the pressing plant. In October and November 2003, the band went on a cross-country US tour, before ending the year with two shows in Milwaukee. In February 2004, they went on a Midwestern tour, which was followed by a two-month trek across the West Coast with Onelinedrawing, Cardia, and Roy. During this trek, they debuted new material. They went on a two-month East Coast tour in April and May 2004; after its conclusion, the band continued writing and recording for their next album. Following this, they embarked on a Midwestern tour in July 2004, and continued recording until August 2004. They went on another cross-country tour in October and November 2004, with Kepler and Shearwater. While in California, they shot a music video for "Penny, Look Down". They released their second studio album Sing Out America! on March 8, 2005, which was promoted with tours of Europe and North America with the Snake the Cross the Crown and Codeseven. Later in the year, they toured with Lucero and Blackpool Lights.

Decibully's final two albums, World Travels Fast & "Self Titled" (Ta Da, Booyah, Chainsaw, Us) were released by Listening Party Records. Decibully successfully toured the US, Canada & Europe multiple times. Each record was recorded & produced in-house by Ryan Weber.

== Discography ==
- You Might Be a Winner. You Might Be a Loser — January, 2002
- Decibully (3 Song EP) — September, 2003
- City of Festivals — Polyvinyl Records, October, 2003
- Sing Out America! — Polyvinyl, March, 2005
- "Tour EP '06" - August, 2006
- World Travels Fast - [Listening Party], December, 2009
- Self-Titled (Ta Da, Booyah, Chainsaw, Us)- [Listening Party] April, 2011

== Members ==
=== Final line-up ===
- William J. Seidel (vocals, guitar, percussion, Rhodes) - Founder, (ex-Camden, New Sense, The Promise Ring)
- W. Kenneth Siebert (guitarist, pan flute) - Original Member (ex-Since By Man. Current: No Future)
- Ryan Weber (lap steel, synths, guitar, percussion), (ex-Camden, New Sense, The Promise Ring. Current: Eric & Magill)
- Nicholas Sanborn (keyboardist, accordion, rhodes) (ex-Headlights. Current: Megafaun, Sylvan Esso)
- Aaron Vold (Drums, Percussion) (ex-Teacups, Por Avion)
- Andy Menchal (bass) (ex-Temper Temper)

=== Former members ===
- Jason Gnewikow (drums), ex-The Promise Ring
- Nick Westfahl (keyboards) - Original Member
- Eric "Doc" Holliday (banjo, electric guitars, backing vocals, harmonica)
- Justin Klug (bass)
- Jim Neumyer (guitar, percussion)
