= XBXRX =

American post-hardcore band

- Origin: Mobile, Alabama, United States
- Genres: Post-hardcore; noise rock; no wave
- Years active: 1998–2012
- Labels: Polyvinyl, 5RC
- Members: Steve Touchstone; Vice Cooler
- Past members: Alicia Pearman; Michael Clark; Zachary Tullis; Devin Istre; Blakely Thompson; Weasel Walter; Paul Costuros; Ed Rodriguez; Kyle H Mabson; Josh Taylor

XBXRX is an American rock band formed in 1998 in Mobile, Alabama, United States. Their early sound was no wave-influenced, but became more improvised and deconstructed, moving away from using the synthesizers that typify new wave. They are a collective with a revolving cast of musicians, including Steve Touchstone, Weasel Walter, and Vice Cooler. In 2002, Wesley Willis wrote a song dedicated to the band. For many years the collective resided in Oakland, California, where they finished working on their last full-length record, Wars, which was released in April 2007. In 2008 they were working on a record of improv based pieces titled "Sound" and splits with Mika Miko and Japanther. As of 2010, they have regrouped, and relocated to Los Angeles releasing new music and playing shows around California with their new line up.

== Early years ==
On February 27, 1998, after attending a concert by Unwound and Deerhoof at Jaycee Hall in Biloxi, Mississippi, the band started as a trio, using a simple drum set, guitar and an inexpensive Radio Shack synthesizer. Their early sets consisted of very loose, improvised song structures. After a solid lineup they made their first public performance at a friend's birthday party in May 1998. In 1999, the band hit the road for the first time with a van that belonged to the drummer's mother. Eventually all of the members either graduated early or dropped out and went on tour more or less full time.

== 2000-2002 ==
In summer of 2000, the band went into the studio to record some songs with producer Steve Albini. The sessions would turn into the band's first real full length, Gop Ist Minee which was released on Kill Rock Stars sister label 5RC. The album was released in January of the next year and was followed by tours with Unwound, Deerhoof, QandnotU, and the Sissies. In between shows, they recorded their Clear EP (with Ian Mackaye) and several singles, including the Quintron and Miss Pussycat collaboration single, "Mardi Gras", which was recorded by Tim Kerr, and the Vern Rumsey-produced "Hold Onto Your Skulls". In 2002, the band took a break.

== 2003-2005 ==
Weasel Walter had become a fan of XBXRX after seeing multiple Chicago performances between 1999 and 2001. He had kept in touch with the band, and in 2003, when Touchstone and Cooler moved the band from Alabama to California, they asked Walter to join the band as their new drummer and enlisted Paul Costuros (of Total Shutdown) to fill in on bass duties.

In April 2003, they did their first tour with the new lineup, opening for Holy Molar. They quickly started working in the studio and opened for Sonic Youth and Peaches. The end result was a contract with Polyvinyl Records which produced the band's follow-up to Gop Ist Minee, Sixth in Sixes.

== 2006-2008 ==
The band recorded their next two full-length albums Wars (Polyvinyl 2007) and Sounds (Important Records, 2007). While Wars focuses on their punk and new wave background, Sounds was dedicated to the opposite: studio experiments and improvised material which had only been reserved for their live shows.

During 2007, the band reunited with original drummer, M Clark, moving Weasel Walter to bass. They did three more North American tours and one European tour. The former with Melt Banana.

== 2009 ==
Un Usper was released on June 3, 2009 as the band's latest album. It is mixed, produced, and released by the band as a download only, donation based record.

== 2010 ==
"O" is a 10-song 7" which was released in September 2010 on Polyvinyl Records. "O" is a return to form for the band harkening back to their Sixth in Sixes era. The band line up now consists of Vice Cooler, and Steve Touchstone, in addition to new members Kyle H. Mabson and Josh Taylor (of Friends Forever, and Foot Village).

== Discography ==
=== Albums ===
- Greatest CD-R (ODM, 1998)
- Love Songs for the Blind (Anal Log, 1999)
- Gop Ist Minee (5RC, 2001)
- Sixth in Sixes (Polyvinyl, 2005)
- Wars (Polyvinyl, 2007)
- Sounds (Important Records, 2007)
- Un Usper (Self Released, 2009)

=== Singles and EPs ===
- "xbxrx" CD-R (Nothing Fancy Just Music [aka NFJM], 1998)
- "Song Known As" (NFJM, 1998)
- "We Are All Dying" (1998)
- "Science In The Shape Of Birds" (split with Quintron, Bobby Conn, Zeek Sheck) (TOYO, 2000)
- "Hold Onto Your Skulls" (ARKAM, 2001)
- "Mardi Gras" (GSL, 2001)
- "Split with Sick Lipstick" (DELETED ART, 2002)
- Clear EP (NOVA/ TAPES, 2002)
- 10 Bands (split with Erase Errata, Tracy And The Plastics and Peaches) (NFJM, 2002)
- "We Hate The President" (Narnack, 2003)
- "Last" (NFJM, 2004)
- "split with Total Shutdown" (double 5") (ROCK IS HELL, 2005)
- "split with An Albatross" (GSL, 2005)
- "O" 7" (Polyvinyl, 2010)

=== Videos ===
- NFJM 1V (NFJM, 1998)
- NFJM 2V (NFJM, 1999)
- NFJM 3V (NFJM, 2000)
- NFJM 4V (NFJM, 2000)
- NFJM 5V (split with Deerhoof) (NFJM, 2001)
- NFJM 6V (NFJM, 2004)
- KRS Video Fanzine (Kill Rock Stars, 2005)

=== Compilations ===
- P.O.W! records presents... Knockout!!! (POW!, 2000)
- Troubleman Unlimited Mixtape (Troubleman Unlimited, 2002)
- Kitra Vol. 3 (Powerbunny 4x4 records, 2001)
