= Their / They're / There =

American indie rock band

- Origin: Chicago, Illinois, United States
- Genres: Midwest emo; emo; indie rock; math rock
- Years active: 2011–2015, 2020-present
- Labels: Polyvinyl; Topshelf
- Members: Evan Weiss; Matthew Frank; Jared Karns
- Past members: Mike Kinsella
- Website: http://www.tttmusic.com/

Their / They're / There is an indie rock band from Chicago, Illinois. All three members are prominent figures in the Chicago indie scene, having each been a part of numerous noteworthy projects based in the area. The group released their first two EPs, Their / They're / There and Analog Weekend in 2013, before taking a lengthy hiatus.

== History ==
Evan Weiss first met Mike Kinsella when Kinsella asked Weiss to play as a supporting act at his record release show for the Owen album Ghost Town on November 11, 2011, at the Beat Kitchen in Roscoe Village, the location of Their / They're / There's second show. "About a month later," Weiss was approached by his friend Matthew Frank about starting a new band. Weiss initially expressed interest in forming the group in order to play bass again, as he had previously done in his early bands such as The Progress. Some time later, at the suggestion of Weiss, Frank approached Kinsella in the audience of one of Weiss' sets, asking him to join the group. Kinsella initially joined under the incorrect assumption that Weiss would be playing guitar and writing songs while Frank would be playing bass, though he later stated that "it turns out that he's [Frank], like, way better than me and Evan at the guitar." The recruiting of Kinsella marked the first time he had played drums as an official member in a band since Owls' breakup in 2002. The band was first announced in mid-2012 with the creation of a Facebook page revealing only the initials of each member in the page's description. After some speculation, the band revealed their lineup on September 9 of that year by posting "cat is out of the bag. evan weiss. mike kinsella. matthew frank. [sic]" Weiss denies the labeling of the band as a "supergroup", reasoning that "nobody starts a band because they want to have hype built around it."

Their / They're / There released their self-titled debut EP on April 20, 2013 (Record Store Day) through Polyvinyl Record Co., on which Kinsella's project Owen is signed. The release was followed by a short stint of two shows in Chicago and one in Lawrence, Kansas. Their first show was at Reckless Records in Wicker Park on the day of the debut EP's release. The band continues to play shows regularly in the US, especially during December 2013 while on a five-date tour with Mansions and Birthmark. Their / They're / There also toured Japan across October and November alongside Weiss's Into It. Over It. and Kinsella's Owen. They recorded their second EP, Analog Weekend, during the summer of that year "directly to tape" with producer Ed Rose. Analog Weekend was released on December 10 as a joint venture between Polyvinyl and Topshelf Records with a cassette release from Polyvinyl collecting the band's first two EPs, entitled T / T / T, released on the same day.

In April 2014, Kinsella revealed that "Evan and Matt just started working on the first [Their / They're / There] full-length like a week or two ago. Those guys are going to get the skeletons of a few songs and then we'll start practicing." Weiss stated in August 2014 that Their / They're / There are "definitely planning" to release a full-length album, although the members have "all been kind of busy with other things", further elaborating that "we want to do more with the band, it's just it's such a casual thing and I think if it became un-casual that it would lose its charm and why we kind of all enjoy doing it." Throughout 2014 and 2015, indications of continuing work on a Their / They're / There album were made through social media: Frank sporadically posted video clips of song ideas on the band's Facebook page, and Weiss posted a photo of Frank working on the Their / They're / There album to his Instagram profile. In a 2016 Reddit AMA, Weiss said of the prospect of a new Their / They're / There album "no more ttt right now, unfortunately. all super busy. [sic]" and "plans changed! not right now. maybe one day! [sic]"

During a Twitter AMA, Weiss announced new material to be released in 2022, with Jared Karns of Kiss Kiss taking over drum duties from Mike Kinsella. Following this, on October 21 of the same year, their debut album, Their / They're / Three was released, with a support slot on part of Covet's late fall Rebirth tour.

== Members ==
Current:

- Evan Thomas Weiss – lead vocals, bass (2012-2015, 2020–present)
- Matthew Frank – guitar, backing vocals (2012-2015, 2020–present)
- Jared Karns - drums (2020–present)

Former:

- Mike Kinsella - drums (2012-2015)

== Discography ==
Album

- Their / They're / Three (2022)

EPs

- Their / They're / There (2013)
- Analog Weekend (2013)
- Them Dogs (Split w/ Pacemaker) (2022)

Compilations

- T / T / T (2013)

Music videos

- "New Blood" (2013)
