= 31Knots =

American band

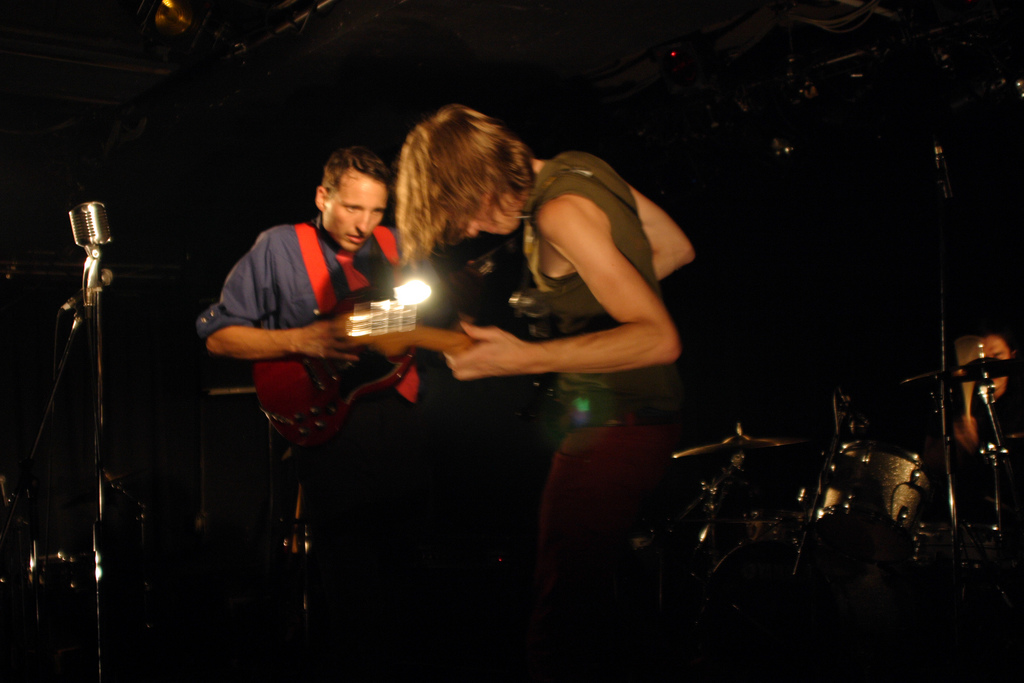
- 31Knots playing live in 2008.

Background information
- Origin: Portland, Oregon, United States
- Genres: Math rock, indie rock
- Years active: 1997–present
- Label: Polyvinyl Records
- Members: Joe Haege; Jay Winebrenner; Jay Pellicci
- Past members: Mark Walsh; Joe Kelly

31Knots is an American math rock band based in Portland, Oregon, United States, by guitarist Joe Haege and bassist Jay Winebrenner and drummer Mark Walsh. It was founded in Chicago in 1997. In 1999 the band added Joe Kelly as a drummer; in 2003 he left and was replaced by Jay Pellicci of Dilute. Early albums explored the limits of a guitar-bass-drums rock trio, while more recent work has added samples, piano, and increasingly skewed songwriting that push 31Knots' music into an ever more difficult to categorize genre. They have toured Europe several times since 2004.

== Discography ==
=== Albums ===
- Algut Allbrain (1997 - RangHok)
- Climax / Anti-Climax (Jan 4, 2000 - RangHok / Mar 19, 2009 (Re-Release) - Polyvinyl)
- A Word Is Also a Picture of a Word (Oct 1, 2002 - 54º40' or Fight!)
- It Was High Time To Escape (Sep 2, 2003 - 54º40' or Fight!)
- Talk Like Blood (Oct 11, 2005 - Own Records (Europe) / Polyvinyl (US))
- The Days and Nights of Everything Anywhere (Mar 6, 2007 - Polyvinyl)
- Worried Well (Aug 19, 2008 - Polyvinyl)
- Trump Harm (Jun 7, 2011 - Polyvinyl)

=== EPs ===
- The Rehearsal Dinner EP (Mar 12, 2002 - 54º40' or Fight!)
- The Curse of the Longest Day (Nov 1, 2004 - Own Records (Europe) / Jul 12, 2005 - Polyvinyl (US))
- ep:Polemics (Nov 7, 2006 - Polyvinyl)
