= Paris, Texas (band) =

American punk rock and emo band

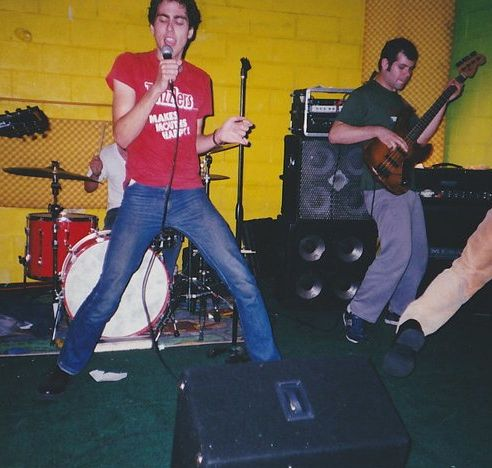
- Paris, Texas performing in Indianapolis, Indiana, in the early 2000s

Background information
- Origin: Madison, Wisconsin, U.S.
- Genres: Punk rock; emo
- Years active: 1997–2005
- Labels: Polyvinyl; New Line
- Past members: Scott Sherpe – vocals; Matt Tennessen – bass; Nolan Treolo – guitar; Sam Vinz – drums; Nick Zinkgraf – guitar; Matt Mangan – guitar

Paris, Texas was an American punk rock and emo band signed to New Line Records.

== Background ==
Paris, Texas was formed in Madison, Wisconsin, in December 1997 by Scott Sherpe, Sam Vinz, Nick Zinkgraf (all three of whom were college roommates at the time), Matt Tennessen and Matt Mangan. They recorded a five-song demo tape in January 1998 in Rainer Maria bassist (and Matt Tennessen's former Ezra Pound band mate) Kaia Fischer's basement and played their first show at Whole Music Club in Minneapolis with Rainer Maria the next month on Valentine's Day.

Rainer Maria drummer Bill Keuhn brought the band's demo to the attention of Polyvinyl Records and were signed shortly thereafter, releasing a self-titled EP in the fall of 1998, and full-length album So, You Think it's Hot Here? in October, 1999. Guitarist Matt Mangan departed shortly after its release and was replaced by Nolan Treolo. The Brazilliant EP followed in October, 2000.

A friend who was an intern at New Line Records shared a demo recording of "Hip Replacement" with the label heads, which led to the band being signed and beginning work on Like You Like An Arsonist, which was released in 2004 after an eight-month recording session and the band relocating to Milwaukee.

According to CMJ New Music Magazine:

”Furious punk guitars that sound more rock than emo, backed by chaotic but somehow precise drumming...it's hard to believe Paris Texas were ever considered emo at all - there's much more bark than whine.”

A remix of the song "Bombs Away" is featured on the Blade: Trinity soundtrack.

== Discography ==
- Like You Like An Arsonist - New Line Records, Released 2004
1. "Bombs Away" (3:14)
2. "Action Fans! Help Us!" (3:14)
3. "Like You Like an Arsonist" (3:37)
4. "Rebel Radio" (3:05)
5. "White Eyes" (3:25)
6. "Your Death" (3:43)
7. "Strike My Heart" (3:50)
8. "One Hot Coma" (3:29)
9. "Hip Replacement" (3:45)
10. "Better Off for Being Worse" (3:36)
11. "Gemini" (3:33)
- Action Fans Help Us! - Polyvinyl Record Co., Released 2003
1. "Action Fans Help Us!" (3:10)
2. "Gemini" (3:31)
3. "Your Death" (3:40)
4. "One Hot Coma" (3:28)
5. "Strike My Heart" (3:50)
- Brazilliant - Polyvinyl Record Co., Released 10/17/2000
1. "Le Tigre" (2:41)
2. "Dress Stress" (2:54)
3. "Razor New Neighbors" (2:34)
4. "Future Scars" (3:00)
5. "400,000" (3:20)
- So, You Think it's Hot Here? - Polyvinyl Record Co., Released 10/21/1999
1. "Cadillac of High Hair"
2. "Four Feet"
3. "Das Wolf"
4. "Silver"
5. "Heart Full of Napalm"
6. "Cemetery City"
7. "The Driver"
8. "Lt. Peterson"
9. "Goodbye"
10. "Rotten Apples"
- Paris, Texas EP - Polyvinyl Record Co., Released 10/01/1998
1. "One Heater"
2. "Dating A Dancer"
3. "In The Back"
4. "Without Even Kissing"
