= Volcano, I'm Still Excited!! =

US musical group

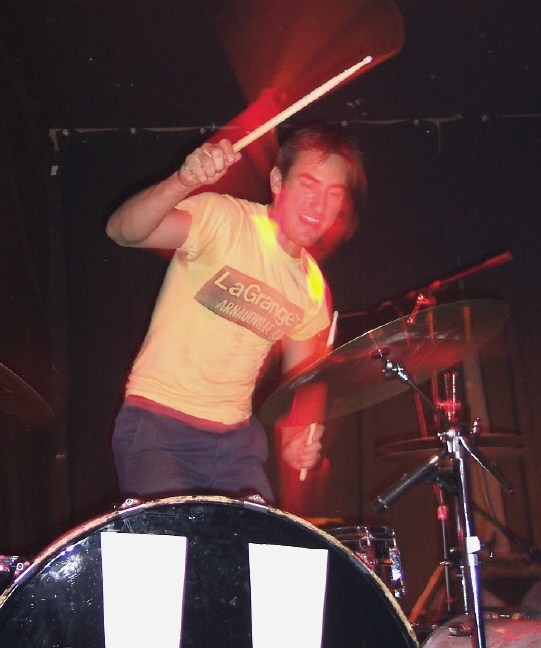
- John Robinette performing at Mojo's in Columbia, Missouri, 2004

Background information
- Origin: Austin, Texas and Brooklyn, New York
- Genres: Indie rock, alternative rock
- Years active: 2002–present
- Labels: Polyvinyl
- Members: Mark Duplass; Craig Montoro; John Thomas Robinette, III
- Past members: Byron Westbrook
- Website: www.polyvinylrecords.com/artist/volcano_im_still_excited

Volcano, I'm Still Excited!! was an American indie rock band from Brooklyn, New York (originally from Austin, Texas). The band's name (which has been described as "ludicrous") was reportedly inspired by the Tom Hanks film Joe Versus the Volcano, though the band has never revealed the inspiration for the name.

== History ==
The band's beginnings can be traced back to 1998. At the time, Mark Duplass was touring the country in support of his solo debut, Small Hands. This earned him a record deal with Mercury Records. After another solo release, Duplass moved from Austin to New York City to pursue his music career. Shortly after arriving in New York, Duplass was diagnosed with tendinitis in both of his arms, and was told that playing the guitar would further aggravate his injury. Wanting to remain in music, Duplass enrolled in City College of New York to study composition. He turned to playing the organ as it was the only instrument which he was able to play pain-free.

Duplass returned to Texas in late 2002 to record songs he had written. This resulted in Volcano, I'm Still Excited!!'s debut EP, Carbon Copy. The Austin Chronicle favorably compared "The New Brad" from Carbon Copy to Rufus Wainwright. While touring to support this release, the band was noticed by Polyvinyl, who released the group's full-length eponymous debut.

The band drew inspiration from acts such as Elvis Costello, Guided By Voices, Death Cab For Cutie, Beulah and Wilco, according to Duplass.

== Other pursuits ==
In addition to their activities with Volcano, I'm Still Excited!!, the individual band members have collaborated with other artists. Craig Montoro contributed to Mates of State's 2003 release Team Boo as well as Sufjan Stevens's Illinois in 2005. Duplass has written, produced, and starred in many films such as Humpday and Cyrus and starred in the FX sitcom The League and Apple TV drama series, The Morning Show.
