= Wampire =

American indie rock band from Portland, Oregon

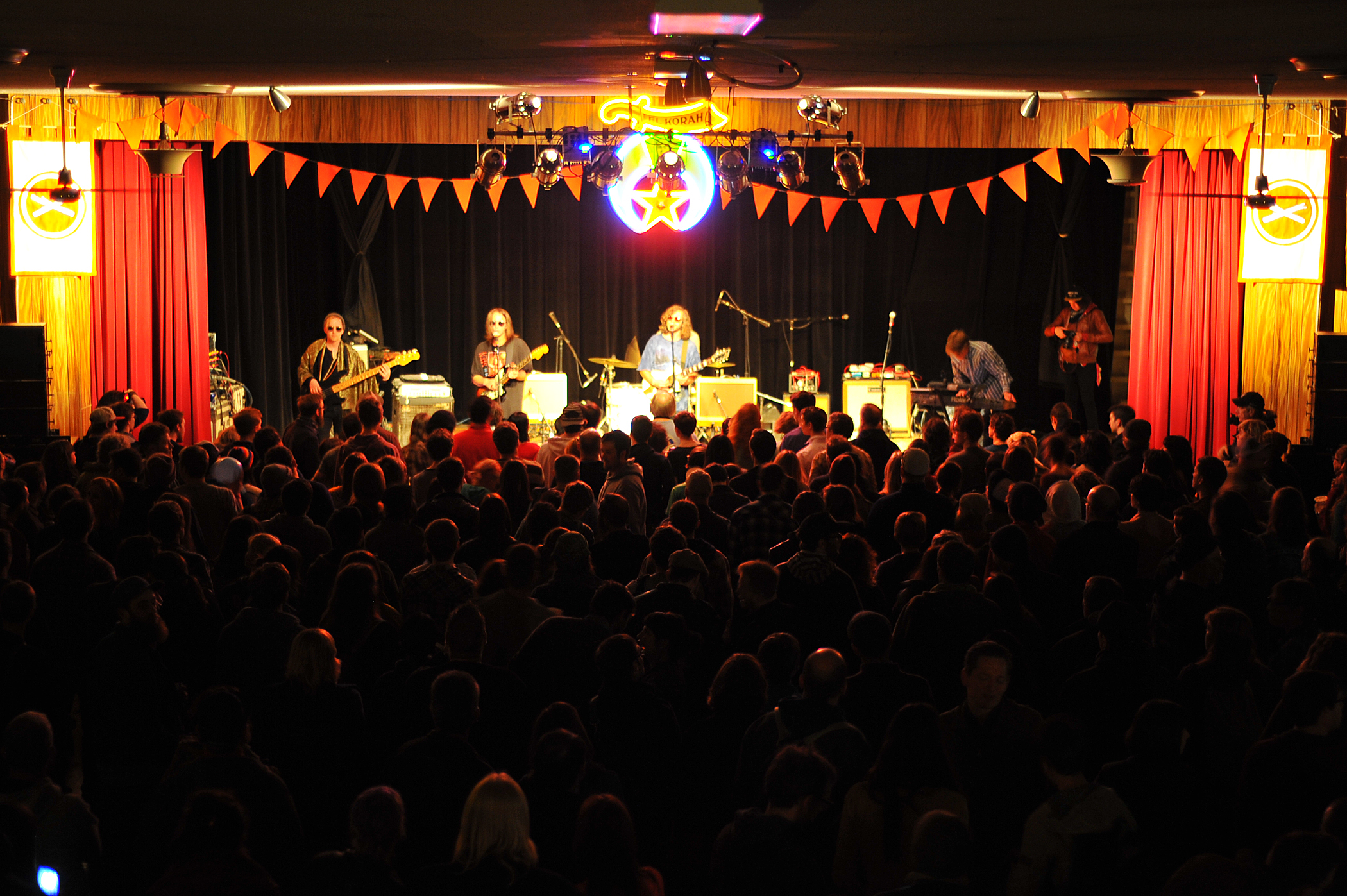

Background information
- Origin: Portland, Oregon, United States
- Genres: Indie rock, synthpop, psychedelic pop
- Years active: 2007–present
- Label: Polyvinyl
- Members: Eric Phipps; Rocky Tinder; Cole Browning; Owen Thompson; Thomas Hoganson

Wampire is an American indie rock band from Portland, Oregon, started by duo Rocky Tinder and Eric Phipps. The band has released 2 full-length albums on Polyvinyl Records; their debut album Curiosity (released on May 13, 2013) and the follow-up "Bazaar" (released on October 7, 2014).

== History ==
Wampire formed in 2007, though Phipps and Tinder had been playing together since 2001. The duo become well known in the Portland house show scene for their dance-oriented electronic music. After a shift in musical direction to create a more diversified sound, the band began recording their debut album Curiosity in late 2012. The album was produced by Jake Portrait from fellow Portland band Unknown Mortal Orchestra and released by Polyvinyl Records on May 13, 2013. The album was well received by critics, with positive reviews from Paste, Pitchfork, Allmusic, Consequence of Sound, and other outlets.

Following the release of their debut album Curiosity in 2013, Wampire went from a duo most accustomed to playing house parties around their hometown of Portland to a five-piece band performing in venues all over the world with groups such as Unknown Mortal Orchestra, Foxygen, and Smith Westerns.

During this 12-month period, Wampire performed at numerous venues across more cities, countries, and continents than in all their previous years combined. The demanding touring schedule provided the band members with a wide range of new experiences and opportunities, allowing them to dedicate more time and attention to their music than ever before.

As a result, when founding members and primary songwriters Rocky Tinder and Eric Phipps returned home at the tail end of the year, they immediately dove into the process of working on a new album in order to capitalize on the creative energy that had been steadily amassing during their days, weeks, and months on the road.

Says Phipps of that moment in time, "I holed up in a tiny room within a friend's warehouse and began knocking out as many different songs as I could. I tried not to look back, just wanting to explore everything I could possibly create. I started to feel like I was becoming a Kafka-esque insomniac musical novelist at one point."

As with their previous full-length Curiosity, Wampire recorded Bazaar with trusted producer Jacob Portrait (of Unknown Mortal Orchestra), though this time around the sessions took place at The Museum, a studio in Brooklyn's Greenpoint neighborhood, and were done directly to tape.

Far from home once again, Tinder and Phipps used the city to their advantage—writing lyrics on the 40-minute bus ride to and from their temporary residence in Bed-Stuy and rushing to a shop down the street to buy a guitar—one that looked and felt like it had been buried in dust for decades and had just the right analog sound—as their allotted studio time was winding down.

Another important change was the addition of touring drummer Thomas Hoganson to the recording and songwriting process. Though Tinder and Phipps had previously sought to minimize distractions in the studio by just working with each other, Hoganson's diverse musical abilities (in addition to drums, he also plays piano and saxophone on Bazaar) made him an ideal collaborator.

== Discography ==
=== Albums ===
- Curiosity (2013)
- Bazaar (2014)

=== Singles ===
- "The Hearse" (2013)
