= The Red Hot Valentines =

US power pop band

The Red Hot Valentines were a power pop band from Champaign, Illinois. They formed in 1999, with Jeff Johnson (lead vocals, guitar), Tobin Kirk (backing vocals, guitar), David Gerkin (backing vocals, bass), Eric Humbert (drums), and Jason Searby (keyboards). They released two full-length albums and three EPs. Jason Searby left the band in 2001 for college shortly after recording their first album, and was replaced by Tyson Markley of The Amazing Kill-O-Watts,(as well as MANDROID destroyers of the human race, Analog Saves the Planet, and Tyson & the Friction) who left the band in 2003 to raise his kids. The band went on without a keyboardist, and started to go in a new musical direction, as they were tired of playing the catchy pop that they had been known and loved for. By the end of 2004, they had broken up. Their last show was on November 20, 2004. Jeff Johnson and Tobin Kirk each got married and moved away from the band's central Illinois homeland. Eric has since gone on tour with Fall Out Boy as a drum tech and is currently playing with the band EndeverafteR.

== Releases ==
=== There Is No Plan B (EP) ===
The EP was self-released by the band in 2000, and is now out of print.

1. "Everything's Fine"
2. "Firecracker"
3. "My Girlfriend Has A Boyfriend"
4. "There Is No Plan B"
5. "One Last Dance"
6. "Qik-N-EZ Girl"
7. "mountain"

=== The Red Hot Valentines (album) ===
The Red Hot Valentines was the self-titled debut album by the band of the same name. It was originally self-released in early 2002, but was soon picked up by Double Zero Records. It is now out of print.

1. "I'm Sorry"
2. "Everything's Fine"
3. "Hit The Road"
4. "My Girlfriend Has A Boyfriend"
5. "Angela"
6. "Sincere"
7. "Linger Longer"
8. "Already Gone"
9. "There Is No Plan B"
10. "You Sang To Me"
11. "So Far Away"

=== The Red Hot Valentines/Retro Morning (Split EP) ===
This EP was released in 2002 by Double Zero Records. Tracks 1-3 are from The Red Hot Valentines, and tracks 4-6 are from Retro Morning.

1. "Bring Back The Good Times"
2. "You've Gotta Love"
3. "Better Than Last Time"
4. "Burning Song"
5. "There I Go"
6. "Monday Is A Lie"

=== Calling Off Today (EP) ===
The EP was released in January 2003 by Polyvinyl Record Co. to give listeners a taste of what was to come on their upcoming full-length release, Summer Fling (although only one track from this release, "Don't Bother" was actually on that album).

1. "Calling Off Today"
2. "Firecracker"
3. "Don't Bother"

=== Summer Fling (album) ===
Summer Fling was the second full-length album from The Red Hot Valentines. It was released in May 2003 on Polyvinyl Record Co.

1. "Wait For Summer"
2. "This Heart Of Mine"
3. "Pocket Full Of Secrets"
4. "Fair Warning"
5. "Wishful Thinking"
6. "I Want To"
7. "Christine"
8. "Don't Bother"
9. "All You Get"
10. "One Last Kiss"
