= The Like Young =

- Origin: Chicago, Illinois, United States
- Genres: Indie rock
- Years active: 2002–2006
- Past members: Amanda Ziemba; Joe Ziemba

The Like Young was an American indie rock band from Chicago, Illinois, composed of Amanda and Joe Ziemba. The couple had been playing music together since the 1990s in Wolfie, then Busytoby. They formed Like Young in the spring of 2002 and were married in the same year.

Amanda played the drums and Joe played the guitar, bass, and occasionally keyboard; both sang, though Joe—who wrote most of the songs—took the lead more often.

== Early releases ==
Later in 2002, they released their first album, a five-track EP entitled "Looked Up" Plus Four, with Kittridge Records. In the spring of 2003, they released their first full-length album, Art Contest, on Parasol Records to generally positive reviews.

Their next full-length album, So Serious, was released in the summer of 2004 on Parasol Records. Reviews for So Serious were more positive than for Art Contest, with some reviewers sharply contrasting the two. Tim Sendra of Allmusic wrote that "Art Contest was a slab of formulaic punk-pop bereft of inspiration and hooks...So Serious makes no radical changes but is about 100 percent better and less cute, more real."

== Last Secrets and breakup ==
Their final album, Last Secrets, was released in 2006 on both CD and vinyl by Polyvinyl Records.

On August 27, 2006, the Like Young announced their retirement citing the need to move on and make smart decisions. In the announcement, Joe mentioned that the decision was a happy one. Joe soon returned to music and released Love at 30 in 2008 as Beaujolais; this record addresses the end of the Ziembas' marriage. Joe relocated to Los Angeles after 2009's Admirations.

In June 2011, Joe released a collection of tracks written and recorded for the Like Young from 2002 to 2006. The release, titled "Fifteen Demos," was released via his Bandcamp page. Of the release, Joe wrote, "I'm saying goodbye to The Like Young. Only this time, I'm doing so with a hug and a smile."

== Discography ==
Albums

- Art Contest (2003)
- So Serious (2004)
- Last Secrets (2006)
- Fifteen Demos (2011)

EPs

- S.T. Monroe / The Like Young (split single) (2002)
- "Looked Up" Plus Four (2002)
- The Timid EP (2005)
- Six at Midnight (2005)
