= Grapetooth =

- Origin: Chicago, Illinois, U.S.
- Genres: New wave, indie rock, synth-pop
- Years active: 2015–present
- Label: Polyvinyl
- Members: Clay Frankel; Chris Bailoni

Grapetooth is a Chicago-based new wave-influenced duo. The project, which consists of Clay Frankel and Chris Bailoni, was started in 2015.

== Career ==
Twin Peaks member Clay Frankel and Chris Bailoni, also known as Chicago producer Home-sick, met in 2012 through mutual friends. Three years later in 2015, the two bonded over similar musical tastes while out a bar and made a resolution to create music together. Frankel and Bailoni stumbled into the group’s sound after writing their first single, “Trouble.” Calling the project Grapetooth as a reference to Frankel’s wine consumption, the duo began playing and gathering attention at wild-mannered shows in Chicago. Grapetooth shared their second single, “Violent” in May 2018 and they released their debut album "Grapetooth" on November 9, 2018 on Polyvinyl Records. On February 12, 2020 Grapetooth, alongside fellow Chicago-based Musician Lala Lala, released a pair of singles, "Fantasy Movie" b/w "Valentine", on Hardly Art Records.

== Musical style ==
Noisey describes their single “Violent” as an earworm where “synths bubble over a pulsing drum machine and a bouncy Cure-like guitar riff.” Frankel and Bailoni cite ‘80s Japanese new wave, Arthur Russell, and Spacemen 3 as major influences.

== Discography ==
Albums

- Grapetooth (2018)

Singles

- "Trouble" (2017)
- "Violent" (2018)
- "Infinite Source" (2022)
- "Shining" (2022)
