= Generationals =

American indie pop duo

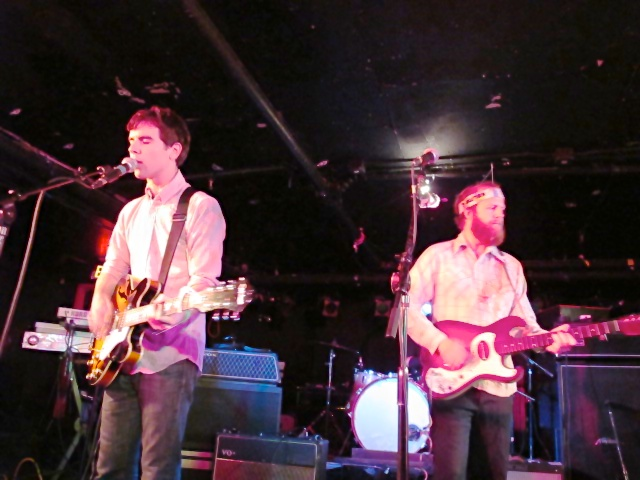
- Generationals perform at the Middle East Downstairs near Massachusetts Institute of Technology, Cambridge, Massachusetts, 2013

Background information
- Origin: New Orleans, Louisiana, U.S.
- Genres: Indie pop
- Years active: 2008–present
- Labels: Polyvinyl, Park the Van
- Members: Grant Widmer (vocals/guitars); Ted Joyner (vocals/guitars)
- Website: generationals.com

Generationals is an American indie pop duo formed in New Orleans. The duo, consisting of Ted Joyner and Grant Widmer, released their debut album, Con Law, in July 2009. An EP, Trust, came out in November 2010. Their second full-length album, Actor-Caster, was released on March 29, 2011. The band's third album, Heza, was released April 2, 2013 (their debut for Polyvinyl Records).

== Tours ==
Ted Joyner and Grant Widmer were co-founders of The Eames Era, an indie rock band from Baton Rouge, Louisiana whose song "Could Be Anything" was featured on the Grey's Anatomy soundtrack. The band broke up when three members decided they no longer wanted to pursue careers as musicians. The remaining members, Joyner and Widmer, formed a new band called the Generationals, so named because as they often watched CNN's coverage of the 2008 presidential election as they recorded, the pair noticed that nearly every issue was dubbed a generational issue.

Generationals released their debut album, Con Law, in July 2009 on the Park the Van label. Joyner and Widmer wrote the music and recorded the album with studio manager Dan Black. Mark Deming of AllMusic said the album's songs "are good enough to not suffer in comparison to the vintage acts they so clearly love, and that's why this debut is worthwhile, even if you're not nostalgic for the era of the sideways haircut." Andy Gensler of T: The New York Times Style Magazine called the album a "delectable debut" which "shimmers with the music of the British Invasion, Stax soul, Wall of Sound production, 1950s doo-wop and California-dreaming jangle filtered through a contemporary indie-rock lens." Spin's Jon Young said that although the duo's "cheery facade ultimately doesn't overcome the gnawing desperation, Con Law is good, neurotic fun." In a review of the band's song "When They Fight, They Fight," Zach Kelly of Pitchfork said of the band's style: "It comes as kind of a pleasant surprise to hear a band from N.O. sound this bright and enraptured in life's simple joys. But man, does this thing flirt with overdoing it."

"When They Fight, They Fight" was featured in a 2009 Bloomingdales Christmas commercial. Another song, "Faces in the Dark," was featured on a season 3 episode of the series Chuck. "Exterior Street Day" was featured in a television commercial for Reese's Peanut Butter Cups at the end of 2010. Non-album track "Either Way" was featured as the opening credit song during the 2010 comedy film Going the Distance. The pair have completed several tours covering much of the U.S., and have opened for bands including Broken Social Scene and Two Door Cinema Club.

Generationals released an extended play titled Trust in November 2010. The title track was featured as a "Pick of the Week" by Starbucks in January 2011. The track "When They Fight, They Fight" is in the Farrelly brothers movie Hall Pass in 2011 and also featured in a 2012 episode of Suits. The song was used for an advert for the Amazon Kindle in 2012 in the UK and Germany. The duo's second full-length album, Actor-Caster, was released in March 2011.

== Members ==
- Ted Joyner – vocals, guitars
- Grant Widmer - vocals, guitars

== Discography ==
=== Studio albums ===
List of albums, with selected details
Year	Album details
2009	Con Law: Release date: July 21, 2009; Label: Park the Van; Format: CD, LP, digital download
2011	Actor-Caster: Release date: March 29, 2011; Label: Park the Van; Format: CD, digital download
2013	Heza: Release date: April 2, 2013; Label: Polyvinyl; Format: CD, LP, cassette, digital download
2014	Alix: Release date: September 16, 2014; Label: Polyvinyl; Format: CD, LP, cassette, digital download
2018	State Dogs: Singles 2017–18: Release date: December 7, 2018; Label: Polyvinyl; Format: CD, LP, cassette, digital download
2019	Reader as Detective: Release date: July 19, 2019; Label: Polyvinyl; Format: CD, LP, cassette, digital download
2023	Heatherhead: Release date: June 2, 2023; Label: Polyvinyl; Format: CD, LP, digital download

=== Extended plays ===
List of extended plays, with selected details
Title	Album details
2010	Trust: Release date: November 16, 2010; Label: Park the Van; Format: CD, digital download
2012	Lucky Numbers: Release date: October 2, 2012; Label: self-released; Format: digital download
