= Cale Parks =

American drummer

Michael Cale Parks, otherwise known as Cale Parks, is best known for his role as the multi-faceted drummer, percussionist, pianist and vibraphonist of the indie band Aloha on Polyvinyl Records.

In the summer of 2006, Cale Parks released his first full-length album, Illuminated Manuscript, on Japan's Stiff Slack Records and in the US on Polyvinyl Records. The record was recorded on borrowed four-tracks and computers in various locations in the midwest.

In 2007–2008, Cale joined Brooklyn-based band White Williams as their drummer.

And at the end of 2009, BRAHMS, a three-man Coldwave band composed of Parks, Eric Lyle Lodwick and Drew Montag Robinson was formed. With only four demos under their belts, already critics named the band as one to look out for.

In addition to performing solo and with Aloha and White Williams, Cale Parks is also known for recording and touring with various other bands and solo artists, including: Cex, Chin Up Chin Up, Joan of Arc, Love of Everything, Owen, Pit Er Pat and Passion Pit. In the spring of 2012 Parks began playing with Yeasayer. In 2014 Cale toured as a drummer with Chet Faker and in 2015 on drums with Tanlines.

In 2013, Parks released a solo single, "N1", on the Brooklyn electronic label, Have A Killer Time (HAKT). The release also features a remix by French duo, Paradis.

Parks released a solo EP, Lagoon Fool, in the spring of 2015 on Have A Killer Time (HAKT). The vinyl release of Lagoon Fool features a title track remix by Bell Towers.

In October 2015, UK vinyl only label, Rothmans, released the Diego Maradonna 12" featuring two new tracks by Cale along with a remix by Berlin's Eddie C.

== Solo discography ==
=== Albums ===
- 2006: Illuminated Manuscript (Polyvinyl Records)
- 2008: Sparklace (Polyvinyl Records)

=== EPs ===
- 2009: To Swift Mars (Polyvinyl Records)
- 2015: Lagoon Fool (Have A Killer Time)
- 2015: The Diego Maradonna EP (Rothmans UK)

=== Singles ===
- 2013: N1 (Have A Killer Time)
