= Picastro =

Canadian slowcore and rock music band

- Origin: Toronto, Ontario, Canada
- Genres: Shoegazing, Folk rock, Dream pop
- Years active: 1998–present
- Label: Alien8
- Members: Liz Hysen, Nick Storring, Matthew Ramolo, Germaine Liu
- Past members: Brandon Valdivia, Evan Clarke, Rachel McBride, Owen Pallett, Stephanie Vittas, Kurt Newman, Alex McLeod, Zak Hanna

Picastro is a Canadian slowcore and rock music band based in Toronto, Ontario. The band is fronted by guitarist/vocalist Liz Hysen, and currently includes cellist Nick Storring, synth and guitarist Matthew Ramolo (Khora), and drummer Germaine Liu. Past members included Evan Clarke, Rachel McBride, Owen Pallett, Stephanie Vittas, Kurt Newman, Alex McLeod, and Zak Hanna.

== History ==
Picastro formed in 1998 in Toronto. In 2002, they released their debut album, Red Your Blues, with slow, heavy instrumental music overlaid with Hysen's vocal work. The band toured the U.S. and performed on WFMU as well as recorded a session for Daytrotter Session.

Red Your Blues was featured as "Album of the Week" in the London Sunday Times following its release on Monotreme and the band appeared on Gideon Coe's BBC 6 show. The song "Winter Notes" appeared on the television show 24.

Following this, Metal Cares was released on Polyvinyl Records and Monotreme and the band toured Europe several times, performing on VPRO and various festivals.

After releasing the album Whore Luck, Picastro performed at the X-Avant Festival in 2007. The song "Towtruck" was featured on the BBC and included on the Wire's, Wire Tapper, volume 13.

The band's 2009 album, Become Secret, featured mainly the lead singer Hysen; 2012's Fool, Redeemer was a collaboration between Hysen, Aidan Baker and Leah Buckareff. The band continued to tour Europe expanding into the Balkans, Eastern Europe, and the Baltics.

in 2014, Picastro released You, which contained more extensive contributions from the other band members. The band then went on a European tour.

== Discography ==
- Red Your Blues (2002)
- Metal Cares (2005)
- Whore Luck (2007)
- Become Secret (2009) (vinyl)
- Become Secret (2010) (CD)
- Fool, redeemer (2011) split with Nadja released on Alien8
- You (2014)
- Exit (2019)
