= Dusted (Canadian band) =

Canadian indie rock band

- Origin: Toronto, Ontario, Canada
- Genre: Indie Rock
- Years active: 2012–present
- Label: Hand Drawn Dracula
- Members: Brian Borcherdt; Leon Taheny
- Website: Official site

Dusted is a Canadian indie rock band, whose core members are Brian Borcherdt and Leon Taheny. Their music features Borchert's songs and vocals.

== History ==
Dusted began following the release of Brian Borcherdt's 2008 solo EP, Coyotes. With a new set of songs Brian began producing the album in Nova Scotia and then in Toronto, checking into a renovated garage studio with engineer Leon Taheny. The final album, still under Brian Borcherdt's name, was signed to Polyvinyl for international release. Months before the release date the project name changed to Dusted to give the album a fresh start, away from the singer/ songwriter world. Leon Taheny then joined on as a drummer/ bassist to support the album, touring with Perfume Genius and playing festivals like Osheaga and SXSW. Blackout Summer, the follow-up album, once again featured stripped back solo performances yet was mostly full-band arrangements, featuring Anna Edwards-Borcherdt, Anna Ruddick, Robbie Grunwald, Simone TB, and Loel Campbell.

Dusted's debut album Total Dust, was released on Hand Drawn Dracula on July 10, 2012. The album featured low-fidelity guitar and keyboard rock music overlaid combined with Borcherdt's lyrics. That year the band performed in support of the album at various clubs, including at the El Macombo in Toronto as part of the NXNE festival.

Six years later, in 2018, Dusted released a second album, Blackout Summer. The album features Borcherdt's vocals over electronic rock sounds of guitar, keyboard and bass. Borcherdt's wife Anna Edwards, as well as Anna Ruddick and drummer Loel Campbell, performed on the album.

In 2021, Dusted announced their third album, appropriately titled III. It was released on July 23, 2021, via AWAL.
