= Polyvinyl Record Co. =

American independent record label

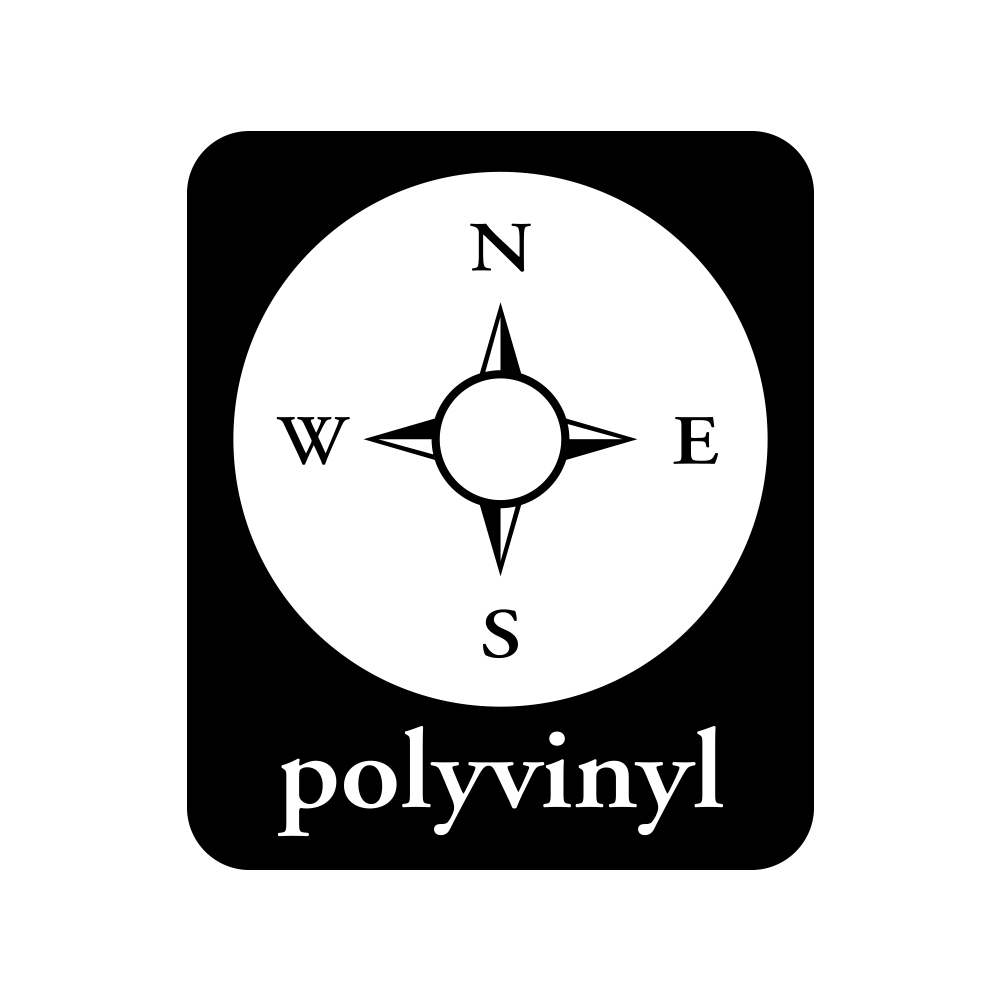
- Founded: 1996
- Founder: Matt Lunsford; Darcie Knight Lunsford
- Distributors: Merlin Network / FUGA (digital); AMPED (physical)
- Genre: Indie rock, indie pop, alternative rock
- Country of origin: U.S.
- Location: Champaign-Urbana, Illinois
- Official website: polyvinylrecords.com

Polyvinyl Record Co. is an American independent record label headquartered in Champaign, Illinois. Polyvinyl has put out over 400 releases to date.

== History ==
=== 1994–1999 ===
In 1994, high school students Matt Lunsford and Darcie Knight from Danville, Illinois east of Urbana and Champaign, founded Polyvinyl Press, a fanzine created to celebrate the Midwestern D.I.Y. scene. As part of Polyvinyl Press' third issue in July 1995, Lunsford and Knight released a split 7" featuring Back of Dave and Walker. With the fifth and final issue of Polyvinyl Press in May 1996, Lunsford and Knight put out an accompanying 20-track compilation, Direction, chronicling the state of mid-'90s Midwestern D.I.Y and marking the official transition of the fanzine to Polyvinyl Record Co. Lunsford and Knight established a 50/50 profit sharing model for the label.

Early releases like the debut album from the Direction-featured band Rainer Maria, Past Worn Searching, and Braid's 1998 album Frame and Canvas, set a national eye on Polyvinyl. The next year, Polyvinyl released American Football's self-titled debut. This record has grown to be one of the best-selling releases on the label and established a working relationship with Mike Kinsella, who later released albums including Owen, Joan of Arc, and Their / They're / There on Polyvinyl.

=== 2000–2009 ===
In 2001, Knight and Lunsford moved the label from Danville to Urbana-Champaign, IL to give Polyvinyl a better infrastructure to grow. Such growth led to the Polyvinyl 2003 Winter Tour, which commenced right after the January release of Rainer Maria's Long Knives Drawn. Rainer Maria and Mates of State went on the road with fellow labelmates Owen and Saturday Looks Good to Me. Later in 2003, Polyvinyl released the video of Rainer Maria's Winter Tour set at Chapel Hill's Cat's Cradle and Mates of State's third record, Team Boo. In 2004, Polyvinyl began to be distributed by Alternative Distribution Alliance and added Athens' of Montreal to the label family. of Montreal released their first album with Polyvinyl, Satanic Panic in the Attic, the same year.

Polyvinyl celebrated its 10th anniversary in 2006 with a concert featuring Headlights, of Montreal, Owen, and Someone Still Loves You Boris Yeltsin in Urbana. In 2007, Polyvinyl released Architecture in Helsinki's Places Like This and of Montreal's critically acclaimed Hissing Fauna, Are You The Destroyer?, the best-selling album in Polyvinyl history. Polyvinyl closed out the decade in 2009 with the release of Japandroids' debut full-length, Post-Nothing.

=== 2010–present ===
Polyvinyl's 2011 15th anniversary bash expanded on its previous anniversary show with a nine-band bill including Asobi Seksu, Braid, Deerhoof, Japandroids, Joan of Arc, Owen, Someone Still Loves You Boris Yeltsin, STRFKR, and Xiu Xiu. Polyvinyl moved into their 16th year with the release of Japandroids' Celebration Rock. In 2014, Polyvinyl released another best-seller, Alvvays' self-titled debut, and leading up to the label's 20th anniversary, Polyvinyl expanded to a bigger location in Champaign in Spring 2015. After the label's move, Beach Slang released their debut full-length that autumn.

In 2016, the label celebrated its 20th anniversary. To commemorate the occasion, Polyvinyl released a compilation titled Polyvinyl Plays Polyvinyl, on which twenty Polyvinyl artists covered songs by their labelmates. With the help of Girl Skateboards and artist Jesse LeDoux, Polyvinyl created a skateboard deck as a symbol of skate culture's influence on Matt Lunsford's musical discovery and the label's early identity development.

Sophomore records from White Reaper and Alvvays came out in 2017, The World's Best American Band and Antisocialites, respectively, as well as Jay Som's first proper record for Polyvinyl, Everybody Works. All three albums closed out the year with spots on several year-end publication lists, including Pitchfork, NPR, Stereogum, and Paste. At the beginning of 2018, Polyvinyl committed to donate 10% of mailorder revenue one Friday per month to deserving causes, especially organizations that strive to make progress in music communities. Donation recipients have included the Tegan and Sara Foundation, OurMusicMyBody, and Girls Rock! Champaign-Urbana.

In February 2018, Polyvinyl announced a partnership with Brooklyn-based independent label Double Double Whammy. Double Double Whammy, which started in 2011 as a project to release the founders' project, LVL UP, has a catalog which includes Mitski, Frankie Cosmos, Yowler, Ó, Hatchie, and Florist, among others. Through this partnership, Polyvinyl provides distribution, accounting, webstore fulfillment, and other shared services, while Double Double Whammy maintains creative autonomy. In May 2023, Polyvinyl announced that they would be purchasing Urbana's American Football house in collaboration with American Football, photographers Chris Strong and Atiba Jefferson, and Chicago's Open House Contemporary, with the goal of "preserving both the space and its unique legacy within the community that shaped its existence."

In June 2021, they also partnered with Austin, Texas label Keeled Scales. Polyvinyl purchased a 25% stake in the smaller label and took on their fulfillment and shipping requirements, while leaving them with creative control.

In December 2022, Polyvinyl moved its digital distribution to FUGA and Merlin Network, and signed with Downtown Neighbouring Rights.

In May 2022, Polyvinyl partnered with San Francisco label Father/Daughter Records, and bought an equity stake in the company. As with Double Double Whammy, Father/Daughter retained control over all creative decisions with Polyvinyl now handling direct-to-customer fulfillment.

== Current roster ==
- Alvvays
- American Football
- Anamanaguchi
- Antarctigo Vespucci
- Anna Burch
- Being Dead
- Diane Coffee
- The Dodos
- Dummy
- Chris Farren
- Jacco Gardner
- Generationals
- The Get Up Kids
- Grapetooth
- Hazel English
- IAN SWEET
- Julia Jacklin
- Jay Som
- Kero Kero Bonito
- Laura Jane Grace
- LIES
- Man on Man
- Oceanator
- of Montreal
- Owen
- Palehound
- Pedro the Lion
- Post Animal
- Jeff Rosenstock
- Shy Boys
- Squirrel Flower
- STRFKR
- Xiu Xiu
- Yumi Zouma

== Full roster ==
- 31Knots
- Aloha
- Alvvays
- AM/FM
- American Football
- Anamanaguchi
- Antarctigo Vespucci
- Architecture in Helsinki
- Asobi Seksu
- Ativin
- Audible
- Beach Slang
- Birthmark
- Braid
- Anna Burch
- Cale Parks
- Casiokids
- Collections of Colonies of Bees
- Corm
- Decibully
- Deerhoof
- Diane Coffee
- The Dodos
- Dusted
- FAN
- Chris Farren
- Faux Hoax
- Kaia Fischer
- Friction
- Jacco Gardner
- Generationals
- The Get Up Kids
- Grapetooth
- Hail Social
- Hazel English
- Headlights
- IAN SWEET
- Ida
- The Ivory Coast (band)
- Julia Jacklin
- James Husband
- Japandroids
- Jay Som
- Joan of Arc
- Justus Proffit & Jay Som
- Katy Goodman & Greta Morgan
- Kero Kero Bonito
- Kerosene 454
- La Sera
- Ladyhawke
- Laura Jane Grace
- LIES
- The Like Young
- Loney Dear
- Love Is All
- The M's
- Man on Man
- Mates of State
- Matt Pond PA
- Mister Heavenly
- Momma
- Oceanator
- of Montreal
- The One Up Downstairs
- Owen
- Owls
- Painted Palms
- Palehound
- Paris, Texas
- Cale Parks
- Pedro The Lion
- Pele
- Pet Symmetry
- Phantastic Ferniture
- Picastro
- Pillar Point
- Post Animal
- Psychic Twin
- Quiet Slang
- Radiation City
- Radio Flyer
- Rainer Maria
- The Red Hot Valentines
- The Rentals
- Jeff Rosenstock
- Saturday Looks Good To Me
- Shy Boys
- Someone Still Loves You Boris Yeltsin
- Sonny & The Sunsets
- Squirrel Flower
- Stagnant Pools
- STRFKR
- Sunday's Best
- Tancred
- Their / They're / There
- Fred Thomas
- Shugo Tokumaru
- Tu Fawning
- Vivian Girls
- Volcano, I'm Still Excited!!
- Wampire
- White Reaper
- xbxrx
- Xiu Xiu
- Yumi Zouma
- ZZZZ

== See also ==
- Polyvinyl Record Co. discography
- List of Polyvinyl Record Co. artists
