= Simple Machines discography =

Below is the discography of the now-defunct independent record label Simple Machines from Arlington, Virginia that lasted from 1990 to March 30, 1998.

== Discography ==
Title	Artist	Year	Cat. #
Kingdom of Mattresses	Choke	1990	0.5
Wedge	The Hated, Lungfish, Edsel, Geek	1990	1
Wheel	Juliana Luecking, Holy Rollers	1990	2
Three's Company	Geek, Seaweed, Superchunk	1990	2.33
Necklace of Heads	Lungfish		2.5
Pulley	Bricks, My New Boyfriend, Nation of Ulysses, Mommyheads	1991	3
Screw	Candy Machine, Jawbox, Geek, Velocity Girl	1991	4
Headringer	Tsunami	1991	4.5
Lever	Severin, Scrawl, Autoclave, Circus Lupus	1992	5
Inclined Plane	Tsunami, Superchunk, Rodan, Unrest	1993	6
Fortune Cookie Prize	The Cannanes, Velocity Girl, Leaky Chipmunk, Scrawl, Seaweed, Thurston, Kim and Epic, Geek, Love Child, Unrest, Superchunk, Fish and Roses, Whorl	1991	7
Triology	Grenadine	1992	8
Awestruck	Sugartime	1992	9
Neapolitan Metropolitan	Breadwinner, Coral, Burma Jam, Fudge, Tear Jerks, Candy Machine, Slack, False Face Society, Bratmobile, Late, Lilys, Whorl	1992	10
Chances Are	Tear Jerks	1992	11
Coming Into Beauty	Mommyheads	1992	12
Deep End	Tsunami	1993	13
Season's Greetings	Tsunami	1992	14
?			15
Diner	Tsunami	1993	16
Bloodsucker	Scrawl	1991	17
Matchbook	Tsunami	1994	18
The Machines 1990-1993	The Hated, Lungfish, Edsel, Geek, Juliana Luecking, Holy Rollers, Bricks, My New Boyfriend, Nation of Ulysses, Mommyheads, Candy Machine, Jawbox, Velocity Girl, Severin, Scrawl, Autoclave, Circus Lupus, Tsunami, Superchunk, Rodan, Unrest	1993	19
Velvet Hammer	Scrawl	1993	20
Your Mother Wants to Know	Scrawl	1993	21
Don't Forget the Halo	Grenadine	1993	22
Nopalitos	Grenadine	1994	23
Be Like That	Tsunami	1994	24
The Heart's Tremolo	Tsunami	1994	25
Working Holiday	Scrawl, Versus, Lungfish, The Tinklers, Codeine, The Cocktails, Eggs, Jonny Cohen, Bratmobile, Veronica Lake, My Dad Is Dead, Rastro, Lois, Nothing Painted Blue, Tsunami, Small Factory, Jawbox, Crackerbash, Crain, Grifters, Pitchblende, Swirlies, Superchunk, Caterpillar	1994	26
January	Scrawl, Versus	1994	26a
February	Lungfish, The Tinklers	1994	26b
March	Codeine, The Cocktails	1994	26c
April	Eggs, Jonny Cohen	1994	26d
May	Bratmobile, Veronica Lake	1994	26e
June	My Dad Is Dead, Rastro	1994	26f
July	Lois, Nothing Painted Blue	1994	26g
August	Tsunami, Small Factory	1994	26h
September	Jawbox, Crackerbash	1994	26i
October	Crain, Grifters	1994	26j
November	Pitchblende, Swirlies	1994	26k
December	Superchunk, Caterpillar	1994	26l
Frog/Wrestling Song	Danielle Howle	1994	27
A Bedroom Community	Franklin Bruno	1995	28
The Monsters of Rock	Tsunami, Rodan, Eggs	1995	29
Concrete Sky	Flower	1993	30
Christiansen	Grenadine	1994	31
?			32
World Tour & Other Destinations	Tsunami	1995	33
Stereo	Sea Saw	?	34
Tales of Brave Ida	Ida	1994	35
About to Burst	Danielle Howle	1996	36
New Wave Dream	The Raymond Brake	1995	37
Stalls	Liquorice	1995	38
It's Not Alright/Thank You	Ida	1995	39
Wait/Riot Kill	Secret Stars	1995	40
Piles of Dirty Winters	The Raymond Brake	1995	41
Salt Lick	Retsin	1995	42
?			43
Magnetophone	Sea Saw	?	44
Good Under Pressure	Scrawl	1995	45
Egg Fusion	Retsin	1996	46
I Know About You	Ida	1996	47
Distortion/Babies	Monorchid	1996	48
Let Them Eat	Monorchid	1997	49
Travel On, Rider	Scrawl (Elektra Records 61934)	1996	50
Ida/Beekeeper	Ida	1997	51
Poodle/Old City	Tsunami	1997	52
A Brilliant Mistake	Tsunami	1997	53
Ten Small Places	Ida	1997	54
Poor Dumb Bird	Ida	1997	55
Antidote	Jenny Toomey (Misra Records MSR 010)	2001	56
Tempting: Jenny Toomey Sings the Songs of Franklin Bruno	Jenny Toomey (Misra Records MSR 016)	2002	57

== Sources ==
SMR 1-6 (except 2.33, 2.5, and 4.5), 19

SMR 2.33, 2.5, 9, 11, 12, 30, 40

SMR 4.5, 13, 14, 16, 18, 24, 25, 29, 33, 52, 53

SMR 7

SMR 8, 22, 23, 31

SMR 10

SMR 17, 20, 21, 45

SMR 26/SMWH 1-14

SMR 27, 36

SMR 28

SMR 35, 39, 47, 51, 54, 55

SMR 37, 41

SMR 38

SMR 42, 46

SMR 48, 49
