= My Fair, My Dark =

EP by Ida
- Released: August 5, 2008
- Genres: Indie rock, Indie folk, Baroque pop, Acoustic, Dream pop
- Length: 23:56
- Label: Polyvinyl Records
- Producer: Warren Defever

Ida chronology
Lovers Prayers (2008)	My Fair, My Dark (2008)

My Fair, My Dark is Ida's second EP, released in 2008 on Polyvinyl Records. It features two original songs, a live version of "Late Blues" (from Heart Like a River), and four covers. Guest musicians include The Band's Levon Helm, Peter Schickele, Michael Hurley, and Tara Jane O'Neil. My Fair, My Dark's eponymous lead song was first issued on the CD accompanying the 2005 music issue of The Believer magazine.

== Reception ==
Professional ratings
Review scores
Source	Rating
Allmusic	3.5/5 stars
Crawdaddy!	(favorable)
JamBase	(favorable)

Reviewers highlighted the new song "Still Life" and the two on which Levon Helm participated, Dolly Parton's "The Pain of Loving You" and the live version of Ida's own "Late Blues" from one of Helm's Midnight Ramble concerts. "My Fair, My Dark" was included on a list of "150 of the saddest songs in the world" published in the Los Angeles Times' music blog.

== Track listing ==
All songs written by Ida, except as noted.

1. "My Fair, My Dark" – 3:15 written by David Schickele
2. "Don't Wreck It" – 3:48
3. "Road to Ruin" – 2:16 written by John Martyn
4. "The Pain of Loving You" – 2:49 written by Dolly Parton
5. "Late Blues (Live)" – 4:40
6. "Still Life" – 3:33
7. "Time Has Come" – 3:35 written by Anne Briggs

The vinyl release contains an additional cover, of Warren Defever's "Darkness Night".

== Personnel ==
Musicians

- Jean Cook – violin
- Levon Helm – mandolin on "The Pain of Loving You", drums on "Late Blues"
- Michael Hurley – viola on "The Pain of Loving You"
- Ruth Keating – drums, percussion, marimba, ukulele, shruti box
- Daniel Littleton – guitar, wurlitzer, piano, percussion, vocals
- Elizabeth Mitchell – harmonium, vocals
- Tara Jane ONeil – guitar on "The Pain of Loving You"
- Karla Schickele – wurlitzer, bass, vocals
- Peter Schickele – piano on "Late Blues"
- Lincoln Schleifer – bass on "Late Blues"
- Matt Sutton – pedal steel on "My Fair, My Dark"

Technical personnel

- Warren Defever and Ida – producers
- Justin Guip – engineering
- Sean Price – additional engineering
- Daniel Littleton – additional engineering
- Steve Fallone – mastering

Graphics

- Tara Jane ONeil – art
- Warren Defever – design
