= Ida (band) =

American indie rock band

- Ida performing live in 1997

Background information
- Origin: Brooklyn, New York City, U.S.
- Genres: Indie rock; indie folk; slowcore; baroque pop; emo; dream pop
- Years active: 1992–2010; 2023–present
- Labels: Polyvinyl; Simple Machines; Tiger Style; Numero Group
- Spinoff of: The Hated
- Members: Daniel Littleton; Elizabeth Mitchell; Michael Littleton; Karla Schickele; Jean Cook; Ruth Keating
- Website: talesofbraveida.com

Ida is an American indie rock band from New York City, formed in 1992. They are known for their three-part vocal harmonies which typically consist of sparse and minimal, often quiet arrangements, and their three singer-songwriter compositions. Widely recognized as a central act within the 1990s slowcore movement, Ida’s music draws inspiration from a variety of genres, including folk, punk, pop, world, R&B, and American roots music, while sometimes incorporating avant-garde and experimental aspects to their sound as well. AllMusic has also noted the presence of chamber pop elements in their musical style.

== History ==
The band began in 1991 when Daniel Littleton and Elizabeth Mitchell started recording and performing as a duo. After playing shows with double-bassist Rick Lassiter they recorded a 4-track cassette of their songs. Jenny Toomey, co-owner of Simple Machines Records heard it, and offered to release an album on her label. Between 1994 and 1997 Ida released three full-length albums and several seven inch singles with Simple Machines Records including split singles with The Secret Stars and Portastatic. Shortly after the release of their debut Tales of Brave Ida, Daniel's brother Michael "Miggy" Littleton joined the band as a drummer and multi-instrumentalist. Their second album, 1996's I Know About You received much critical acclaim from the independent music press. CMJ praised it as "subtle, gentle and picturesque", Alternative Press gave it five stars, their highest rating, Pitchfork wrote "…Incredible Stuff". Bassist and singer-songwriter Karla Schickele (Beekeeper) joined the band in late 1996.

Ida's touring earned them a devoted following of listeners, and the attention of both the press and major labels. Their performances with violinist Ida Pearle, cellist Elaine Ahn, and clarinetist Sue Havens gave them a distinct and complex "chamber pop" sound. They released two EPs in 1998, Losing True, and The Ida Retsin Family, before signing with Capitol Records. After a shake up at Capitol Records, Ida successfully got out of their contract and released 1999's Will You Find Me with Tigerstyle Records, an independent label. Will You Find Me received greater recognition than any previous Ida record and landed on year end "Best of.." lists in both Spin Magazine and The New York Times while receiving praise from The New Yorker and The Village Voice.

In 2005 Ida released Heart Like a River with Polyvinyl Record Co., their current record label. Violinist Jean Cook (Jon Langford, The Waco Brothers) joined the band at this time, followed by drummer Ruth Keating. The band relocated to Woodstock, New York and began recording at Levon Helm Studios, where they collaborated with Levon Helm and played several Midnight Rambles. This led to the release of Lovers Prayers in 2008, and 2009's My Fair, My Dark EP. Recorded simultaneously with Lovers Prayers, a collaboration with outsider folk legend Michael Hurley led to 2009's Ida Con Snock which was released on Gnomonsong, Devendra Banhart and Andy Cabic's label.

Ida's music has appeared on both the radio show and the Showtime series of This American Life. In 2008 they were featured on NPR's Bryant Park Project. They have toured, collaborated, or played shows with many bands and artists such as Low, His Name Is Alive, Levon Helm, Michael Hurley, Tara Jane O'Neil, Bernie Worrell, Rachel's, Karate, Retsin, Beekeeper, Mates of State, Elliott Smith, Bob Mould, Cat Power, Death Cab for Cutie, The Magnetic Fields, The Secret Stars, The Holmes Brothers, Broadcast, Mark Eitzel, Steve Malkmus and many others.

After more than 13 years on hiatus (since 2010) Ida briefly reformed in 2023 for Numero Group's 'Numero Twenty' show in Los Angeles. In 2025, the band rejoined Tsunami for a more extensive national tour, announced initially in September 2024.

== Other projects ==
Daniel Littleton was a member of Annapolis, Maryland hardcore punk band The Hated, and along with Jenny Toomey, was a member of Liquorice, whose album Listening Cap was released by 4AD in 1995. He has released one solo album on Last Affair Records, Nobody's Fault But Mine/Down By The Riverside. A duo album with Tara Jane O'Neil, Music for a Meteor Shower was released by Tiger Style in 2002. In 2006 New Salt was released, a CD of guitar-based free improvisation by a trio including Geoff Farina (Karate, Glorytellers), Littleton, and drummer Luther Gray (Ida, Tsunami, Joe Morris, Joe McPhee). In 2010 the trio added saxophonist Jim Hobbs, and released West on the Clean Feed label under the name of Lawnmower. Mountain Ocean Sun, a "free drone" music collective also released a CD on Home Normal in 2010 called Peace Conference. This recording featured Littleton, Jean Cook, Warn Defever (of His Name Is Alive), and Hitoko Sakei. Littleton has also appeared on recordings by His Name Is Alive, Ted Leo, and Tara Jane O'Neil. He accompanied Lester Chambers of The Chambers Brothers at the first Future of Music Conference in Washington DC in 2001. Littleton's music has been featured in the films of Angel Velasco Shaw, notably Umbilical Cord which was shown at The Guggenheim, and 2008's The Momentary Enemy.

Elizabeth Mitchell is a children's music artist who records for Smithsonian Folkways. Her album You Are My Little Bird was a critical success and led to her being featured on NPR's All Things Considered, where she was interviewed by Melissa Block. She also runs and owns Little Bird Records, which keeps her early independent children's music recordings in print. She has been featured on NPR's Talk of The Nation, The Bryant Park Project, and in Time Magazine. Elizabeth Mitchell's main collaborators are Daniel Littleton (her husband) and Warn Defever. She also performs with her daughter Storey Littleton and with violinist Jean Cook. She has collaborated with Levon Helm, John Sebastian, Jon Langford, Suni Paz, Ella Jenkins, Lisa Loeb, Dan Zanes, Amy Helm, and The Children of Agape Choir from South Africa. Her album Sunny Day was released in October 2010.

Mitchell has also appeared as a vocalist and instrumentalist on recordings by His Name Is Alive, Retsin, Tara Jane O'Neil, Sasha Frere-Jones with Tom Ze, The Sands, Ted Leo, and Saturday Looks Good To Me.

Mitchell and Littleton backed Lisa Loeb on her song "Stay (I Missed You)" which was a number-one hit in 1994 and appeared on the soundtrack for the film Reality Bites.

Mitchell and Littleton have performed and recorded under the name Nanang Tatang, an electro-pop duo. They released one album, Muki on TigerStyle records in 2003.

Michael Littleton left the band in 1999 and played with Tara Jane O'Neil, The Mad Scene, and Lois Maffeo before became a founding member of New York City bands White Magic and Blood on the Wall. White Magic's debut album Through The Sun Door was released on Drag City, and Blood on the Wall released three full-length albums, Blood on the Wall, Awesomer, and Liferz, all on The Social Registry label.

Karla Schickele was a founding member of the band Beekeeper from New York City, along with her brother, guitarist and composer Matthew Schickele, and drummer Jan Kotik. They released the album Ostrich on Southern Records in 1999. Karla also records under the name k. and released two albums New Problems (2001) and Goldfish (2002), both on TigerStyle Records. A third k. album entitled History Grows was released in 2012. She also released a split single with Ted Leo and The Pharmacists. She played keyboards with the band Low when they toured Europe with Radiohead in 2004. Schickele is the founder of Brooklyn's Willie Mae Rock and Roll Camp for Girls. She is the daughter of American classical music composer Peter Schickele.

Violinist Ida Pearle has performed and recorded with The Magnetic Fields, appearing on their 69 Love Songs album. She has also played with Ted Leo and The Pharmacists, and appears on the Hearts Of Oak album. She has recorded and performed with Low, His Name Is Alive, and many others. She designed the art for many albums by artists like Ida, Ruby Falls, Ted Leo, and Elizabeth Mitchell, as well as the book cover art for "The Latest Winter" by poet Maggie Nelson. Ida Pearle is a children's book author and illustrator.

Jean Cook, violinist for Ida, also performs with Jon Langford, The Mekons, The Waco Brothers, Elizabeth Mitchell, His Name Is Alive, the Art Ensemble of Chicago, and Mountain Ocean Sun. She is a founding member of Anti-Social Music and has performed with improvisers such as Cecil Taylor, Anthony Braxton, William Parker, Evan Parker and indie rock bands like Belle And Sebastian, Pulp and The Hold Steady. Since 2008 she has been the director of Future of Music Coalition.

Ruth Keating drummer and multi instrumentalist, along with Karla Schickele, is a founding member of The Willie Mae Rock and Roll Camp For Girls. Along with guitarist and frequent Ida collaborator Matt Sutton, she plays in NYC's Malarkies and The Naysayer.

== Discography ==
=== Studio albums ===
- Tales of Brave Ida (1994)
- I Know About You (1996)
- Ten Small Paces (1997)
- Will You Find Me (2000)
- The Braille Night (2001)
- Shhh... (2002)
- Heart Like a River (2005)
- Lovers Prayers (2008)

=== Live albums ===
- Insound Tour Support Series Vol. 11 (2000)
- Angel Hall (2003; recorded in 2000)
- The Bottom of the Hill (2-CD set, 2005)

=== With Retsin ===
- The Ida Retsin Family: Volume One (1998)

=== Singles/EPs ===
- Losing True (1998), EP
- "Shhh" (2002), Single
- My Fair, My Dark (2008), EP

=== Compilations ===
- Who Were You Then (2008)
- Tellings: The Simple Machine Years 1994–1997 (2008)
- Tales of Brave Ida (CD accompanying book, 2008)

=== Compilation appearances ===
- A Tribute to Bob Dylan, Vol. 3 – The Times They Are A Changin', (Sister Ruby Records, 1998) "Boot of Spanish Leather"
- Random Acts of Radio (Random Records, 1998), "Walk Away Renee"
- This Is Next Year: A Brooklyn-Based Compilation (Arena Rock Recording, 2001), "Hearts Don't Break" (Disc 2, Track 7)
- In My Living Room (Kimchee Records, 2003), "Losing True"
- Amos House Collection (Vol. II), "Jubilee"
- Never Kept a Diary (Motorcoat Records, 1998)

=== Book with CD ===
- Tales of Brave Ida (2008)
