= The Heart's Tremolo =

Studio album by Tsunami
- Released: 1994
- Recorded: October 1993
- Genre: Indie rock
- Length: 45:55
- Label: Simple Machines
- Producer: Tsunami

Tsunami chronology
Deep End (1993)	The Heart's Tremolo (1994)	World Tour & Other Destinations (1995)

The Heart's Tremolo is the second album by the American alternative rock band Tsunami, released in 1994. The band supported the album with a North American tour.

== Production ==
The album was recorded in the midst of a tour in fall 1993 at Electrical Audio studio in Chicago, Illinois. It was engineered and produced by Brian Paulson. Guitarist/vocalist Kristin Thomson said the album's production process taught them they "could also be very quiet," in addition to the louder music they were initially known for. "We were coloring outside the lines in both directions."

== Critical reception ==
Professional ratings
Review scores
Source	Rating
AllMusic	4.5/5 stars

AllMusic compared The Heart's Tremolo favorably to Tsunami's previous album, Deep End, noting that the songs "are more polished, complex, and accomplished than those of their debut."

Trouser Press wrote that "the band explores artful pop terrain that is alternately lushly balladic and quirky in an almost avant-folk manner."

The Washington Post determined that "since Tsunami is better at texture than riffs or tunes, most of the songs offer few counterpoints to the basic dirge. It's a relief when the guitar briefly perks up on the title song, or when [Jenny] Toomey's and [Kristin] Thomson's voices assert themselves on the album's most outgoing track, 'Be Like That.'"

The Guardian concluded that "such wryly intelligent lyrics deserve a more dynamic setting."

In 1997, Nashville Scene remarked negatively that The Heart's Tremolo "was sunk by the junior-high-loser love poetry that Toomey crooned."

== Track listing ==
1. "Loud Is as Loud Does"
2. "Quietnova"
3. "Be Like That"
4. "Fast Food Medicine"
5. "Kidding on the Square"
6. "Slaw"
7. "Cowed by the Bla Bla"
8. "The Heart's Tremolo"
9. "Le Bride d'Elegance"
10. "Fits and Starts"
