= Will You Find Me =

Studio album by Ida
- Released: July 11, 2000
- Genres: Indie rock, Indie folk, Baroque pop, Acoustic, Dream pop
- Label: Tiger Style Records
- Producers: Ida, Trina Shoemaker, Warren Defever, Tony Lash

Ida chronology
Ten Small Paces (1997)	Will You Find Me (2000)	The Braille Night (2001)

Will You Find Me is the fifth studio album by American indie rock band Ida, released in 2000 on Tiger Style Records. In 2025, The Numero Group announced an expanded 4xLP edition boxset with liner notes and 89 bonus tracks including outtakes, demos and covers.

== Reception ==
Professional ratings
Review scores
Source	Rating
Allmusic	4/5 stars
CMJ New Music Monthly	(favorable)
Entertainment Weekly	(A)
Pitchfork	(5.9/10)
Spin	(favorable)
The Village Voice	(favorable)
The Washington Post	(favorable)

Will You Find Me was reviewed as "Album of the Week" in The New York Times, where Jon Pareles described the songs as being "like the whispers of uncertain lovers in a perpetual dance of vulnerability and assurance, parting and reconciliation." According to Eric Weisbard (writing in The Village Voice) "they've inflated everything that was irritating about them—and made their first memorable album.

== Track listing ==
No.	Title	Length
1.	"Down on Your Back"	4:21
2.	"Maybelle"	6:45
3.	"This Water"	3:36
4.	"Shrug"	5:18
5.	"The Radiator"	2:04
6.	"Shotgun"	4:31
7.	"Turn Me On"	5:21
8.	"Man in Mind"	3:43
9.	"Past the Past"	4:37
10.	"Georgia"	3:10
11.	"Triptych"	3:13
12.	"Firefly"	2:39
13.	"Encantada"	3:36
14.	"Don't Get Sad"	4:27

== Personnel ==
Musicians

- Daniel Littleton – vocals, guitar, piano, wurlitzer, c3, silvertone organ, wineglass
- Elizabeth Mitchell – vocals, guitar, wurlitzer, mimbal
- Karla Schickele – vocals, bass, piano, organ, wineglass
- Michael Littleton – drums, percussion, melodica, accordion, wineglass
- Ida Pearle – violin
- Rick Lassiter – double bass
- Cecilia Littleton – viola, violin
- Sue Havens – accordion, clarinet
- Tim Thomas – piano
- Tara Jane ONeil – melodica
- Cynthia Nelson – harmonica
- Bernie Worrell – wurlitzer, moog synthesizer
- Elaine Ahn – cello
- Rose Thomson – plastic hose, piano
- Eddie Gormley – percussion
- Hanna Fox – percussion
- Andrew Hall – double bass
- Warn Defever – dictaphone, wire recorder, salt packet

Technical

- Greg Calbi – mastering
- Pat Graham – photography
- Stacy Wakefield – layout
