= Jerry Busher =

American drummer

Jerry Busher is an American drummer and multi-instrumentalist. He is known for his work with Fidelity Jones, Fugazi and Scream.

== Career ==
Jerry Busher is a musician, audio engineer and artist from the Washington DC area.

He played drums in Fidelity Jones from spring 1988 to spring 1990, touring the US and Canada. Fidelity Jones released Piltdown Lad E.P in 1989 and Venus On Lovely single in 1990 and are featured on the 20 Years Of Dischord and State Of The Union compilations.

Busher played drums with the Washington, DC rock group Elevator in 1992, which also featured John Hammill (Pussy Galore, Velvet Monkeys) and Malcolm Riviera (Gumball, Velvet Monkeys).

He formed Allscars in 1996 an "experimental" band that played improvised as well as structured music. Allscars released 3 full-length recordings ( early/ambient, Introduction to Humanity and Lunar Magus) toured the US, Canada, Europe and Japan. Busher played drums, trumpet samples/effects and painted the cover art.

In 1997 Busher began playing in The Spinanes with Rebecca Gates playing on the record Arches and Aisles, released on September 23, 1998. The album features guest spots and co-production by John McEntire and vocals by Sam Prekop.

Busher served as roadie for Fugazi in the 1990s, and began providing drums, percussion and trumpet to their live performances. His drums and percussion work is featured on the Fugazi releases The Argument and Furniture.

Busher can also be heard on multiple live recordings on the Fugazi Live Archive.

In 2001 Busher met guitarist John Frusciante when Frusciante attended several west coast Fugazi shows. He asked Busher to play drums for his DC EP, a four-song record tracked at Inner Ear Studios in Washington, DC and produced by Ian MacKaye.

In 2001, Busher formed French Toast with James Canty, another multi-instrumentalist and veteran of the Washington, DC music scene. The two (along with Ben Gilligan, since 2005) switch instruments and roles depending on the needs of each song. French Toast released 2 full-length albums In A Cave and Ingleside Terrace on Dischord Records. French Toast toured the US, Canada, and Europe as a headliner as well as opening for bands such as Sleater Kinney, Modest Mouse, Wilco and The Red Hot Chili Peppers.

In 2008, Busher played dates with Funk Ark, a DC funk band with a horn section as well as singers Federico Aubele and Alfonso Velez.

In October 2013, Busher joined the Washington, DC–based glam/progressive-rock band Deathfix, replacing Devin Ocampo as drummer.

In 2016 Busher released a solo EP Bowl In A China Shop on Bandcamp.

== Solo discography ==
- Bowl In A China Shop, Bandcamp
  - Jerry Busher: Vocals, Guitar, Bass, Drums, Electronics, Ukulele, Trumpet

== Credits ==
- Fidelity Jones – Drums
  - State Of The Union Compilation, Dischord Records
  - Piltdown Lad, Dischord Records;
  - Venus On Lovely, Dischord Records
  - Magdeburg Lad, Dischord Records
- Chris Bald 96 – Drums
  - The Pre-Moon Syndrome Post Summer (Of Noise) Celebration Week!, recorded live at D.C. Space In Washington, D.C. during September 11-16, 1989, Sun Dog Propaganda Label
- Las Mordidas – Drums, Artwork
  - Surrounded b/w K.I.T.A, Compulsiv
  - Mukilteo Fairies/Las Mordidas split single, Honey Bear Records
  - WGNS Gots No Station Compilation, Echoes Of The Nation’s Capitol Compilation
  - Ex-Voto LP, L.G. Records LG-6 2023
- Allscars – Drums, Electronics, Trumpet, Artwork, Audio Engineer
  - Allscars (self-titled single), 1996, Ace Fu Records
  - early/ambient, 1997, Slowdime Records
  - Introduction To Humanity, 1999, Slowdime Records
  - Troubleman Mix (tape Compilation), 2001, Troubleman Unlimited
  - Stretching Jupiter (single), 2001, DotLineCircle (Japanese release)
- Holy Rollers – Drums
  - Vehicle compilation single, 1995, Shute Records
- The Spinanes – Drums
  - Arches And Aisles, 1998, Sub Pop
  - All Sold Out (single), 1999, Sub Pop
- Brendan Canty and Jerry Busher – Drums, Guitar, Trumpet
  - Mebranaphonics compilation, 2001, Monitor Records
- French Toast – Drums, Vocals, Bass, Guitar, Artwork, Audio engineer
  - Bugman EP, 2002, Arrest Records
  - Hatred Mace/For Sylvia (single), 2003, Arrest Records
  - Radio CPR:Begin Live Transmission (compilation), 2003, Dischord Records
  - One Bright sunny Morning (compilation), 2005, Iseler Communication Recordings
  - In A Cave, 2005, Dischord Records
  - SPEX CD #50 (compilation), 2005, SPEX
  - Ingleside Terrace, 2006, Dischord Records
- Blonde Redhead – Trumpet
  - Symphony Of Treble/Kasuality (single), 1997, Touch And Go Records
- Fugazi – Drums, Percussion, Trumpet, Photographer (End Hits)
  - The Argument, 2001, Dischord Records
  - Furniture (single), 2001, Dischord Records
  - Fugazi Live Series, miscellaneous live concert recordings from 1998-2002, Dischord Records
- Beauty Pill – Trumpet
  - The Cigarette Girl From The Future, 2001, DeSoto Records
- Orthrelm – Audio Engineer
  - Orthrelm/Touchdown split release, 2002, Troubleman Unlimited
- Ted Leo and the Pharmacists – Audio Engineer
  - Bridges, Squares (single), 2002, Tiger Style Records
- Dead Meadow – Audio Engineer
  - Shivering King And Others, 2003, Matador Records
- Lida Husik –, Audio Engineer
  - Mad Flavor, 1999, Alias
  - Nuclear Soul, 2006, Digital single
- Mascott – Drums, Percussion
  - Electric poems, 1998, Le Grand Magistery
  - Follow The Sound, 2000, Le Grand Magistery
- The Evens – Trumpet
  - The Odds, 2012, Dischord Records.
- Alfonso Vélez – Drums, Percussion
  - The Weather, 2011, DJ Boy Records
  - Alfonso Vélez, 2012, Orbital Records
- John Frusciante – Drums, percussion
  - DC EP, 2004, Record Collection
- Joe Lally – Drums
  - There To Here, 2006, Dischord Records
- Natalia Clavier – Drums
  - Live At The Triple Door, 2009, ESL Music
- Federico Aubele – Drums
  - Berlin 13, 2011, ESL
- Sunwolf – Drums, Percussion, Producer, Audio Engineer
  - Angel Eyes, 2014, El Rey Records
  - Follow The Dreamers, 2017, El Rey Records
- Struck, Original Cast Recording featuring Alan Cumming – Drums, 2019, Broadway records
- Scream – Drums, Percussion
  - "D.C. Special" 2023, Dischord Records
  - Misc. live shows 2023/24
- Shadow Riot – Drums, Percussion, Audio Engineer/Mixer
  - "Quiet Please" 2025, Timo Records
  - Misc Bandcamp releases
