= Venus Zine =

American magazine

- Editor-in-chief: Jill Russell
- Frequency: Quarterly
- Circulation: 90,000 (2010)
- Publisher: Anne Hartnett; Marci Sepulveda
- Founder: Amy Schroeder
- Founded: 1995
- Final issue Number: Fall 2010; 44
- Country: USA
- Based in: Chicago
- Website: venuszine.com (defunct)

Venus Zine was a quarterly internationally circulated magazine covering women in music, film, art, entertainment, literature, fashion, indie culture and DIY culture. It was published from 1995 through 2010.

Venuszine.com was the daily updated online companion to the magazine. Venus Zine and venuszine.com featured interviews with artists including Yoko Ono, Patti Smith, and Kim Deal in addition to edgy and up-and-coming musicians, designers, writers, actresses, and DIY entrepreneurs.

== History ==
Venus Zine, headquartered in Chicago, Illinois, was founded in East Lansing, Michigan, in the Michigan State University dorm room of Amy Schroeder in 1995. It began as a photocopied, black and white, stapled fanzine but over the years grew into a full-size glossy publication. In 2006, it was bought by two magazine publishers, Anne Hartnett and Marci Sepulveda, who also publish Chicago Agent magazine. The magazine covered music, fashion, and culture. The readership is both male and female, but most articles are written by women.

In April 2010, the magazine was relaunched under new ownership of Sarah Beardsley who acquired the publication in February. In December 2010, the publication ended its print run and laid off all staff members.

== Articles of note ==
In response to a 2003 article by Rolling Stone titled "The 100 Greatest Guitarists of All Time", which included only two female guitarists, Venus Zine published their own "Greatest Female Guitarists Of All Time" list. Put together through nominations by experts Abigail Aronson Zocher, Kenneth Bays, Calvin Johnson, Evelyn McDonnell, Amy Phillips, Jaan Uhelszki, and Nan Warshaw, the list features the 46 women deemed worthy of being called the greatest including: Joan Jett, Odetta, Carrie Brownstein, Memphis Minnie and Chrissie Hynde.

The list has been mentioned and discussed by such web publications as Chicagoist and Gaper's Block.

== Past issues ==
2010	Winter	45	Janelle Monáe
2010	Fall	44	Zoe Kravitz
2010	Summer	43	Jack White
2010	Spring	42	Melissa Auf der Maur
2009	Fall	41	Cobie Smulders
2009	Summer	40	Ximena Sarinana
2009	Spring	39	Evan Rachel Wood
2008	Winter	38	She & Him
2008	Fall	37	Kid Sister
2008	Summer	36	Missy Elliott
2008	Spring	35	Juliette Lewis
2007	Winter	34	Dita Von Teese
2007	Fall	33	M.I.A.
2007	Summer	32	Björk
2007	Spring	31	Feist
2006	Winter	30	Cat Power
2006	Fall	29	Anna Sui
2006	Summer	28	Amy Sedaris
2006	Spring	27	Neko Case
2005	Winter	26	Lady Sovereign
2005	Fall	25	Ana Gasteyer
2005	Summer	24	Sleater-Kinney
2005	Spring	23	Sarah Silverman
2004	Winter	22	Joanna Newsom
2004	Fall	21	Le Tigre
2004	Summer	20	Janeane Garofalo
2004	Spring	19	The Von Bondies
2003	Winter	18	Natasha Lyonne
2003	Fall	17	Peaches
2003	Summer	16	Liz Phair
2003	Spring	15	Cat Power
2002	Winter	14	Aimee Mann
2002	Summer/Fall	13	Sleater-Kinney
2002	Spring	12	Tanya Donelly
2001	Winter	11	Le Tigre
2001	Fall	10	Quasi
2001	Summer	9	The Butchies
2000	Fall	8	Mascott
2000	Summer	7	Sleater-Kinney
2000	Spring	6	Cibo Matto

== Press ==
- In 2007, Venus Zine was named one of the Chicago Tribune's "50 Favorite Magazines."
