= The Braille Night =

Studio album by Ida
- Released: June 5, 2001
- Recorded: Winter 1998 – Winter 2000
- Genre: Indie rock, indie folk, Baroque pop, acoustic, dream pop
- Label: Tiger Style Records
- Producer: Warn Defever, Trina Shoemaker, Ida

Ida chronology
Will You Find Me (2000)	The Braille Night (2001)	Heart Like a River (2005)

Professional ratings
Review scores
Source	Rating
AllMusic	4/5 stars
Metro Times	(favorable)
Pitchfork Media	(5.0/10)

The Braille Night is the fifth studio album by American indie rock duo Ida, released in 2001 on Tiger Style Records.

== Track listing ==
1. "Let's Go Walking" (D. Littleton/Mitchell/Schickele/M. Littleton) – 3:59
2. "Ignatia Amara" (Littleton) – 2:44
3. "Arrowheads" (Karla Schickele) – 3:57
4. "So Long" (Littleton/Fisher) – 5:46
5. "Blizzard of '78" (Littleton) – 7:19
6. "So Worn Out" (Littleton) – 2:33
7. "The Braille Night" (Pearle/Littleton) – 2:04
8. "Gladiolas" (Mitchell/Littleton) – 5:44
9. "Ocean of Glass" (Littleton) – 4:05
10. "Moves Through the Air" (Littleton) – 9:13

== Personnel ==
Musicians

- Elizabeth Mitchell – vocals, guitar, wurlitzer, thumb piano, piano
- Daniel Littleton – vocals, guitar, melodica, organ, piano
- Karla Schickele – vocals, bass, thumb piano, piano
- Ida Pearle – violin
- Michael Littleton – drums, guitar
- Rick Lassiter – upright bass
- Zach Wallace – upright bass
- Luther Gray – drums, percussion

Technical Personnel

- Warn Defever – recording and mixing
- Trina Shoemaker – recording and mixing
- Steve Fallon – mixing

Graphics

- Ida Pearle – artwork
- Erin Courtney – lettering
- Rebecca Jane Gleason – photography
- Nick Pimentel – layout
