= Holy Rollers (band) =

American punk band

- Origin: Washington, D.C.
- Genres: Punk rock, post-hardcore, alternative rock
- Years active: 1988-1995, 2025-present
- Labels: Dischord Records, Adult Swim Records, Shred of Dignity
- Members: Joe Aronstamn; Marc Lambiotte; Graham McCulloch; Ed Trask
- Past members: Max Micozzi; Chris Maynard Bopst; Dana Wachs; Jerry Busher
- Website: https://dischord.com/band/holy-rollers

Holy Rollers was an American punk band that formed in 1988 in Washington, D.C. The band initially was composed of guitarist/vocalist Marc Lambiotte, bassist/vocalist Joe Aronstamn, and drummer/vocalist Max Micozzi (then known as Maria Jones). Band members alternated lead vocals and Holy Rollers were the first D.C. punk band to incorporate three-part harmonies. Music historians and authors Mark Andersen and Mark Jenkins described the band's sound as "kinetic punk-funk" with "passionate, message-driven songs." Holy Rollers were a part of new trend in post-hardcore artistic diversity that developed within the D.C. punk scene of the late 1980s and early 1990s. They released three albums on Dischord Records, an American punk label that Noisey described as "one of the most respected and revered [record labels], punk or otherwise, in the world." As AllMusic declared, "[w]ithout being an arena act or coming off with the aggrandizing air of one, the Holy Rollers still make big music that can inspire and go beyond simple post-hardcore approaches."

== History ==
Aronstamn and Lambiotte had previously collaborated in the D.C. punk band Grand Mal, which was active from 1983 through 1985, releasing the album Binge Purge on Fountain of Youth Records in 1985. The pair eventually started a new band, auditioning several drummers before meeting Micozzi and starting Holy Rollers. Micozzi suggested the name for the new band, inspired by the way minister and activist Malcolm X used the term in his autobiography. Holy Rollers debuted on March 24, 1989, opening a Fugazi, Swiz, and Edsel show at the Wilson Center, a former church in the Mount Pleasant neighborhood of Washington D.C.

Following their debut concert, Holy Rollers performed throughout 1989 with groups like Jawbox, Fidelity Jones, and Shudder to Think. Also that year, the band's debut EP, Origami Sessions, was released on Dischord Records and Adult Swim Records, the latter a then-new record label by Dischord co-founder, Jeff Nelson. Around this time, Holy Rollers frequently collaborated with poet Juliana Luecking on performances and recordings.

The group's debut album, As Is, was released by Dischord in 1990. It was co-produced by the band with Geoff Turner of Gray Matter. Aronstamn later remarked that As Is “didn’t capture our live sound" and "the basic tracks just didn’t have the power I felt.” The Washington Post described one of the band's performances at a 1990 benefit concert organized by the Positive Force DC punk activist group as "jamming with meaning [...] It's amazing. [...] The awesome and unutterable power of it!" In a favorable review of As Is, Trouser Press observed that Holy Rollers "display a remarkable range of musical knowledge that adequately supplements their limited musical abilities."

Mark Jenkins' review of As Is in The Washington Post observed that "both song titles such as 'Freedom Asking' and the trio's hortatory style illustrate the Holy Rollers' kinship with Fugazi. Yet the Rollers' As Is [...] sometimes goes its own way -- whether with the explicit politics of "Ode to Sabine County" (about a black prisoner beaten to death in a Texas jail) or the agit-folk singalong of "Johnny Greed" (which starts like the Weavers and ends up like Sonic Youth). Though As Is is often more likable more for what it intends than what it achieves, such songs as "Machine" are worthy additions to the Dischord canon."

Fabuley was released in 1991 and was co-produced by Ian MacKaye (of Fugazi and Minor Threat) and Don Zientara. The Washington Post described Fabuley as "questing and unsatisfied, as always, and a little more tuneful and produced than in the past," before praising the group's vocals and "layered harmonies." Noisey's retrospective review of Fabuley remarked that, "[w]ith their three-part vocal harmonies, strident politics and more experimental approach to songs, Holy Rollers were perhaps one of the more overlooked bands on Dischord."

Following the release of Fabuley, Micozzi left Holy Rollers and moved to San Francisco, joining the influential queercore band Tribe 8.

Micozzi was replaced by Ed Trask, a drummer from Richmond, Virginia. Trask's friend Chris Maynard Bopst joined the band shortly after as a bassist and Aronstamn shifted to second guitar. The group's eponymous third album was released by Dischord in 1993 and was described by The Washington Post as "a testament to post-hardcore-punk's ability to open itself up without losing its original intensity." In a critical review, Trouser Press remarked that the "material and craftsmanship are strong" on Holy Rollers, "but the band seems to have narrowed its vision, opting to stick with tried and true D.C. rock variations while cutting back on the vocal intricacy and the thematic diversity of individual songs." The Washington City Paper gave Holy Rollers a favorable review, calling the album "something of a new beginning" and noting the band "have a new versatility and show themselves unafraid to use it."

Trask and Bopst departed the band by the end of 1994, replaced by bassist Dana Wachs and drummer Jerry Busher. Holy Rollers disbanded in 1995 after six years of performing and releasing music.

During its existence, the group played numerous benefit concerts for various charities and causes, such as the D.C. branch of ACT UP, the American Friends Service Committee, the Washington Peace Center, the Whitman-Walker Clinic, and others. Most of the benefit concerts the band took part in were organized by Positive Force DC, with Micozzi noting in a 1989 interview that Holy Rollers "like to work hand in hand with them completely. They've helped us a lot with our first shows. Big shows where they gave us a chance to be involved. It's a community."

Holy Rollers reunited in 2025 to perform at Positive Force DC's 40th anniversary festival at St. Stephen's Church in Washington, D.C. The reunion continued into 2026, with a July concert announced at the Black Cat in Washington, D.C. The reunion lineup included Aronstamn, Lambiotte, Trask, and bassist Graham McCulloch (formerly of Negative Approach).

== Discography ==
Holy Rollers released three studio albums, one EP, and made numerous compilation appearances.

Studio albums

- As Is (1990, Dischord)
- Fabuley (1991, Dischord)
- Holy Rollers (1993, Dischord)

EPs and singles

- Origami Sessions (1989, Dischord/Adult Swim Records)
- Cringer / Holy Rollers split (1991, Shred of Dignity Records)
- Watching the Grass Grow / Toy (1993, Dischord)
