= I Know About You =

Studio album by Ida
- Released: June 6, 1996
- Genre: Indie rock, slowcore, indie folk, baroque pop, acoustic, dream pop
- Label: Simple Machines

Ida chronology
Tales of Brave Ida (1994)	I Know About You (1996)	Ten Small Paces (1997)

I Know About You is the second studio album by American indie rock duo Ida, released in 1996 on Simple Machines Records.

== Reception ==
Professional ratings
Review scores
Source	Rating
AllMusic	4.5/5 stars
CMJ New Music Monthly	(favorable)

"Subtle, gentle and picturesque...consistently memorable" – CMJ New Music Report
"gentle, understated but fully inhabited" – Trouser Press
"sparse and beautifully produced" – Roll Magazine
"I...played it practically daily for...several months." – PopMatters
"the best Ida album" – The Village Voice
"No one has harmonies as beautiful as Ida. The voices of Liz (Mitchell) and Dan (Littleton) are the prettiest in all the land." – The Chicago Tribune

== Track listing ==
All songs written by Ida, except "When I Was Now" by Cindy Kallet, originally from her album Cindy Kallet 2.

1. "Little Things" – 4:20
2. "Back Burner" – 4:52
3. "Tellings" – 4:26
4. "Thank You" – 4:34
5. "Downtown" – 4:44
6. "Treasure Chest" – 5:36
7. "Requator" – 4:35
8. "When I Was Now" – 3:15
9. "August Again" – 4:41
10. "Plans" – 4:58
11. "95 North" – 4:46
12. "Goodnight" – 3:33

== Personnel ==
- Elizabeth Mitchell - vocals, guitar
- Daniel Littleton - vocals, guitar, piano
- Michael Littleton - drums
- Rose Thomson - bass
- Rick Lassister - stand up bass, string arrangements
- Cecilia Littleton Bonner - viola, violin
