= A Brilliant Mistake =

Studio album by Tsunami
- Released: September 23, 1997
- Recorded: April 1997
- Genre: Rock
- Length: 47:28
- Label: Simple Machines
- Producer: Tsunami; Dave Trumfio

Tsunami chronology
World Tour & Other Destinations (1995)	A Brilliant Mistake (1997)

Professional ratings
Review scores
Source	Rating
AllMusic	3.5/5 stars
The Encyclopedia of Popular Music	3/5 stars
MusicHound Rock: The Essential Album Guide	3.5/5 stars

A Brilliant Mistake is the third full-length album by American alternative rock band Tsunami, released in 1997. It was the band's last album.

== Production ==
The album was recorded in Chicago. Members of The Sea and Cake, the Coctails, and the Pulsars contributed instrumentation to the album.

== Critical reception ==
The Washington Post wrote that "Tsunami still doesn't compose outgoing melodies, but the band's control of mood and texture has become formidable." CMJ New Music Monthly called the album "heady and beautiful," and praised Jenny Toomey's "rich, liquid voice." Nashville Scene called the album the band's best, writing that "the instrumentation on A Brilliant Mistake is a remarkable achievement—an absorption of some of the prettier sounds of the 'post-rock' movement while retaining a fundamentally aggro-punk edge." The Courier-Journal wrote that "Tsunami hasn't forgotten how to write challenging pop songs, and Toomey's voice remains one of indie rock's most beautiful instruments."

== Track listing ==
1. "Old Grey Mare"
2. "Great Mimes"
3. "Double Shift"
4. "Enter Misguided"
5. "The Workers Are Punished"
6. "Liar's Dice (Flight of the Chickens)"
7. "The Match"
8. "Poodle"
9. "Unbridled"
10. "DMFH"
11. "David Foster Wallace"
12. "Hockey"
13. "PBS"
