= Ten Small Paces =

Studio album by Ida
- Released: September 30, 1997
- Genre: Indie rock, Indie folk, Baroque pop, Acoustic, Dream pop
- Label: Simple Machines

Ida chronology
I Know About You (1996)	Ten Small Paces (1997)	Will You Find Me (2000)

Professional ratings
Review scores
Source	Rating
AllMusic	4.5/5 stars
The A.V. Club	(favorable)
CMJ New Music Report	(favorable)
Trouser Press	(favorable)

Ten Small Paces is the third studio album by the American indie rock duo Ida, released in 1997 on Simple Machines Records.

== Track listing ==
All tracks are written by Ida, except as noted.

No.	Title	Length
1.	"Hilot"	3:16
2.	"Les Étoiles Secrètes"	2:29
3.	"Fallen Arrow" (Karla Schickele)	3:39
4.	"The Weight"	3:13
5.	"Everybody Knows This Is Nowhere" (Neil Young, from Everybody Knows This Is Nowhere)	2:00
6.	"Blue Moon of Kentucky" (Bill Monroe)	1:07
7.	"Shoe-In" (Secret Stars)	3:17
8.	"Poor Dumb Bird" (Karla Schickele)	2:45
9.	"Golden Hours" (Brian Eno, from Another Green World)	4:32
10.	"Ashokan Reservoir"	1:11
11.	"Drunk Aviator"	2:09
12.	"Do You Remember"	3:24
13.	"Purely Coincidental"	2:59
14.	"Dream Date"	4:06
15.	"Capo"	3:03

== Personnel ==
Ida

- Daniel Littleton – guitar, piano, vocals, dobro, violin, capo
- Elizabeth Mitchell – guitar, piano, vocals, bass
- Karla Schickele – bass, vocals, acoustic guitar
- Michael Littleton – drums, vocals, casio

Additional musicians

- Elaine Ahn – cello on "Hilot"
- Chris Rael – theremin on "Les Étoiles Secrètes"
- Steven Immerwahr – bass on "Blue Moon of Kentucky"
- Ida Pearle – violin on "Ashokan Reservoir" and "Drunk Aviator"

Technical personnel

- Rebecca Jane Gleason – front cover photograph
- Pat Graham – band photos
- Kristin Thomson – layout
- Charlie Pilzer – mastering
