= World Tour & Other Destinations =

Compilation album by Tsunami
- Released: 1995
- Recorded: 1991–1997
- Genre: Rock
- Length: 70:00
- Label: Simple Machines
- Producer: Tsunami

Tsunami chronology
The Heart's Tremolo (1994)	World Tour & Other Destinations (1995)	A Brilliant Mistake (1997)

World Tour & Other Destinations is the third full-length album by American alternative rock band Tsunami. A compilation album, it is a collection of hard-to-find singles, b-sides and compilation tracks from 1991-1997.

== Track listing ==
1. "Flameproof Suit"
2. "World Tour"
3. "Ski Trip"
4. "Kickball Babe"
5. "Candyman"
6. "Genius Of Crack"
7. "Answerman"
8. "Left Behind"
9. "Punk Means Cuddle"
10. "Could Have Been Christmas"
11. "Load Hog"
12. "Goldigger" [sic]
13. "Beauty Pt. II"
14. "Brick Book Building"
15. "Sometimes A Notion"
16. "Walking Tour"
17. "Crackers"
18. "Not Living"
19. "Bossa Nova"
20. "Kidding On The Square"
21. "Newspaper"
22. "Courage"
