= Chez Viking =

Studio album by The Mercury Program
- Released: November 24, 2009
- Genre: Post-rock
- Length: 31:50
- Label: Lovitt Records

The Mercury Program chronology
A Data Learn the Language (2002)	Chez Viking (2009)

Chez Viking is the fourth studio album by American post-rock band The Mercury Program, released in 2009 on Lovitt Records; seven years after their previous album A Data Learn the Language.

== Track listing ==
No.	Title	Length
1.	"Chez Viking"	4:47
2.	"Arrived/Departed"	4:45
3.	"Backseat Blackout"	4:20
4.	"Katos"	6:23
5.	"Stand & Sing"	2:33
6.	"The Church of Cause and Effect"	4:20
7.	"Fluorescent Laces"	4:42
Total length:		31:50
