= Ruby Falls (band) =

New York City-based math rock band

- Origin: New York City
- Genres: Math rock
- Years active: 1992–2000
- Past members: Andrew Bordwin; Cynthia Nelson; Letha Rodman; Jennifer Rogers; Laura Rogers

Ruby Falls was a New York City-based math rock band active from 1992 to 2000. Later in their history, the band consisted of entirely female musicians, leading M.R. Newmark of PopMatters to describe them as "the only all-female math-rock band of any significance".

== History ==
Ruby Falls was formed in 1992. The band's founding members were lead vocalist and bass guitarist Cynthia Nelson, vocalists and guitarists Jennifer Rogers and Letha Rodman, and drummer Andrew Bordwin. In 1994, Bordwin left the band and was replaced by Rogers' sister, Laura. In the same year, Nelson was featured in the film Half-Cocked, and Ruby Falls contributed the song "Dusty" to its soundtrack. Later in 1994, Nelson took a hiatus from Ruby Falls, which continued playing without her until she rejoined the band in 1996. Later that year, the band released the EP What She Does, followed shortly thereafter by their full-length debut, Heroines. Nelson then took another hiatus from Ruby Falls to focus on two other bands of which she was then a member: Retsin and the Naysayer. In 2000, she rejoined Ruby Falls and they released their second and final album, For the New Crop, on Heartcore Records.

== Discography ==
- What She Does (Personal Favorite EP, 1996)
- Heroines (Silver Girl, 1996)
- For the New Crop (Heartcore, 2000)
