= Lovers Prayers =

Studio album by Ida
- Released: January 29, 2008
- Label: Tiger Style
- Producers: Warren Defever; Ida

Ida chronology
Heart Like a River (2005)	Lovers Prayers (2008)

Lovers Prayers is the seventh studio album by American indie rock band Ida, released on January 29, 2008, by Tiger Style Records. It has been reviewed by AllMusic, Pitchfork, Magnet Magazine, and PopMatters. Band members Mitchell and Littleton performed songs from the album on the NPR newsmagazine show Bryant Park Project.

== Track listing ==
All tracks are written by Daniel Littleton, except as noted.

No.	Title	Length
1.	"Lovers Prayers"	5:12
2.	"The Weight of the Straw"	3:48
3.	"The Love Below"	5:04
4.	"Willow Tree"	4:16
5.	"Worried Mind Blues"	4:09
6.	"Gravity" (Karla Schickele)	4:39
7.	"For Shame of Doing Wrong" (Richard Thompson, originally from Pour Down Like Silver)	3:16
8.	"First Light"	5:07
9.	"Kora"	5:01
10.	"Surely Gone"	4:43
11.	"The Killers 1964"	5:18
12.	"See the Stars"	3:52
13.	"First Take"	4:36
14.	"Blue Clouds"	3:30

== Personnel ==
Musicians

- Jean Cook – violin
- Levon Helm – drums on "First Light"
- Michael Hurley – wurlitzer on "Worried Mind", viola on "Blue Clouds"
- Ruth Keating – drums, percussion, glockenspiel, melodica, shruti box
- Daniel Littleton – guitar, percussion, piano, harmonium, viola
- Elizabeth Mitchell – guitar, harmonium, wurlitzer
- Tara Jane ONeil – guitar, drums
- Jane Scarpantoni – cello
- Karla Schickele – bass, wurlitzer, tambourine, piano
- Matt Sutton – guitar, pedal steel guitar

Technical personnel

- Warren Defever – producer, engineer, mixing
- Justin Guip – engineer, mixing
- Sean Price – engineer
- Daniel Littleton – engineer
- Greg Calbi – mastering
- Tara Jane ONeil – art
- Silver Mountain Media – design
