= Evanston Township High School =

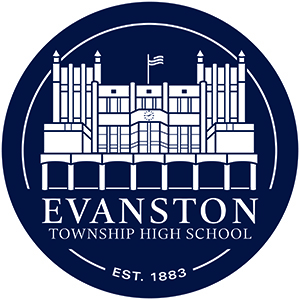

Location
- 1600 Dodge Avenue; Evanston, Cook County, Illinois 60201; United States; 42.0463°N 87.70075°W

Information
- School type: Public
- Established: August 31, 1883; 143 years ago
- School district: Evanston Township High School District 202
- Superintendent: Marcus Campbell
- CEEB code: 141860
- Principal: Quiana McNeal
- Teaching staff: 293.70 (on an FTE basis)
- Grades: 9–12
- Enrollment: 3,560 (2024–2025)
- Student to teacher ratio: 12.12
- Campus: Suburban
- Campus size: 65 acres (260,000 m^{2})
- Colors: Orange (PMS 1665); Blue (PMS 289)
- Slogan: "It's a great day to be a Wildkit!"
- Fight song: ETHS Fight Song
- Athletics conference: Central Suburban League
- Mascot: Willie the Wildkit
- Nickname: Wildkits
- National ranking: 933
- SAT average: 1067
- Newspaper: "Evanstonian"
- Yearbook: Key
- Feeder Schools: Nichols, King Arts, Bessie Rhodes, Haven, Chute
- Website: www.eths202.org

Evanston Township High School (ETHS) (District 202) is a public high school in Evanston, Illinois. The campus is located in a northern suburb of Chicago along the Lake Michigan shore. ETHS was established in 1883 and serves the city of Evanston and a small portion of the neighboring village of Skokie for a total district population of approximately 78,000.

The attendance area of the school is home to Northwestern University. Evanston Township High School has 589 certified staff members. ETHS is fully accredited by the State of Illinois.

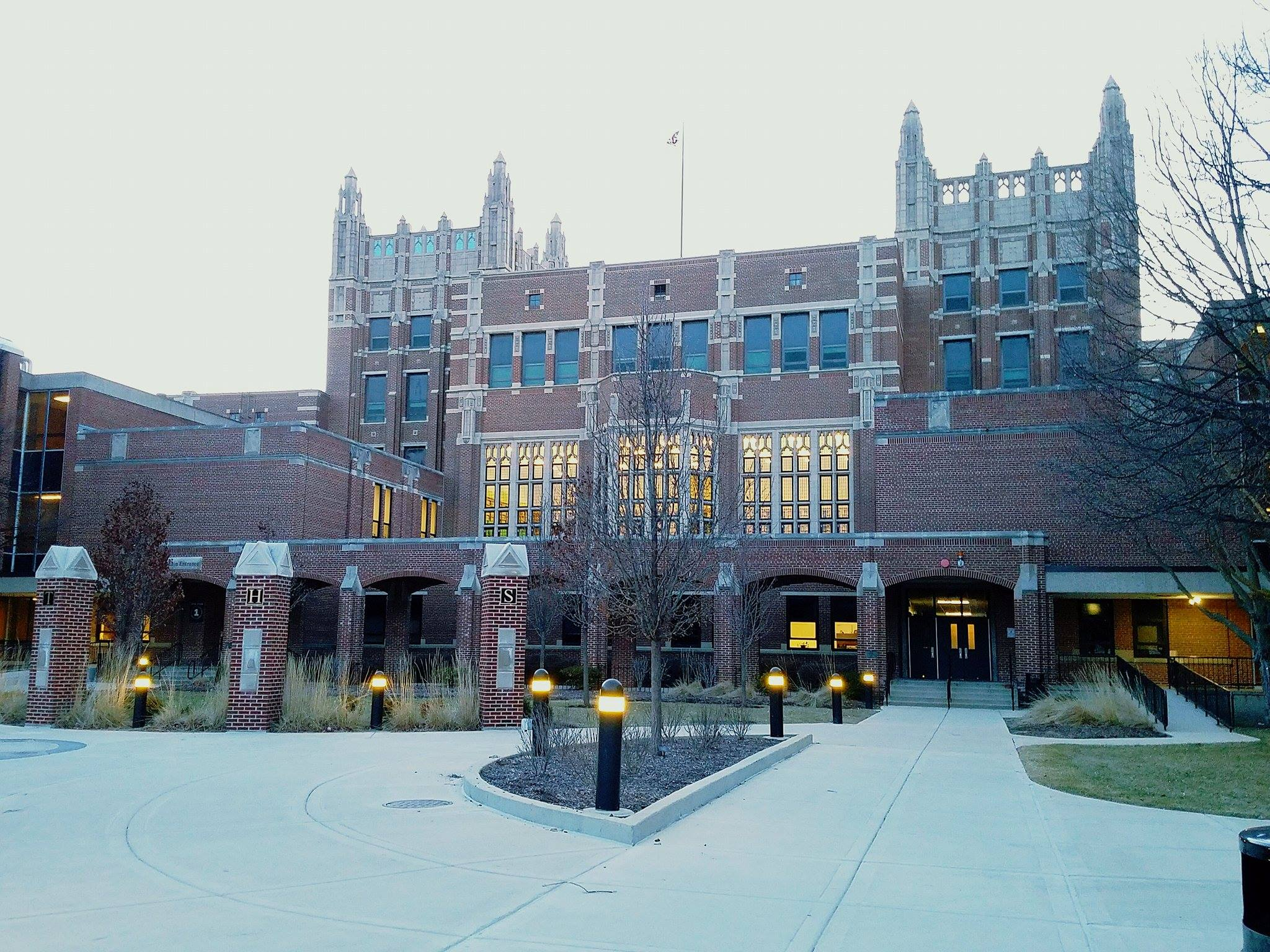
Evanston Township High School's iconic "castle-like" structure and main entrance, as viewed from Dodge Avenue.

== History ==
The first high school in Evanston, the Preparatory School of Northwestern University, established in 1857, was a private institute. In 1873, public school superintendent Otis E. Haven began teaching Evanston's first public high school class in an upper room of the Benson Avenue School. In 1875, Evanston's first Board of Education voted to establish a "high school" in the room, and the first class, consisting of two students, graduated in 1876. Enrollments grew rapidly and, despite multiple relocations to various buildings, by 1882 the school took four prizes in a statewide competition and was ranked third best in Illinois. Shortly thereafter, voters in April 1882, passed a referendum and bond issue establishing a township school. Construction began promptly in October 1882, and the first building opened in 1883, at Dempster and Elmwood.

Enrollment grew rapidly and by 1913, despite multiple additions to the original building, 740 students occupied space meant for only 600. Crowding increased as several attempts to pass bond issues for further addition were defeated at the polls. In 1915, the Board determined to build a new school at a new location, but progress was stalled for years by a bitter fight over the campus location, which included lawsuits that went all the way to the Illinois Supreme Court. Finally, in 1921, the Board and voters approved a 55-acre (220,000 m^{2}) site at the school's current campus, 1600 Dodge Avenue in central Evanston. Construction began in 1923, and the school opened in 1924.

With a campus currently listed as 65 acres (263,000 m²), ETHS provides its students with many technically proficient facilities. With more than 1.2 million square feet indoors, it is often claimed to be the largest high school facility under one roof in the United States, although this claim is uncertain. The school's science facilities include a planetarium, greenhouse, and a two-acre (8,000 m²), on-site nature center/classroom. The South Technology Center (STC), formerly the Bacon Computer Center, houses over 200 computers in seven networked labs. Computer software is available for many courses in the curriculum and the STC is open to students and classes during all school hours. Near the school, across Dodge Ave. on the corner of Davis St., is the Edible Acre urban farming project, initiated by The Talking Farm, which is run with the help of ETHS volunteers during the growing season.

Students investigate careers in computer-based SMART Labs. An on-site day-care center serves as a lab for child-study classes. Career and Technical Education offers courses that prepare students for future career possibilities. Classes include Child Development, Business Management, Culinary Arts, where students work hands on with food, and learn how to prepare it in a safe and sanitary way, and Auto-Tech, where students run an auto-repair lab and learn engineering applications in computer-aided design, lasers and robotics using state-of-the-art equipment. Music students have their own computer lab with MIDI-enabled equipment.

The school's library, which is networked to all Illinois libraries, has a 90,000-volume collection and extensive audiovisual resources. Performance facilities include a 1,400-seat auditorium, two additional theaters, and a cable TV broadcasting studio.

There are 12 gyms including a dance studio and fitness/wellness center, two swimming pools, and a field-house with an indoor track and tennis courts. Outdoor facilities include a FieldTurf stadium, outdoor track, four baseball/softball diamonds, 7 athletic fields and 11 tennis courts.

In 2023, the school received media attention after it began offering AP math classes which were "restricted to students who identify as Latinx" or Black. The school later clarified that the classes were "intended to support" students of color and were open to students of all races.

== Student body ==
Diversity of the ETHS student body (2023-2024).
1. American Indian (0.30%)
2. Asian (4.50%)
3. Black/African American (24.1%)
4. Hispanic/Latino (20.2%)
5. Native Hawaiian (0.10%)
6. Two or more races (6.40%)
7. White (44.4%)

Evanston Township High School is a co-ed Title I public school with a diverse student body, both racially and economically. From official data in 2013-14, there were 2,959 students enrolled. Of these students, 1,100 were eligible for free lunch, and 91 for reduced lunch.

The school reported that the 2015-16 school year reflected "the highest enrollment number (3,322) over the last five years at ETHS. ETHS also recorded its highest enrollment of students who identify as Hispanic/Latino in the history of the school. The proportion of Black/African American students (29.5% in 2015-16) has remained steady at ETHS for the past five years while the proportion of Hispanic/Latino students at the main campus has increased from the prior year (about 18% in 2015-2016 compared to 17% in 2014-2015). The proportion of White students decreased to 43.6% in 2015-16 compared to 44.7% in 2014-2015. Additionally, the percentage of Asian students at the main campus has increased slightly in 2015-16 to 5.2% and the percentage of students identified as two or more races declined in 2015-16 to 3.3%, compared to 4.2% in 2014-15." ETHS also provides a transitional program for refugees from around the world.

== Academics ==
Some classes, including most required freshman courses, are taught at a mixed level, allowing all students to earn honors credit, while others are differentiated between regular, honors, and advanced levels. The school offers 36 courses for Advanced Placement credit, as well as 6 nationally recognized Project Lead the Way (PLTW) engineering courses. Students who have exhausted all of the available accelerated courses in an academic area at ETHS may take advanced courses for college credit at Northwestern University through a special scholarship program. Some years Northwestern faculty teaches advanced mathematics students at ETHS. ETHS is listed as a gold medal school under U.S. News & World Report's 2016 list of America's 500 Best High Schools, at #452 nationally and #13 in the state.

Ninety-seven percent of the students from the Class of 2024 took the state-administered SAT. ETHS students continue to score higher than the national average.

== Athletics ==
Evanston Township High School is the only high school in the U.S. to claim a Wildkit as its mascot. "Wildkits" is a reference to Northwestern University's Willie the Wildcat, a mascot that was adopted by the university in the 1920s. Evanston Township High School's Willie the Wildkit mascot appears to have originated during the 1946-47 academic year.

ETHS is a member of the Central Suburban League, and participates in state championship tournaments sponsored by the Illinois High School Association (IHSA). ETHS has 35 IHSA State Championships.

Each year, more than 1,000 students participate on 100 sports team in 31 different sports in basketball, bowling, cross country, golf, gymnastics, soccer, swimming & diving, tennis, track & field, volleyball, water polo, fencing, baseball, football, wrestling, badminton, cheerleading, lacrosse, softball,.

While not sponsored by the IHSA, ETHS also sponsors a team for boys in lacrosse. Both boys and girls may also compete as a member of the pom pom team (Pomkits).

The following sports teams have won their respective IHSA sponsored state championship tournament:

- Badminton (girls): 1991–92
- Basketball (boys):1967–68
- Cross Country (boys): 1953–54, 1966–67
- Gymnastics (boys):| 1962–63, 1964–65, 1966–67
- Soccer (girls): 2001–02
- Swimming & Diving (boys): 1952–53, 1953–54, 1954–55, 1955–56, 1959–60, 2000–01, 2004–05
- Tennis (boys): 1943–44, 1959–60, 1960–61, 1961–62, 1969–70
- Track & Field (boys): 1921–22, 1964–65, 1965–66, 1969–70, 1970–71, 1971–72, 1973–74, 1978–79
- Track & Field (girls): 1990–91, 1996–97, 1997–98, 2002–03, 2003–04, 2004–05, 2005–06

As of 2009, the Evanston boys swimming team has 53 top ten finishes in the state finals; the second highest number of top ten finishes in state history. The boys track & field team, similarly, has 47 top ten finishes, the second highest number of any team in the state. The 25 top ten finishes by the girls track & field team is, however, a state record.

The following competitive teams have won their respective IHSA Sponsored state championships:

- Table Tennis: 2011
- Chess: 1978–79, 1982–83, 1997–98, 1999–2000, 2000–01, 2004–05

The football team will play home games at Northwestern's new Ryan Field upon the venue's opening, currently planned for the 2026 season.

=== Boys Basketball ===
According to a January 23, 2025 article by Mike Clark published in Sports Illustrated, the Evanston Township High School boys' basketball team was ranked No. 25 in the Illinois high school boys' basketball state rankings.

=== Varsity Chess Team ===
On January 17, 2026, the Evanston Township High School (ETHS) varsity chess team successfully defended its title by winning the conference championship for a second consecutive year, continuing its strong performance in regional competition.

== Activities ==
Students compete in contests in math, science, forensics, world languages, speech, writing, and many other subjects. Examples include the Geometry Bridge Building Contest, the Regional Science Bowl Competition of the Society of Hispanic Engineers, and National Council of Teachers of English (NCTE) annual essay contest. Students can participate in more than 80 clubs and activities at ETHS, including Ambassadors, Wildkit Buddies, Chess Club, E-Squad Step Team, E-Town Tuners Car Club, ETHS Dance Company, Gender and Sexuality Alliance, Hip Hop Club/Slam Team, Latino QUEST, NAACP, Rock Climbing Club, Mock Trial, Student Council and Senate, Table Tennis Team, the ETHS Marching Band and Ultimate Frisbee.

ETHS hosts 3 dances during the school year: Homecoming Dance, Frosh/Soph Formal (grades 9-10), and Senior Prom (grade 12). Student-led publications include the Evanstonian newspaper, the Paper Clip, and the award-winning school yearbook, The Key. ETHS has four honor societies: the Lighthouse Chapter of the National Honor Society (juniors and seniors), the ETHS Chapter of the Tri-M Music Honor Society (juniors and seniors), and ETHS-based honor societies (sophomores and freshmen). Student vocal and instrumental music groups and theater companies perform at least one public performance a month.

Since 2014, ETHS musical ensembles have performed at the Midwest Clinic; the University of Illinois SuperState Festival at the Krannert Center for the Performing Arts; the ILMEA's annual Illinois Music Education Conference; and the Louisville Jazz Festival. In February, the school hosts a regional jazz music festival attended by nearly 50 schools, featuring performances, clinics, and an evening concert with a guest artist.

=== Speech and Debate ===
Students from Evanston captured the IHSA State Championship in Speech in 1951, Policy Debate in 1968, 1971, 1979, 1993, and 1995, Lincoln-Douglas Debate in 2004, 2014, and 2015, and Public Forum Debate in 2015. ETHS is the first school to ever hold the Public Forum and Lincoln-Douglas titles in the same year.

The Debate team earned its first National Speech and Debate Association (formerly the National Forensic League) National Championship in 2012 in Congressional Debate. In 2015, the team captured two more national titles when it won the NCFL Grand National Tournament in Lincoln-Douglas debate and the NSDA National Championship in Extemporaneous Debate. In 2014, ETHS was named a National Debate School of Excellence by the NSDA, indicating that Evanston had placed among the top twenty schools at the NSDA National Championship Tournament.

=== YAMO ===
YAMO is an annual musical sketch comedy show created entirely by students, since 1957, in the school's Upstairs Theatre.

== Notable alumni ==
Some notable alumni include:

- Thomas Tallmadge 1894, architect known for his Prairie School works with Vernon S. Watson as Tallmadge & Watson
- George Ball 1926, US Ambassador to the UN under President Lyndon Johnson
- Lester Crown '43, businessman and son of Henry Crown
- Lenora Moragne '50, nutritionist
- James Zagel '58, U.S. federal judge, presided over the conviction of Illinois Gov. Rod Blagojevich
- Jeff McCracken '70, actor, director, producer known for Kent State, Quiz Show, Boy Meets World, and Dinosaurs (TV Series)
- Eric Friedler '72, tennis player
- Emery Moorehead '72, professional football player, member of the championship 1985 Chicago Bears
- Ben Joravsky '73 American newspaper columnist, author
- Karen Finley '74, performance artist and educator
- Alan Bovik ‘76, two-time Emmy Award-winning television engineer and vision scientist
- Joan Cusack '80, Academy Award-nominated actress
- Nan Warshaw ‘80 co-founder of Bloodshot Records
- Jeremy Piven '83, actor, Ari Gold on Entourage and Harry Gordon Selfridge in Mr. Selfridge
- John Cusack '84, Golden Globe Award-nominated actor
- Ann Roe '84, Wisconsin state legislator
- Alicia “Lecy” Goranson ‘92, actress and writer, Roseanne and The Connors
- Samantha Irby '98, comedian, essayist, blogger, and television writer
- Anders Holm '99, actor and comedy writer, Workaholics
- Zach Gilford '00, actor, Friday Night Lights
- Dov Grumet-Morris '00, ice hockey player
- Anna Lembke, '85, Professor and Medical Director of Addiction Medicine, Stanford University School of Medicine; bestselling author of Dopamine Nation: Finding Balance in the Age of Indulgence
- Jessie Mueller '01, Tony-award-winning actress known for Beautiful: The Carole King Musical and Waitress
- Lena Waithe '02, Emmy-award-winning actress and screenwriter known for Master of None, first black woman to win an Emmy for comedy writing
- Lauren Lapkus '04, actress and comedian known for Orange Is the New Black and Jurassic World
- Laura Harrier '08, actress known for Spider-Man: Homecoming
- Clarke Rosenberg '11, American-Israeli basketball player in the Israel Basketball Premier League
- Nojel Eastern '17, professional basketball player for Rayos de Hermosillo
- Sophie Thatcher '18, actress, Yellowjackets (TV series))

== In popular culture ==
- The 2004 film Mean Girls (2004) is set in Evanston, and its fictitious "North Shore High School" was inspired by Evanston Township High School. Filming took place in Ontario.
