= Deep End (Tsunami album) =

Studio album by Tsunami
- Released: May 31, 1993
- Recorded: July 1992
- Genre: Indie rock, alternative rock
- Length: 46:24
- Label: Simple Machines
- Producer: Tsunami; Ken Heltmueller; Jay Sorrentino

Tsunami chronology
Deep End (1993)	The Heart's Tremolo (1994)

Professional ratings
Review scores
Source	Rating
AllMusic	4/5 stars
The Encyclopedia of Popular Music	3/5 stars
MusicHound Rock: The Essential Album Guide	4/5 stars

Deep End is the first full-length album by American alternative rock band Tsunami, released in 1993.

== Production ==
The album was recorded at Catbox Studios, in Lancaster, Pennsylvania.

== Critical reception ==
Trouser Press wrote: "Toomey and Thomson’s vocal harmonies approach choir-like complexity on 'Lucky' and 'Valentine'; furthermore, the group’s thick, layered arrangements — an intoxicating blur of strummed/dirty guitars, sonorous basslines and catchy melodic hooks — mark Tsunami as pop experimentalists, not ossifying punk rockers."

== Track listing ==
All tracks by Tsunami except where noted.

1. "In a Name" – 3:03
2. "The Spook" – 0:22
3. "Slugger" – 3:29
4. "Lucky" – 3:44
5. "Water's Edge" (Mark Edwards) – 2:59
6. "Genius of Crack" – 4:17
7. "460" – 3:45
8. "Sniffy" – 0:06
9. "Valentine" – 4:24
10. "Skinny" – 3:26
11. "Waxed" – 2:38
12. "Writing Letters" – 3:26
13. "Stupid Like a Fox" – 10:45

== Personnel ==
- Ken Heltmueller – engineer
- John Pamer – drums
- Steve Raskin – artwork
- Jim Saah – photography
- Jay Sorrentino – engineer
- Charles Steck – photography
- Kristin Thomson – guitar, vocals, artwork
- Jenny Toomey – guitar, vox Organ
- Andrew Webster – bass guitar, vocals
