= Mommyheads =

American indie pop band

The Mommyheads
- Years active: 1987–1998, 2008–

The Mommyheads are an indie pop band who played from around 1987 through 1998, disbanded for a decade, and then reformed in 2008. Starting in New York City as the brainchild of singer Adam Cohen (who later changed his name to Adam Elk to avoid confusion with Leonard Cohen's son, a musician also named Adam), the band produced a string of quirky and highly inventive releases on various independent labels, most notably Simple Machines. Their music has been compared to XTC and 80s King Crimson. They relocated to San Francisco in 1990. The band signed to Geffen Records in 1997, producing a single album for the label before breaking up in 1998. Jon Pareles from the NY Times wrote that their Geffen LP had "perfectly balanced melodies". They reunited to record a new CD in 2008 and have been active ever since.

== History ==
The first official Mommyheads record, Magumbo Meatpie, was recorded in late 1987. It was released in 1988 on the Sit and Spin label, which was run out of a NYU dorm room. It was produced by Granz Henman, who was attending NYU, and Joseph A. Kim, who was an Ivy League drop-out. The 7" vinyl EP featured 4 songs that were recorded by Sonic Youth's engineer Wharton Tiers and is now exceedingly rare. Three of the songs later appeared on the Fang records compilation LP Antipop: New York Underground Mix (1988). This Mommyheads was a quartet, listed as "Adam" [Cohen], "Jan" [Kotik], and "Jude" [Reveley] and "Tom" [Kotik] on guitar/dulcimer and bass, respectively.

Their first full-fledged release was Acorn, on Fang Records in 1989, featuring Cohen (vocals, guitar, other instruments), Jan Kotik (drums), and Matt Patrick (vocals, bass), and produced by Chris Rael (of NYC band Church of Betty). The songwriting was split evenly between Cohen and Patrick. Both of these recordings were released while the band members were still in high school. Rael's liner notes to the Acorn CD re-release allude to XTC, James Brown, and Pussy Galore as primary musical influences.

Early 4-track and live demos of Mommyheads songs were released in 1991 or 1992 as the Simple Machines cassette Swiss Army Knife. This collection of home made songs, written and recorded primarily by Adam Cohen, were eccentric but highly original and musically complex. At their core was a whimsical and bittersweet pop sensibility that would underlie most of their subsequent recordings. 4 of the 17 songs would be re-recorded on their "official" releases. Around this time, Simple Machines also released "At the Mall" on a 7-inch compilation EP, Pulley. Two tracks appeared on a live Fang Records compilation.

Their second "real" album, the psychedelic Coming Into Beauty, was released on Simple Machines records in 1992. This was a combination of sessions for two albums which followed Acorn,, the first one released informally on a cassette called Papoose. A move to San Francisco and a lineup change occurred during the recording of this CD; Jan Kotik left and was replaced by two members of NYC group the Connotations: Dan Fisherman (drums, backup vocals) and Michael Holt (vocals, keyboards). (Cohen had played percussion on Connotations tracks released on vinyl in 1987, and Holt and Fisherman had also played in a variety of Fang Records bands.) Before the release of the CD, this new lineup released a limited edition live cassette (Mommyheads Live) of a more recent batch of songs, on Fang Records, most of which never made it to their later CD releases.

Jan Kotík, the original drummer for the Mommyheads, died on December 13, 2007, after being ill with cancer for three years.

Matt Patrick left and was replaced by bass player Jeff Palmer (formerly of Sister Double Happiness), around the time of the recording of the next CD, Flying Suit, in 1994 (Dromedary Records). Live performances from this period, especially in college settings, often included a fetid, bongwater-soaked towel. Songwriting duties shifted mostly to Cohen, with occasional contributions from Holt. Several singles and compilation songs were released in this period, as well. A fourth record, Bingham's Hole, was released on Dot Dot Dash records in 1995. Produced by Peter Katis, this was the band's final independent full-length recording, and it showed the band adding more funk and boogie elements into the mix. Bingham's Hole drew the attention of Don Was who was credited with producing their next record.

On the strength of Bingham's Hole, the band was signed to Geffen Records, which released the Beatle-esque The Mommyheads in 1997. The CD met with mixed reviews. The band was dropped during a label shake-up before the album was even released, and the album was barely promoted. The Mommyheads broke up shortly thereafter, playing their final show in San Francisco in February 1998. Many fans hold this as a perfect example of a major label "ruining" a band that had established critical success and a solid fan base with the quality of its independent recordings and excellent live shows.

Following the breakup, most members of the band have gone on to solo and other collaborative projects. Adam Elk released a solo album called Labello, and is now a successful composer for television commercials. Jeff Palmer joined Sub Pop band Sunny Day Real Estate and Granfaloon Bus. Michael Holt has gone on to record several solo albums. Dan Fisherman became a computer programmer for a small San Francisco computer company and teaches mathematics, philosophy and recording for the Randolph School in Wappingers Falls, New York

Mommyheads songs have been covered on record by Jenny Toomey, Andrew Bird ("Needmore, PA" on Antidote) and Someone Still Loves You Boris Yeltsin ("Accident" and "Cora," the latter on the EP Someone Still Loves You Michael Holt).

Following the death of original drummer, Jan Kotik, The Mommyheads re-united for a tribute show in New York City. Shortly after, they decided to reform and record a new album, You're Not A Dream, which was released in 2008. In the spring of 2010, the band released a remastered version of Flying Suit containing three bonus tracks recorded during the same era.

The Mommyheads are featured in a 2010 Time Warner Cable television ad for the company's broadband internet offerings. They jam out together all from different locations via the internet.

In 2010, Jason McNair joined the band on bass guitar, replacing Jeff Palmer.

A retrospective album entitled "Finest Specimens" was released on the Dromedary Records label on Oct 19, 2010. The album contained cuts from most of the band's studio albums as well as previously unreleased live tracks, demos, and one new song.

Their 2011 release, Delicate Friction, was the band's first record of all-new material since the mid-1990s.

In the spring of 2012, the band announced the release of Vulnerable Boy on Dromedary Records in North America and Europe, and on Dead Frog Records in Scandinavia. In 2018, The Mommyheads released Soundtrack to the World's End, an album with several songs about the quickly approaching time of social, ecological, and economic crisis.

In 2019, The Mommyheads released Future You on their own label in the US and FanFar! Records in Scandinavia https://www.facebook.com/fanfar.se/ The record peaked on the NCAA college radio charts at #85 and the Sub Modern Charts at #40 and was well reviewed by the press. The band embarked on a 9 city tour of Scandinavia in Sept of 2019.

In 2020, the band re-released their self-titled 1997 Geffen record. It was the 14th most added LP in College Radio in mid-Feb 2020 and was called "their masterpiece" by Big Takeover Magazine in Spring 2020. That same year, the band released New Kings of Pop on their own label in the U.S. and FanFar! Records in Europe. The LP eventually peaked at #58 on College radio and #16 on Sub Modern Radio in Oct of 2020. TakeEffect Magazine declared "I think it’s safe to say that The Mommyheads are at a creative high, and we’re all better off for it"

In 2021, The Mommyheads Re-Released a Remastered Version of "Coming Into Beauty" on their own Label in the Us The LP was the 12th most added Record in College Radio the week of Feb 16th and The LP eventually peaked at #67 on College radio with Glide Magazine Proclaiming "Coming Into Beauty remains the most potent document of the Mommyheads at their most unhinged and daring." Also, in 2021, the band released Age of Isolation in September eventually reaching #29 on College Radio. This is the band's highest college radio ranking with famous rock critic Bill Kopp proclaiming, "Intelligent, literate rock doesn’t get much more intelligent – or literate, for that matter – than The Mommyheads, and now, thirty-plus years after their debut, they’re making some of the best music of their career."

The bootleg only Swiss Army Knife was remastered by Fred Kavorkian and released on the band's label on Feb 11th 2022 with Wildfire Music saying "While the sound of the bootleg recording is 'homespun' and 'idiosyncratic,' that contributes to their fresh-sounding feel even after the passage of almost 30 years."

The band released Genius Killer in September 2022, eventually reaching #58 on College and Community Radio. "As this band quickly approaches their 40th anniversary as a unit, it seems like they are only getting better with age," said Rock and Roll Globe.

They then released Coney Island Kid in 2023. The band toured Sweden and the US in early September with several sold out shows.

One Eyed Band was released in late Nov 2024 and Hit a Career Peak of #10 on College and Community Radio in the US and made it on a bunch of Year End Top 10 Lists . The band toured The West Coast in the Fall to long time fans in Oct 2024

No Quietus was released on Nov 7 2025. It made it to #38 on College and #17 Sub Modern radio during December of that year and a bunch of Year End Top 10 Lists .

== Discography ==
=== Albums ===
- Acorn (1989)
- Swiss Army knife (1990)
- Coming Into Beauty (1992)
- Flying Suit(1994)
- Bingham's Hole (1995)
- The Mommyheads (1997)
- You're Not A Dream (2008)
- Delicate Friction (2011)
- Vulnerable Boy (2012)
- Soundtrack to the World’s End (2018)
- Future You (2019)
- New Kings of Pop (2020)
- Age of Isolation (2021)
- Genius Killer (2022)
- Coney Island Kid (2023)
- One Eyed Band (2024)
- No Quietus (2025)
- Super Emotional Intelligence (2027)

=== Cassette albums ===
- Live (Fang Records) 1991
- Swiss Army Knife (Simple Machines) 1992 [see 2022 digital release above]
- The Yellow Tape 5-song EP tape (Black Widow Management) 1993
  [All 5 recordings later rereleased on various singles and comps, as listed below.]

=== Singles and EPs ===
- Magumbo Meatpie EP (Sit & Spin Records) 1987-8
- "At the Mall," Pulley EP (Simple Machines) 1991
  [May have been recorded in 1989.]
- "The World Is Round"/"Remedy" (Hairy/Simple Machines) 1993
- "Time Bomb"/"Gnocci" (Sonic Swirl Records, split single w/ Witch Hazel) 1994
- "Tension" (5", I-Sore Records, club split single w/ Toast) 1994
- "Day Job," Making Music Your Own (You Say When records—split single w/ The Jennifers) 1995

=== Compilations ===
- "Skin Is Color Blind," "Imperfect Love," "Butcher's Daughter," Antipop: NY Underground (Fang) 1988
  [These tracks are on Magumbo Meatpie, possibly in slightly different mixes.]
- "Queen of the Ant Race," "Minds Are Made of This," Thirsty Ears: Fang Records Bands Live at the Knitting Factory (Fang) 1991
  [This collection also features Holt, Fisherman and Kotik as members of several of the other bands.]
- "At The Mall," The Machines: Simple Machines 7"s (1990-1993) (Simple Machines) 1993 [track from Pulley EP]
- "Hepsaba's Compass," radio performance, They Came, They Played, They Blocked The Driveway (WFMU) 1993
- "Box," Lemon Lime vol.1 (SpinArt) 1995 [track from The Yellow Tape]
- 'Mansion Improv', Listener Supported (Cassette), (You Say When) 1996
- "Over," "Tension," "Moisture," Come and Get It (Hairy Records) 1996 ["Tension" also on second version of Bingham's Hole.]
- "Over," Greenlight Go (Bottle Cap) 1996
- "Moisture," Eyesore: A Stab at the Residents (Vaccination) 1996
- "Christmas Song," "Christmas Song (Catskills version)," All-Star Holiday (Tarquin Records) 1997
  [These tracks may only feature Adam Elk.]
- "It's Okay," San Francisco: A Music City Compilation (Trocadero Records) 1998 [track from Bingham's Hole]
- "Blind Like A Camera," Tiny Idols (Snowglobe Records) 2005 [track from Coming Into Beauty]

== Members ==
=== Current Band ===
- Adam Elk (Cohen) – guitar, vocal, plus occasional mandolin, melodica, autoharp, piano (1987–1998, 2008–current)
- Michael Holt – keyboards, vocals, occasional guitar (1990–1998, 2008–current)
- Dan Fisherman – drums, harmony vocals (1990–1998, 2008–current)
- Jason McNair – bass (2010–current)
- Barry Pollack - touring keys (2024–current)

=== Long-Term Past Members ===
- Jeff Palmer – bass (1993–1998, 2008)
- Matt Devin Patrick – bass, guitar, vocals (1987–1993)
- Jan Kotik – drums, percussion, marimba (1987–1989 or 1990)

=== Short-Term Past Members ===
- Max Bartos - touring guitar, keys, backing vocals (2024)
- Jackie Simons – guitar, keys (2021–2023)
- Rick Wilson – bass (1993)

(pre-"Flying Suit" "Yellow Tape"/singles tracks)

- Eric Bonerz – drums (circa 1990 or 1991)

(appears only on the live Thirsty Ears compilation.)

- Gary Wertz – guitar, vocals (circa 1990 or 1991)

(appears on the live Thirsty Ears compilation; vocals, one co-write on "Swiss Army Knife")

- Jude Reveley – guitar, dulcimer (1987–1988)
- Tom Kotik – bass (1987–1988)

(these last two appear only on the "Magumbo Meatpie" EP and its "Antipop" LP re-release.)

- Cyrus Sink – bass (circa 1988)
