= Brian MacKenzie Infoshop =

Former infoshop in USA

Coordinates: 38°54′33.7″N 77°1′26.9″W

The Brian MacKenzie Infoshop was a self-managed social center located within the Arthur S. Flemming Center at 1426 Ninth St., in the Shaw neighborhood of Washington, D.C. The collective was first established in 1999 and the physical space opened its doors in May 2003 and closed at the end of December 2008. A volunteer-run anarchist collective ran the basement infoshop from May 2003 until December 2008. For the first four years, it was open every day to sell books and records. It also served as a community center, hangout, and meeting place for local radicals. Events included talks by Ward Churchill, Mattilda Bernstein Sycamore, Nate Powell, and Josh MacPhee.

The infoshop shared a building with offices for the Gray Panthers, Emmaus, the InterFaith Conference of Metropolitan Washington and a Catholic Worker bookshop. Its lease was co-signed by Ian MacKaye of Fugazi and it was named for an American University student active in the radical community who died of a heart seizure at a D.C. hardcore show at the Wilson Center in 1999. Participants in the local activist organization Positive Force were amongst the founders, and the co-ordinators were brothers Ryan and Wade Fletcher.
