= A Data Learn the Language =

Studio album by The Mercury Program
- Released: September 10, 2002
- Genre: Post-rock
- Length: 47:06
- Label: Tiger Style

The Mercury Program chronology
All the Suits Began to Fall Off (2001)	A Data Learn the Language (2002)	Chez Viking (2009)

Professional ratings
Review scores
Source	Rating
AllMusic	4/5 stars

A Data Learn the Language is the third studio album by American post-rock band The Mercury Program, released in 2002 on Tiger Style Records. AllMusic called it "consistently melodic, rhythmically varied, and unfailingly listenable."

== Track listing ==
No.	Title	Length
1.	"Tequesta"	7:38
2.	"Fragile or Possibly Extinct"	7:19
3.	"Slightly Drifting"	6:24
4.	"Egypt"	4:52
5.	"To/From Iceland"	5:41
6.	"You Yourself Are Too Serious"	5:23
7.	"Gently Turned on Your Head"	4:03
8.	"Sultans of el Sur"	5:46
Total length:		47:06
