= Red Panda Records =

Record label active during the 2000s

Red Panda Records was a record label active during most of the 2000s. It was founded by Mascott's Kendall Jane Meade, who subsequently released two of her band's albums through the label. Other artists who released albums on the label included Jennifer O'Connor and the Naysayer.
