= Lenora Moragne =

American nutritionist (1931–2020)

- Born: September 29, 1931; Evanston, Illinois, U.S.
- Died: April 1, 2020 (aged 88); Washington, DC, U.S.
- Education: Iowa State University; Cornell University
- Scientific career
- Fields: Nutrition
- Institutions: Food and Nutrition Service
- Thesis: "Influence of Household Differentiation on Food Habits among Low-Income Urban Negro Families" (1969)

Lenora Moragne (1931–2020) was an American nutritionist. She headed the Division of Nutrition Education and Training at the Food and Nutrition Service of the U.S. Department of Agriculture from 1972 to 1977. She served on the board of directors of the Academy of Nutrition and Dietetics from 1981 to 1984. In the late 1970s, she worked as a staff member of the United States Senate Committee on Agriculture, Nutrition, and Forestry, serving as its coordinator of nutrition policy, and was a legislative assistant for Senator Bob Dole. Moragne received her PhD from Cornell University and taught foods and nutrition at several colleges.

== Early life and education ==
Lenora Moragne was born on September 29, 1931, in Evanston, Illinois, to an African-American family. Her parents were Linnie Lee and Joseph Moragne. She graduated from Evanston Township High School in 1950. She studied hospital dietetics and earned a BS degree in nutrition from Iowa State University in 1953. She worked at Community Hospital in Evanston as chief dietician from 1955 to 1957.

Moragne was granted a research fellowship at Cornell University in 1959 and earned her MS in nutrition there in 1963. As a research assistant at Cornell, she studied the effects of temperature on the nutritional quality of food. She earned her PhD in foods and nutrition from Cornell in 1969. Her doctoral dissertation was on "Influence of Household Differentiation on Food Habits among Low-Income Urban Negro Families".

== Career ==
Moragne was an assistant professor of foods and nutrition at North Carolina College from 1965 to 1967. From 1968 to 1971, Moragne worked for General Foods as a product publicist. She lectured in nutrition at Cornell in 1971 and 1972. During the same period, she taught foods and nutrition at Hunter College and Lehman College.

In 1972, Moragne was hired by the U.S. Department of Agriculture's Food and Nutrition Service. She worked there until 1975, heading the Division of Nutrition Education and Training. In 1974, she authored Focus on Food, a junior high school textbook and a book on infant care. In 1977, Moragne joined the staff of the United States Senate Committee on Agriculture, Nutrition, and Forestry. She was a legislative assistant for Kansas Senator Bob Dole from 1977 to 1979. She was appointed coordinator of nutrition policy for the Health and Human Services Division of the Committee in 1979. Ebony magazine called her a "grand lady" among the Black aides on Capitol Hill.

Moragne served on the board of directors of the Academy of Nutrition and Dietetics from 1981 to 1984. She founded Nutrition Legislation Services, a legislation-monitoring company based in Washington, DC. She was elected president of the Society for Nutrition Education in 1986, serving in that role in 1987 and 1988. She founded the newsletter Black Congressional Monitor in the late 1980s.

Moragne died on April 1, 2020, in Washington, DC.
