= Future of Music Coalition =

American nonprofit organization

- Abbreviation: FMC
- Formation: 2000, United States
- Type: Non-profit organization
- Purpose: National nonprofit education, research and advocacy organization for musicians
- Headquarters: Washington, District of Columbia, U.S.
- President: Michael Bracy
- Website: www.futureofmusic.org

Future of Music Coalition (FMC) is a U.S. 501(c)(3) national non-profit organization specializing in education, research and advocacy for musicians with a focus on issues at the intersection of music technology, policy and law.

== Background ==
Future of Music Coalition was founded in 2000 by Jenny Toomey, Kristin Thomson, Michael Bracy, Walter McDonough, and Brian Zisk.

Jenny Toomey and Kristin Thomson formed the indie rock band Tsunami in 1990 and ran the Arlington, VA-based independent label Simple Machines Records from 1990 to 1998. While running Simple Machines, Toomey and Thomson published four editions of The Mechanic's Guide, a do-it-yourself manual for the music business. Following the dissolution of Simple Machines for logistic and financial reasons, Toomey and Thomson worked with the indie rock website Insound to launch The Machine, "an online forum dedicated to exploring the possibilities and pitfalls of digital music" from the perspective of indie labels and artists. The Machine ran from 1998 to 2000, and featured interviews with musicians, independent label heads and technologists, including future FMC co-founder Brian Zisk.

In June 2000, Toomey, Thomson, Bracy, McDonough and Zisk released "The Future of Music Manifesto" announcing the formation of Future of Music Coalition.

Toomey served as Executive Director of FMC until 2008, when she left to become the Media and Cultural Policy program officer for the Ford Foundation. Thomson served in various senior staff roles from FMC's founding until 2016.

Michael Bracy co-founded the independent label Misra Records in 1999. He joined the Future of Music Coalition in July 2001 as its Government Affairs Director. He currently serves as a co-founding emeritus member of FMC and is a partner in the government affairs firm Bracy Tucker Brown & Valanzano.

Walter McDonough is a lawyer and academic with a background in copyright, technology and the independent music industry. As an attorney, he has represented the Dresden Dolls and Mission of Burma, among others. He is currently a co-founding emeritus member of FMC, and serves on the board of performance rights organization SoundExchange.

Brian Zisk is an entrepreneur and technology industry consultant specializing in digital media, web broadcasting, and distribution technologies. Zisk founded the Internet radio station Green Witch in 1999 and co-founded the real-time search company Collecta in 2009. He currently serves as a co-founding emeritus member of FMC and is the founder and executive producer of the SF MusicTech Summit.

Musician Jean Cook joined the FMC staff in 2005. Prior to FMC she helped launch Air Traffic Control, a nonpartisan organization founded by and for artists. ATC was dedicated to helping progressive songwriters and musicians lend their talents, resources and energies to educate voters about the positions and records of elected officials and candidates and to create real change around a host of progressive issues.

== Mission and activities ==
FMC's stated mission is "to ensure a diverse musical culture where artists flourish, are compensated fairly for their work, and where fans can find the music they want."

FMC hosts public events, including the annual Future of Music Policy Summit; conducts original research; submits public comments, documents and testimony to legal proceedings; and organizes advocacy campaigns in an ongoing effort to raise awareness of policy issues in terms of their effect on working musicians and the independent music community.

FMC's current projects relate to issues of media ownership, particularly in the U.S. radio market; Internet and telecommunications policy; artist advocacy and community engagement; artist compensation in the music industry; and copyright.

In 2003, then Executive Director Jenny Toomey testified in front of the Federal Communications Commission about the results of FMC's research on radio consolidation, and its negative impacts on the music community.

In 2009, then Executive Director Jean Cook testified in front of the New York City Council about why net neutrality was important to musicians. In 2014, then VP for Policy and Education Casey Rae testified in front of the Senate Judiciary Committee about the importance of preserving an open internet.

== Research ==
=== Major label contract clause critique ===
In October 2001, FMC published its first major collaborative research project, a detailed breakdown of standard contracts offered by major labels. The report, compiled with the help of entertainment industry attorneys, paired potentially problematic contract clauses with "easy-to-understand critiques in the hopes that even those who are completely unfamiliar with the music business can understand the implications that result from signing a standard major label deal."

=== Effects of radio deregulation ===
On November 18, 2002, FMC released a report entitled "Radio Deregulation: Has It Served Musicians and Citizens?" The report documented the effects of radio station ownership consolidation following the Telecommunications Act of 1996.

On January 30, 2003, Jenny Toomey testified before the Senate Commerce Committee hearing on media ownership, alongside L. Lowry Mays (Clear Channel), Edward Fritts (National Association of Broadcasters), Robert Short (Short Broadcasting), and Don Henley of the Eagles (representing the Recording Artists Coalition).

=== Payola ===
In 2008, Adam Marcus, working on behalf of FMC and the American Association of Independent Music, released "Change That Tune", a musician-oriented guide explaining the effects of payola and its ongoing impact on the ability of independent artists and labels to engage with the radio market in the 21st century. "Change That Tune" documents investigations by the New York State Attorney General and the FCC from 2003 to 2007, which uncovered "alarming evidence" that "payola was alive and well in the music and radio industries.”

In April 2009, FMC released "Same Old Song", a study of the composition of radio playlists nationwide between the years 2005 and 2008, along with a companion study of playlist composition in the state of New York. Both reports found little measurable change in station playlist composition during that period, suggesting that major broadcasters' 2007 settlement with the FCC and the "rules of engagement" negotiated by the American Association of Independent Music in the wake of the investigation had not been effective in diversifying playlist content or ending payola practices.

=== Health insurance ===
In March 2010, Future of Music Coalition conducted an online survey to gauge the level of health insurance among musicians. The survey found that, of the 1,451 respondents, 33 percent said they do not have health insurance. This was nearly twice the national average of 17 percent uninsured at the time, as estimated by the Kaiser Family Foundation. In 2013, prior to the beginning of many of the major provisions in the Affordable Care Act (ACA), the Future of Music Coalition (FMC) and the Artists’ Health Insurance Resource Center conducted an online survey of US-based artists across all disciplines about their access to insurance. The survey found that, of the 3,402 artist respondents, 43 percent did not currently have health insurance.

=== Artist Revenue Streams ===
In January 2011, FMC announced the Artist Revenue Streams research project, a multi-method research initiative funded by the Doris Duke Charitable Foundation to assess how US musicians and composers working in all genres are currently generating income. The project was inspired by the widely distributed article by Kristin Thomson entitled "The 29 Streams", noting the wide variety of ways that musicians and composers can make money from music. The research includes in-depth interviews with musicians and composers, case studies, and an online survey, open from September 6 to October 28, 2011. The resulting data set includes over 80 qualitative interviews, 7 case studies, and survey data from over 5,000 US-based musicians, and over 20 data memos, including "Roles, Revenue, and Responsibilities: The Changing Nature of Being a Working Musician", published in the international sociological journal Work and Occupations, and Money from Music: Survey Evidence on Musicians’ Revenue and Lessons About Copyright Incentives, published in the Arizona Law Review.

== Campaigns ==
=== Rock the Net ===
In October 2007, FMC launched the Rock the Net campaign, a coalition of musicians and labels who support network neutrality.

Network neutrality, or Net neutrality, sometimes described as the "open Internet", is the principle that preserves Internet access without restriction to the content, sites, platforms, equipment or modes of communication allowed. FMC explains its engagement in the issue thus: "All artists deserve the right to use the internet to cultivate listeners, and fans deserve to make their own choices of how and where to access legitimate content." Founding supporters of the Rock the Net campaign included R.E.M., Pearl Jam, Kronos Quartet, Boots Riley, Ted Leo, OK Go, Bob Mould (Hüsker Dü), Kathleen Hanna (Bikini Kill, Le Tigre), Death Cab for Cutie, and Jimmy Tamborello (the Postal Service).

In July 2008, FMC released the benefit compilation Rock the Net: Musicians for Net Neutrality on Thirsty Ear Recordings, featuring 15 tracks by Rock the Net participants including Bright Eyes, Wilco, Aimee Mann, Guster, They Might Be Giants, and the Wrens. Rolling Stone's Rock & Roll Daily called the compilation "one of the sexiest benefit records in some time."

=== Get the HINT ===
In 2002, FMC conducted an online survey of working musicians to gauge their level of health insurance coverage. The survey found that, "of the nearly 2,700 respondents, 44 percent of them did not have health insurance." The report expressed concern for the lack of health insurance coverage among musicians and formulated a plan to address the issue.

In 2005, FMC received a grant from the Nathan Cummings Foundation to develop the Health Insurance Navigation Tool (HINT), a free call-in service offering musicians advice and information about their health insurance options.

In 2010, FMC conducted a follow-up survey which found that "of the 1,451 respondents, 33 percent said they do not have health insurance." Although the percentage of uninsured musicians had decreased since 2002, it was still nearly twice the national average of 17 percent uninsured, as estimated by the Kaiser Family Foundation in 2008.

=== I Support Community Radio ===
FMC's "I Support Community Radio" campaign collects video testimonials from artists addressing the importance of non-commercial and community radio. Participants include Saul Williams, the Indigo Girls, David Harrington of the Kronos Quartet and Jon Langford of the Mekons.

=== Public performance right for sound recordings ===
In 2005, FMC began petitioning Congress to establish a public performance right for sound recordings in order to more equitably compensate all participants in the creative process and correct what it views an unnecessary exception within U.S. copyright law.
