= All the Suits Began to Fall Off =

EP by The Mercury Program
- Released: April 24, 2001
- Genre: Post-rock
- Length: 30:39
- Label: Boxcar

The Mercury Program chronology
From The Vapor of Gasoline (2000)	All the Suits Began to Fall Off (2001)	A Data Learn the Language (2002)

Professional ratings
Review scores
Source	Rating
Allmusic	4/5 stars

All the Suits Began to Fall Off is an EP by American post-rock band The Mercury Program, released in 2001 on Boxcar Records. Allmusic called it an "excessively rich and gorgeous five-song EP".

== Track listing ==
No.	Title	Length
1.	"The Secret to Quiet"	3:58
2.	"There Are Thousands Sleeping in Peace"	5:51
3.	"Marianas"	7:29
4.	"Undiscovered Genius of the Mississippi Delta"	4:50
5.	"Delicate Answer"	8:31
Total length:		30:39
