= The Mommyheads (album) =

Studio album by the Mommyheads
- Released: 1997
- Studio: Ocean Way, The Pool House
- Genre: Pop
- Label: DGC
- Producer: The Mommyheads, Don Was

The Mommyheads chronology
| Bingham's Hole (1995) | The Mommyheads (1997) | You're Not a Dream (2008) |

The Mommyheads is an album by the American band the Mommyheads, released in 1997. The first single was "Jaded".

The band supported the album with a North American tour. The Mommyheads was nominated for a Bammie Award. The album was barely marketed by Geffen; the band went dormant for more than a decade shortly after its release.

== Production ==
The album was produced by the band and Don Was, and was recorded at Ocean Way Recording and Was's home studio. It was mixed by Jim Scott. "Wake Up Irene" used the Tower of Power horn section. Jon Brion played a Chamberlin on "Screwed" and "Thought of You".

== Critical reception ==
Professional ratings
Review scores
| Source | Rating |
|---|---|
| AllMusic | 4/5 stars |
| Contra Costa Times | B |
| MusicHound Rock: The Essential Album Guide | 3.5/5 stars |
| Rocky Mountain News | B− |
| The Tampa Tribune | 3.5/4 stars |

The Dayton Daily News called the album "pristine pop from a quartet that's spent a lot of time constructively observing the world around them before they put songwriting pen to paper." The New York Times deemed the band "postgraduate students of the Beach Boys and the Beatles, out to capture the nuances of longing in perfectly balanced melodies." The St. Petersburg Times advised: "Mix one part Wings Paul McCartney with two parts Weezer, then toss in an old '70s organ for a quirky sentimentality, and you have the major label debut of the Mommyheads."

Stereo Review noted that "the Mommyheads seem to be rooted in the notion of pop as something that's both ambitious and instantly appealing, something that's accessibly in tune while sounding slightly off-kilter." Guitar Player determined that "few things in music are as subtle as pure pop... [Adam] Cohen produces the kind of underplayed guitar that recent Brit poppers can only fantasize about." The Contra Costa Times concluded that "the spirit of the Abbey Road-era Beatles glides in and out of the Mommyheads self-titled new album so frequently it's almost eerie."

AllMusic praised the "mature pop sound."

== Track listing ==
| No. | Title | Length |
|---|---|---|
| 1. | "Jaded" |
| 2. | "I'm in Awe" |
| 3. | "Bellhop" |
| 4. | "In the Way" |
| 5. | "You Keep On Looking Back" |
| 6. | "Sad Girl" |
| 7. | "Wake Up Irene" |
| 8. | "Thought of You" |
| 9. | "Monkey" |
| 10. | "Would He Know?" |
| 11. | "Corky" |
| 12. | "Screwed" |
