= The Mercury Program =

American musical group

- Origin: Gainesville, Florida, U.S.
- Genres: Post-rock, instrumental rock
- Years active: 1997–present
- Labels: Lovitt Records; Boxcar Records; Tiger Style Records
- Members: Whit Travisano; Thomas Reno; Sander Travisano; Dave Lebleu

The Mercury Program is an American musical group composed of Dave Lebleu on drums, Sander Travisano on bass guitar, Tom Reno on guitar, and Whit Travisano on vibraphone and piano.

== History ==
The first three members formed a trio in August 1997 and Whit Travisano joined in late 1999. Originally based in Gainesville, Florida, the band members live in different cities across the United States.

Mercury Program's first two albums feature sparse, spoken-word vocals. However, beginning with the release of the 2001 EP All the Suits Began to Fall Off, the band moved to an entirely instrumental format.

The band toured extensively in support of their critically acclaimed 2002 album A Data Learn the Language. Then, following the release of the split EP Confines of Heat in 2003, the Mercury Program went on extended hiatus, sporadically working on new material over the next several years. Since then, the band has reconvened occasionally to record, release and tour. Chez Viking was released November 24, 2009, and on May 20, 2016, the band released the EP New Myths, both on Lovitt Records.

In 2018, A Data Learn the Language was recut and reissued as a double LP on vinyl.

== Discography ==
- Albums
  - The Mercury Program (Tiger Style, 1999)
  - From The Vapor of Gasoline (Tiger Style, 2000)
  - A Data Learn the Language (Tiger Style, 2002)
  - Chez Viking (Lovitt Records, 2009)
- EPs
  - All the Suits Began to Fall Off (Boxcar, 2001)
  - Confines of Heat (split release with Maserati + DVD, Kindercore, 2003)
  - New Myths (Lovitt Records, 2016)
- Compilation Appearances
  - Back To Donut! (A No Idea Compilation) (No Idea, 1998)
- Singles / 7 inches
  - The Mercury Program / Versailles 7" (split release with Versailles, Boxcar, 1998)
  - Lights Out In Georgia 7" (Boxcar, 1998)
