= The Rogers Sisters =

US musical group

- Origin: Brooklyn
- Genre: indie rock
- Years active: 1999–2007

The Rogers Sisters were an American indie rock band from Brooklyn, active from 1999 to 2007, composed of sisters Laura and Jennifer Rogers and multi-instrumentalist/vocalist Miyuki Furtado.

== History ==
The Rogers Sisters formed in 1999 after the breakup of Ruby Falls. The group released its debut on Troubleman Unlimited in 2002. The album's cover featured a Xerox collage portrait of George W. Bush. Following its release, the group embarked on tours of the United States as well as the United Kingdom. A sophomore effort, Three Fingers, followed on the same label in 2004. After signing to Too Pure, the group re-released Three Fingers and toured the UK and US again. Tours in Europe and Australia followed before releasing their most recent effort, The Invisible Deck, in 2006.

The group disbanded in 2007.

Furtado went on to record and tour with several bands including Brooklyn bands Midnight Masses and Shock Cinema as well as instrumental post-rock quartet, Vivid Low Sky.

Furtado’s current project is country/alt country band, Divining Rod, in which he sings, plays guitar and drums simultaneously. The band has several releases on Kilipaki Records.

== Members ==
- Miyuki Ken Furtado
- Laura Carolyn Rogers
- Jennifer Elizabeth Rogers

== Discography ==
- Purely Evil (Troubleman Unlimited, 2002)
- Three Fingers (Too Pure, U.K./Troubleman Unlimited, U.S., 2004; re-released in the U.S. on Too Pure, 2005)
- The Invisible Deck (Too Pure, 2006)
