= Tara Jane O'Neil =

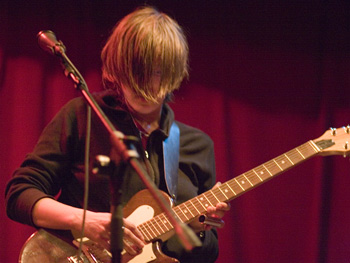
- O'Neil performing at Tonic in New York City, 6 October 2006

Background information
- Also known as: Tara Jane ONeil; TJO
- Born: November 22, 1972 (age 53)
- Origin: Chicago, Illinois, United States
- Occupations: Musician; visual artist
- Instruments: Vocals; guitar; bass guitar; drums; banjo; tambourine; keyboard
- Years active: 1992–present
- Labels: Quarterstick Records; K Records; Kranky; Orindal Records
- Formerly of: Rodan; The Sonora Pine; Retsin; The Naysayer
- Website: http://tarajaneoneil.com/

Tara Jane O'Neil (born November 22, 1972) (surname sometimes written as "ONeil"; sometimes credited as TJO) is an American multi-instrumentalist, songwriter, audio recording engineer, and visual artist based out of Los Angeles, California, United States.

== Biography ==
O'Neil is a multi-instrumentalist, composer, audio engineer and visual artist. She creates melodic and experimental music under her own name and in collaboration with friends. Her recordings and live performances range from solo singing to noise improvisations. O'Neil has composed and performed music and sound for films, theater, and dance performances, and written large and small ensemble experimental architectures.

O'Neil began her music career as the bassist and vocalist for the influential Louisville, Kentucky post-rock group Rodan. After their breakup in 1994, she moved to New York, where she joined Retsin, Ida Retsin Family (a collaboration between Retsin and Ida), The Sonora Pine, and The Naysayer. She released her first solo record in 2000.

O'Neil is also a notable visual artist. Her work has been exhibited in New York City, Barcelona, Tokyo, Kyoto, Louisville, and Portland, among other places. Her artwork has appeared on her own solo record covers, on the record covers of many other groups (Retsin, Ida, The Naysayer, Castanets, etc.), in poetry books by Cynthia Nelson (Raven Days and The Kentucky Rules) and Maggie Nelson (the cover of Something Bright, Then Holes), in the magazines Punk Planet, Magnet, The Wire, Venus Zine, Copper Press, and various international publications. Who Takes a Feather, a book of her drawings and paintings, was published in 2004 by Tokyo-based Map Press. In 2007, Wings. Strings. Meridians. A Blighted Bestiary was published by Yeti Publications, including an album of live recordings, four-track demos, and outtakes.

O'Neil starred in the 1994 indie film Half-Cocked as herself, credited as "Rhonda" although her character has also been referred to as "Tara."

== Partial discography ==
=== Solo ===
==== Albums ====
- Peregrine (2000, Quarterstick Records)
- In the Sun Lines (2001, Quarterstick Records)
- TJO TKO (2002, Mr. Lady Records)
- You Sound, Reflect (2004, Quarterstick Records)
- In Circles (2006, Quarterstick Records)
- A Ways Away (2009, K Records)
- Where Shine New Lights (2014, Kranky)
- Tara Jane O'Neil (2017, Gnomonsong Records)
- The Cool Cloud of Okayness (2024, Orindal Records)

==== EPs ====
- The Joy Of... (2002, Acuarela Discos [Spain])
- Who Takes a Feather companion release 3" CD-EP (2003, Map Press [Japan])
- Vanishing Point (2004, self-released digital download; original score for the Naomi Izuka play At the Vanishing Point)
- Tracer (2005, Compass Tone [Japan])
- A Raveling (2005, Acuarela Discos [Spain])
- After a Dark Seven (2006, self-released CD-R)
- Light Up Screen (2006, self-released digital download; collection of short film scores)
- Live and Covered EP (2008, self-released CD-R; European tour EP)

==== Singles ====
- "Tie a Ribbon" / "Another Sunday Saint" / "If Your Youth Is Green" (aka Troubleman Solo Singles Series #6) 7" single (2000, Troubleman Unlimited Records)
- "April 3, 2009" (2009, self-released digital download; live adaptation of the song "The Drowning Electric")

==== Compilation albums ====
- Bones (2004, Preservation [Australia]) (compilation of demos, alternate versions, outtakes, and songs from singles)
- Marrow (2004, self-released CD-R) (most songs also appear on Bones; features hand-painted and numbered covers)
- To Trace a Raveling EP (2006, Mississippi Records) (12" vinyl release; combines the Tracer and A Raveling EPs)
- Wings. Strings. Meridians. companion release CD (2007, Yeti Publications) (compilation of home recordings, live tracks, and film scores)

=== Collaborations ===
- Music for a Meteor Shower (with Daniel Littleton) (2002, Tiger Style Records)
- Tara Jane O'Neil and Nikaido Kazumi (with Nikaido Kazumi) (2011, K Records)
- Medusa Smack/100 Gongs for Arieto (with Eleh) (2015, Important Records)
