= The Hated =

American rock music group

- Origin: Annapolis, Maryland
- Genres: Punk rock; emo; post-hardcore
- Years active: 1984-1989, 2023
- Labels: Vermin Scum; Numero Group
- Past members: Erik Fisher; Daniel Littleton; Colin Meeder; Mike Bonner; Kenny Hill; John Irvine; Jason Fisher; Miggy Littleton

The Hated was an American punk band from Annapolis, Maryland. The band is often associated with the Revolution Summer movement among D.C. punk bands. The band experimented with a diverse sound that often combined a hardcore sound with folk influences. They are considered a precursor and influence to much of the Emo genre to come in the 90's, despite much of the band's releases being scarce in quantity.

== History ==
The band was formed by childhood friends Erik Fisher and Daniel Littleton, who had had the idea of starting a band together since watching public screenings of the Beatles films Let It Be and Magical Mystery Tour. Their first pursuit in music was a two-month project called The Dead Beatles, where they would play faster and distorted versions of Beatles songs with the same harmonies, which Fisher described as a band where they "cover The Beatles but sound like the Sex Pistols". This would serve as the basis for later music, along with inspirations from bands Spastic Rats, MDC, and Minutemen. Spastic Rats drummer Kenny Hill would later go on to play for The Hated.

Littleton's good friend Colin Meeder and drummer Mike Bonner joined the duo after Fisher conceptualized the band during his stay at a kibbutz in the summer of 1984. Their first album, The Best Piece Of Shit Vol. 3, was recorded and released with this line-up in 1985. By the end of that year, Kenny Hill would become the new drummer for the band, and The Hated would put out releases under his label, Vermin Scum.

The Hated recorded their final studio album, Every Song, in 1989, after Erik Fisher's choice to resume college education. The original incarnation of the band played their final show in Crofton, Maryland, in the summer of 1989.

Following the disbandment of The Hated, Daniel Littleton would form the indie band Ida with Elizabeth Mitchell.

A large amount of unreleased music was created during The Hated's time as a band. In the early 2000's, there were attempts from Troubleman Unlimited Records and Daniel Littleton to find and archive this music which ultimately fell through, but this search was later revitalized.

In March 2020, former drummer Kenny Hill died at age 55 in Brooklyn Park, Maryland.

The process of archiving and restoring The Hated's unreleased music was continued by Numero Group co-founder Ken Shipley, along with Daniel Littleton in the early 2020s. Two compilations of this material were released by Numero Group, The Best Piece of Shit, Vol. 4 in 2022, and Flux, in 2023.

In 2023, The Hated reunited for Numero Group's Numero Twenty Festival, playing alongside other post-hardcore and emo bands picked up by Numero Group, such as Unwound, Codeine, and Everyone Asked About You. The original line-up of Fisher, Littleton, Meeder, and Bonner reunited. They were joined by John Irvine, Miggy Littleton, and Jason Fisher, the latter two being Daniel and Erik's brothers, respectively.

== Discography ==
=== Albums ===
- The Best Piece Of Shit Vol. 3 (1985, self-released)
- What Was Behind (1986, self-released)
- Every Song (1989, Vermin Scum)

=== EPs and singles ===
- No More We Cry (1985, Vermin Scum)
- Like The Days (1987, Vermin Scum)
- T.S Eliot/Summer Down (2024, Numero Group)

=== Compilations ===
- Awl (1992, Simple Machines)
- The Best Piece Of Shit Vol. 4 (2022, Numero Group)
- Flux (2024, Numero Group)
