= Half-Cocked (film) =

1994 film directed by Suki Hawley

- Directed by: Suki Hawley
- Written by: Suki Hawley; Michael Galinsky
- Starring: Tara Jane O'Neil; Cynthia Nelson
- Release date: 1994
- Running time: 90 minutes
- Country: United States
- Language: English

Half-Cocked is a cult music road movie, made in 1994 in Louisville, Nashville and Chattanooga. The movie tells the story of a group of high school teens who steal a van full of music equipment and pretend to be a band, called "Truckstop" (played by the band Rodan) in order to stay on the road. When the band starts playing gigs, their sound is largely inconsistent and incoherent, however, over time, the band becomes increasingly competent in their musicianship. The film puts much emphasis on the indie/alternative rock subculture.

Many notable indie rock bands, such as Rodan, Polvo, Grifters, Freakwater, Versus, Slant 6, Unwound, Helium, Sleepyhead, Crain, and Ruby Falls are featured in the movie. Members of Rodan and Grifters play in the movie as well as acting. It had a small run on VHS and was unavailable for years until its 2007 re-release on DVD. A soundtrack of the movie appeared on Matador Records.

== Synopsis ==
Tara Jane O'Neil is growing weary of her life at the Rocket House, a party pad filled with crashing slackers, artists, and rock bands. She works as a ticket taker at a movie theatre and hangs out with a group of friends who are equally aimless, skateboarding through the streets of Louisville, KY, and just generally waiting for their lives to start. Her brother, Otis (Ian Svenonius), is the arrogant lead singer of a local rock group called the Guilloteens (played by other members of Svenonius' band, Make-Up). One night, after Otis smacks Tara in the face for '[fucking] up [his] encore' during a gig, Tara convinces her pals to hijack the Guilloteens' van (still full of equipment) as revenge, and head off into the night. The next morning, they find themselves in Chattanooga without money or food, so they pose as a touring rock band called Truckstop. Upon entering a record store, they meet the owner, Moses, and talk their way onto the bill of a local punk show. Despite being utterly unfamiliar with the instruments in their hands, they pull off the ruse, and the band they play with, Boondoggle (the band of later June of 44 guitarist Sean Meadows), are in awe of their noisy, chaotic sound. Even after their secret is revealed, their hosts give them encouragement and tutoring to allow Truckstop to continue on the road. What starts as a romantic adventure, though, degenerates into bickering, bad luck, and boredom. Eventually, the band members reconcile with one another and play a show with Grifters, now as a refined and functional band. Their sound, though full of dissonance, now has a sense of melody and structure. Unfortunately, Otis is informed of Tara's whereabouts and sends the police after her. The police catch Tara and she is arrested, in an anticlimactic fashion.

== Cast ==
- James Canty
- Jon Cook, as Elliot
- Steve Gamboa
- Sean Meadows as Himself
- John Moses, as Moses
- Jeff Mueller, as Himself
- Cynthia Nelson, as Herself
- Jason Noble, as Himself
- Tara Jane O'Neil as Herself, credited as "Rhonda"
- Ian Svenonius as Otis
- The Grifters
- Christina Casey as Herself
