= The Naysayer =

American country-rock band

- Genres: Country rock, indie pop
- Years active: 2000–2006
- Labels: Carrot Top Records, Red Panda Records
- Members: Anna Padgett, Tara Jane O'Neil
- Past members: Cynthia Nelson

The Naysayer was a country-rock band founded in 2000 by singer-songwriter Anna Padgett, the band's only permanent member, and former Retsin drummer Cynthia Nelson. The band released four studio albums before disbanding in 2006.

== History ==
Padgett and Nelson first met at Wesleyan University, where Padgett was studying dance art history, in the early 1990s. Post-graduation they became close friends when they started working at the same restaurant in New York City. After Padgett moved to Los Angeles, she later reunited with Nelson in New York, where they began practicing with each other. The Naysayer later arose from their collaborations despite their lack of intention of starting a band. The Naysayer released their debut album, Deathwhisker, in 2000 on Carrot Top Records; Tara Jane O'Neil joined the group to work on the album. They released their second album, Heaven, Hell, or Houston, in 2002, which introduced a bigger sound than was present on their debut album. In 2003, they released the five-track EP Pure Beauty. They have released two full-length albums since then: Kitten Time (2004) and Smoke Reality (2006), both of which were released on Red Panda Records. In 2006, Padgett gave birth to her first child, after which she disbanded the Naysayer and began recording children's music as The Good Ms. Padgett.

== Critical reception ==
Franklin Bruno wrote in CMJ that Pure Beauty "filters [Padgett's] sensibility through country music's formal and narrative conventions even more completely than Heaven, Hell, or Houston, with mixed results." Robert Christgau was more favorable, describing the five songs on the EP as "quietly outrageous" and "wickedly funny". In his review of their album Kitten Time, Bill Adams of Exclaim! wrote that "How well Kitten Time works depends entirely upon how far you're willing to wait; but for the patient, it's unlikely that a smarter songwriter exists in independent music right now." Jeremy Schneyer of PopMatters wrote that Heaven, Hell or Houston was "a fairly simple and unassuming collection of songs on the surface," but that despite this, "in the end, [it] has a great deal more to offer than immediate gratification." Brad Filicky of CMJ New Music Report described the music on this album as "mature but dark music that would supply perfect accompaniment to a southern Gothic story." The Illinois Times' René Spencer Saller reviewed Kitten Time favorably, noting that it featured more musicians than the Naysayer's previous albums. In the same review, she wrote that "the new guests don't ruin its understated charm; like good little kittycats, they sidle up at just the right moment, confer their clear-eyed solace, and then slip away in a silken swish."

== Discography ==
=== Studio albums ===
- Deathwhisker (Carrot Top, 2000)
- Heaven, Hell, or Houston (Carrot Top, 2002)
- Kitten Time (Red Panda, 2004)
- Smoke Reality (Red Panda, 2006)

=== EPs ===
- Pure Beauty (Carrot Top, 2003)
