= Mark Andersen =

American activist

Mark Andersen is a punk rock community activist and author who lives in Washington D.C. He was born and raised in rural Montana, and moved to Washington D.C. in 1984 to attend graduate school at the Johns Hopkins School of Advanced International Studies (SAIS).

Andersen co-founded the punk activist organization Positive Force D.C. in 1985, and the We Are Family Senior Outreach Network in 2004. Together with his wife, Tulin Ozdeger, he is the co-director of We Are Family, which serves low-income seniors in the Shaw, North Capitol Street and Columbia Heights neighborhoods of Washington, D.C.

He has contributed to several other books including Sober Living For the Revolution: Hardcore, Radical Politics, and Straight Edge (2010), We Owe You Nothing: Punk Planet, the Collected Interviews (Expanded Edition) (2008), Rad Dad: Dispatches From the Frontiers of Fatherhood (2011), and Rock Politics: Popular Musicians Who Changed the World (2012).

Andersen donated his archives to the Martin Luther King Jr. Memorial Library in 2015.

== Works ==
- Dance of Days: Two Decades of Punk in the Nation's Capitol (Soft Skull Press, 2001), ISBN 9781933354996
- All The Power: Revolution Without Illusion Punk Planet Books, (2004), ISBN 9781888451726
- We are the Clash: Reagan, Thatcher, and the Last Stand of a Band that Mattered. Akashic Books, Brooklyn, New York, 2018. ISBN 9781617752933
