= Retsin =

American indie rock band

Retsin was an American indie rock band founded by Tara Jane O'Neil and Cynthia Nelson.

== History ==
Retsin was founded in 1993 by O'Neil, who had played with Rodan, and Nelson, a member of Ruby Falls. The two continued to work with other groups (Nelson with Ruby Falls, O'Neil in the group The Sonora Pine) while they collaborated as Retsin, and their relationship became romantic as well as musical. Their debut appeared in 1995, after they had appeared in the film Half-Cocked; the pair toured extensively behind the album, sometimes adding a rhythm section in live shows.

After playing live with Ida, the two groups did a recording together called Ida Retsin Family. Retsin's label, Simple Machines Records, went out of business in 1998, and they signed with Carrot Top Records for their next two full-lengths, the last of which appeared in 2001. Both O'Neil and Nelson joined Anna Padgett in Naysayer, recording two albums in 2001 and 2002.

== Discography ==
- Salt Lick (Simple Machines Records, 1995)
- Egg Fusion (Simple Machines Records, 1996)
- Sweet Luck Of Amaryllis (Carrot Top Records, 1998)
- Cabin In The Woods (Carrot Top Records, 2001)
- Moon Money Moon EP (Acuarela Discos, 2001)

=== Collaborations ===
- The Ida Retsin Family Volume One (Muss My Hair Records, 1998) (collaboration with Ida)
