= Tsunami (Virginia band) =

American indie rock band

- Origin: Arlington, Virginia
- Genres: Alternative rock, indie rock
- Years active: 1990-1998, 2001-2003, 2023-present
- Labels: Simple Machines, Numero
- Members: Jenny Toomey; Kristin Thomson; Luther Gray; Rob Christiansen; Franklin Bruno
- Past members: Amy Domingues; Bob Massey; Andrew Webster; John Pamer
- Website: Tsunami

Tsunami is an American indie rock band from Arlington, Virginia, formed by housemates Jenny Toomey and Kristin Thomson in late 1990 to play at New Year's party. They enlisted former housemate John Pamer to play drums and Andrew Webster from Bricks and Jenny's previous band Geek to complete the line up.

== Early Days ==
Following their inception, Tsunami split their time between touring, recording various 7-inch singles and devoting time to Toomey and Thomson's Simple Machines record label- from which Tsunami would release the majority of their own music. The band recorded their debut album, Deep End during the summer of 1992. However, due to manufacturing and mixing problems this was not released until early 1993. It was then that the band were invited to play the side stage at Lollapalooza, going on to play six shows with Sebadoh, Free Kitten and Thurston Moore. After the release of the band's second album The Heart's Tremolo, Tsunami completed two tours of the US, a tour of England, and an appearance at the Phoenix Festival on the Melody Maker Stage.

In 1995, Tsunami continued to tour the States and also managed to release their third album World Tour & Other Destinations. The band subsequently had an official one-year hiatus whilst John attended UMASS Amherst to complete his undergraduate degree.

== Fresh Faces ==
Following his graduation in 1996, Pamer decided to stay in Amherst in order to save up so he could move to New York City. With this in mind, Tsunami enlisted the services of another Arlington drummer, Luther Gray. Having practiced with Gray for six months, the band recorded their fourth album at the Kingsize Soundlabs in Chicago. The result, A Brilliant Mistake, was released in August 1997 on Simple Machines. The band embarked on another US tour to promote the album, taking on new members, Amy Domingues (bass) and Bob Massey (guitar and keyboards).

== Simple Machines ==
In 1998, Toomey and Thomson took the decision to call time on the Simple Machines record label and the band. The event was marked by the 'Simple Machines Finale party' at which the band performed. Whilst the end of the record label also marked the end of musical releases from Tsunami, they subsequently fulfilled a short East Coast tour in the same year. Toomey and Thomson joined up for two sets between 2001 and 2003 with a mixture of former members and guest musicians to perform at the Ladyfest festivals in Washington, D.C. and Philadelphia

Simple Machines had their own clothing line called Cog Wear, which sported their logo on different clothing items. Simple Machines ceased operations in 1997.

== After Simple Machines ==
After Simple Machines was wound up in 1998, Toomey and Thomson co-founded the Future of Music Coalition whose aim is "to ensure that musicians have a voice in the issues that affect their livelihood" through advocacy intended to establish a "balanced approach to music in the digital age — one that reflects the interests of all stakeholders, and not just the powerful few".

Toomey went on to become the executive director, and Thomson became Education Director for the organization after completing a Masters in Urban Affairs and Public Policy from the University of Delaware.

Tsunami reformed in 2023 after reissues of their music though The Numero Group. 2024 saw the release of Loud Is As, a box set compiling the band's four albums. Loud Is As was included on lists of the best box sets and reissues for 2024 by both The New York Times and Billboard Magazine. It also received a nomination for Best Recording Package at the 2026 Grammy awards, losing to Bruce Springsteen's Tracks II: The Lost Albums.

== Members ==
=== Kristin Thomson ===
Kristin Thomson left a position at the National Organization of Women in 1990 to co-lead the Simple Machines record label. She ran the label with partner Jenny Toomey until its closure in 1997. Simple Machines was the first self-made label in D.C. to be run by women. The label was initially based out of the Positive Force House in Arlington, but eventually relocated to another home in Arlington.

Thomson and Toomey published four editions of the Simple Machine's Mechanics Guide, a booklet that attempted to demystify the process of giving music a physical form and helped aspiring artists learn how to release their records as cassettes, CDs, or any other physical form that was prominent at the time. The booklet sold over 2000 copies, which correlated with the significant uptick in the quantity of new, small record labels in the area.

Throughout her time working with Simple Machines, Thomson helped to organize female-oriented events and workshops with the other female characters and figures in the D.C. Punk scene. These events spread awareness about several different issues, and made a significant impact on the lives of thousands of women as well as the D.C. Punk scene as a whole.

In the mid 2000s, Thomson was the nonprofit education, project, and research director for the Future of Music Coalition. In 2017, she became a director at the nonprofit Media Democracy Fund. She lives in Philadelphia and was married to the concert promoter, Bryan Dilworth, from 1995 until his death from a pulmonary embolism on March 9, 2020. Thomson and Dilworth's son, Riley Dilworth, was born in 2002.

== Discography ==
=== Singles ===
- "Headringer" (Simple Machines, 1991)
- "Genius of Crack" (Homestead Records, 1991)
- "Teriyaki Asthma vol.7" (C/Z Records, 1992)
- "Beautiful Arlington" (IV (Australia), 1992)
- "Diner" (Simple Machines, 1993)
- "Matchbook" (Simple Machines, 1993)
- "Be Like That" (Simple Machines, 1994)
- "Poodle/Old City" (Simple Machines, 1997)

=== Albums ===
- Deep End (Simple Machines, 1993)
- The Heart's Tremolo (Simple Machines, 1994)
- World Tour & Other Destinations (Simple Machines, 1995)
- A Brilliant Mistake (Simple Machines, 1997)
- Loud Is As (Numero, 2024)

=== Compilation appearances ===
- Tsunami/Velocity Girl split 7-inch (Sub Pop, 1992)
- Season's Greetings split 7-inch w/ Velocity Girl (Simple Machines, 1992)
- Inclined Plane comp 7-inch (Simple Machines, 1993)
- Teen Beat 100 comp 7-inch (TeenBeat Records, 1993)
- August Working Holiday split 7-inch w/Small Factory (Simple Machines, 1993)
- Echoes from the Nation's Capital comp CD/CS (TWUnderground, 1993)
- The Machines: Simple Machines 7-inchs (1990-1993) comp. (Simple Machines - SMR 19, 1994)
- Monsters of Rock II CDw/Eggs & Rodan (Simple Machines, 1994)
- Working Holiday! Compilation Album (Simple Machines, 1994)
- "Our Band Could Be Your Life" Minuteman tribute comp LP/CD (Little Brother, 1995)
- Tsunami/Superchunk split 7-inch (Honeybear, 1995)
- Compulsiv comp No. 3 7-inch (Compulsiv Records, 1996)
