= Heart Like a River =

Studio album by Ida
- Released: February 22, 2005
- Recorded: August 2003 – April 2004
- Genre: Indie rock, indie folk, Baroque pop, acoustic, dream pop
- Label: Polyvinyl Records
- Producer: Warren Defever and Ida

Ida chronology
The Braille Night (2001)	Heart Like a River (2005)	Lovers Prayers (2008)

Heart Like a River is the sixth studio album by American indie rock duo Ida, released in 2005 on Polyvinyl Records.

== Reception ==
Professional ratings
Aggregate scores
Source	Rating
Metacritic	(71/100)
Review scores
Source	Rating
AllMusic	4/5 stars
Entertainment Weekly	(favorable)
LAS Magazine	(9/10)
Pitchfork Media	(6.4/10)
PopMatters	(8/10)
Trouser Press	(favorable)

Critical reception for Heart Like a River varied from mildly favorable to very favorable, but all agreed that it was of a piece with their previous work. The album "...brings serene harmonies to songs about longtime love as well as romances that don't go so smoothly," according to Jon Pareles, writing in The New York Times.

== Track listing ==
All tracks written by Littleton/Mitchell, except "What Can I Do" and "Honeyslide" by Karla Schickele.

1. "Laurel Blues" – 4:50
2. "599" – 5:29
3. "Late Blues" – 5:24
4. "Mine" – 5:31
5. "What Can I Do" – 2:57
6. "The Details" – 4:38
7. "Sundown" – 6:42
8. "Honeyslide" – 3:37
9. "Written on My Face" – 3:50
10. "The Morning" – 7:31
11. "Forgive" – 7:31

== Personnel ==
- Daniel Littleton – guitar, harmonium, organ, viola, drums, vocals
- Elizabeth Mitchell – guitar, harmonium, accordion, wurlitzer, vocals
- Karla Schickele – bass, piano, bell, vocals
- Luther Gray – drums, percussion, clarinet
- Jean Cook – violin
- Cecilia Littleton – viola
- Rick Lassiter – double bass
- Dominique Davison – cello
- Andrew Hall – double bass
