= Nan Warshaw =

- Born: Nancy R. Warshaw; November 2, 1962 (age 63)
- Occupations: Co-Founder, Bloodshot Records
- Years active: 1985-present
- Partner: Mark Panick
- Children: 1

Nan Warshaw (born November 2, 1962) is the co-founder of Bloodshot Records, an independent record label based out of Chicago.

== Early life and education ==
Warshaw grew up in the Old Town neighborhood of Chicago as well as Evanston, Illinois.

In 1985, Warshaw graduated from Evergreen State in Olympia, Washington. In 1993, she received a master's degree in Business and Entrepreneurship from Columbia College Chicago.

== Career ==
Warshaw started Bloodshot Records in 1993 with co-founders Rob Miller and Eric Babcock as a hobby that they ran out of her apartment in the Wrigleyville neighborhood of Chicago. They were trying to shine a light on some of the unheralded music they were listening to and seeing in the local Chicago clubs at the time. As of early 2019, Warshaw resigned from Bloodshot, and, as of late 2020, she and remaining co-owner Miller remained in active litigation.

In addition to her work at the label, Warshaw is involved in healthcare reform activism. In 2006, she helped to organize benefits to support Fitzgerald's sound engineer Gary Schepers cover healthcare related expenses.

She was the small business owner representative for Illinois on the White House website for health care reform under President Barack Obama. She was an active supporter of the Affordable Care Act.

== Personal life ==
In 2000, Warshaw married Christian "Tex" Schmidt, who was in the German band the Roughnecks. They have a son. The marriage ended in divorce. Warshaw long-term partner is Mark Panick, a musician from the bands The Bonemen of Barumba and Razorhouse.

== Awards ==
- 2014: Chicago Tribune, Chicagoans of the Year
- 2015: Columbia College Chicago, Honorary PhD
- 2015: Chicago Reader, Best Local Record Label

== Works and publications ==
- Warshaw, Nan (15 March 2012). "I'm a small business owner covering health care for my employees". MomsRising's Blog.
- Warshaw, Nan (18 May 2015). Bloodshot Co-Founder/Co-Owner Nan Warshaw's Columbia College Commencement/Honorary Doctorate Speech (Transcript). Bloodshot Records.
- Warshaw, Nan (11 January 2016). "R.I.P. David Bowie - A Tribute". Bloodshot Records.

== See also ==
- Bloodshot Records
