= Jenny Toomey =

American musician and arts activist

- Born: Jennifer Gillen Toomey; 1968 (age 57–58)
- Occupations: Musician; Arts activist
- Website: JennyToomey.com

Jennifer Gillen Toomey (born 1968) is an American indie rock musician and arts activist.

== Career ==
Toomey was a member of the bands Geek, Tsunami, Liquorice, Grenadine, So Low and Choke, among others, and has also recorded under her own name.

In 1990, Toomey co-founded the Simple Machines record label with Geek and Choke band-mate Derek Denckla and a housemate Brad Sigal both of whom left the project over the next two years. Afterwards, Toomey ran the label with Tsunami bandmate Kristin Thomson from 1990 to 1998 out of several group houses in Arlington, Virginia. Along with TeenBeat Records and Dischord Records, Simple Machines helped document the D.C. punk and indie rock scenes. Tsunami was also greatly influential in the do it yourself (D.I.Y.) movement among the punk, grunge and indie communities. Among the artists released on Simple Machines are Tsunami, Grenadine, Franklin Bruno, Ida, Scrawl, Dave Grohl (recording under the name Late!) and Retsin, among others. Through Simple Machines, Toomey and Thomson released The Mechanic's Guide, a DIY music guidebook which was influential in the independent music scene of the 1990s.

In 2000, Toomey was one of four founders of the Future of Music Coalition, a Washington, D.C. think tank that translates the complex issues at the intersection of music, policy and law, aiming to help (primarily independent) musicians, including intellectual property rights, health insurance, and the effects of corporate consolidation of radio and the music industry. She was the founding executive director.

As part of her advocacy work, Toomey participated in many conferences, including the Future of the Music Industry forum held at Georgetown University in January 2003, among others.

In November 2007, she was appointed Program Officer for Media and Cultural Policy in the Media, Arts and Culture Unit at the Ford Foundation, where she would later serve as Director of Media Rights and Access, then the Director of Internet Freedom, after which she became the domestic and international Director for Technology and Society. In 2020 she became the Director of the Ford Foundation Catalyst fund, a 50 Million dollar investment in building the field of Public Interest Technology.

== Discography ==
with Choke

- Kingdom of Mattresses (1990)

with Geek

- Wedge (Various Artists) (1990)
- Three's Company (Various Artists) (1990)
- Screw (Various Artists) (1991)
- Hammer

with My New Boyfriend

- Pulley (Various Artists) (1991)
- Supersaw

with Slack

- Neapolitan Metropolitan (Various Artists) (1992)
- Bates Stamper

with Grenadine

- Goya (1992)
- Trilogy (1992)
- Don't Forget the Halo (1993)
- Nopalitos (1994)
- Christiansen (1994)

with Tsunami

- Deep End (1993)
- The Heart's Tremolo (1994)
- World Tour and Other Destinations (1995)
- A Brilliant Mistake (1997)
- Loud Is As (2024)

with Liquorice

- Stalls (1995)
- Listening Cap (1995)

=== Solo ===
- Antidote (2001)
- Tempting (2002)
