= Mascott =

- Origin: New York City, New York, United States
- Genres: Indie pop
- Years active: 1998 – present
- Labels: Le Grand Magistery; Red Panda Records
- Members: Kendall Jane Meade
- Website: http://www.mascottsongs.com Article title

Mascott is a U.S. indie-pop band based in New York City formed in 1998.

The indie pop group Mascott is led by singer/guitarist Kendall Jane Meade, formerly of Juicy. After that band disbanded in the wake of their 1996 album Olive Juicy, Meade relocated from New York City to her native Detroit to plot her next move; weeks later she was invited to play keyboards on Helium's UK tour, followed by a series of shows backing Rebecca Gates' Spinanes. She formed Mascott soon after, releasing their debut EP Electric Poems on Le Grand Magistery in late 1998. Three years later, she released the Jim O'Rourke produced Follow the Sound. Dreamer's Book was released on her own label, Red Panda, in early 2004.

Mascott released a 3rd full-length studio album entitled Art Project on November 11, 2008 on Red Panda Records.

== Discography ==
=== Albums ===
- Follow the Sound (Le Grand Magistery, 2000)
- Dreamer's Book (Red Panda, 2004)
- Art Project (Red Panda, 2008)

=== EPs ===
- Electric Poems (Le Grand Magistery, 1998)
- This Is Next Year: A Brooklyn-Based Compilation (featuring "Blizzard of '77") - Arena Rock Recording Co. - 2001
