= Positive Force =

American activist organization

Positive Force DC is an activist organization founded in 1985 by members of the punk community in Washington, D.C. It has organized hundreds of benefit concerts for community and activist groups, and worked alongside Fugazi, Bikini Kill, Nation of Ulysses, Girls Against Boys, Q and Not U and other bands arising from the capital’s punk scene. Positive Force has also engaged in many other forms of progressive activism in the D.C. area, and from about 1985 to the mid-1990s there was a Positive Force house in Arlington, Virginia, where various members of the group lived and which the organization operated from.

== Founding ==
The original "Positive Force" group started in 1984 in Reno, Nevada, with people in and around the band 7 Seconds. The phrase is linked to Gandhi's Satyagraha सत्याग्रह; satya: "truth", āgraha: "insistence" or "holding firmly to." Several members of Reno Positive Force moved to Las Vegas and started a chapter there later that year. The idea spread across the United States following the March 1985 publication of an article in Maximum RocknRoll. Positive Force came together in Washington, D.C., in summer 1985 – Revolution Summer, influenced by the straight edge movement, according to Dance of Days, a book on the history of D.C. punk by Positive Force DC co-founder Mark Andersen and Mark Jenkins. While up to a dozen chapters existed at one point or another, the Washington, D.C. group is the only one to survive the 1980s. It continues to operate today.

== Documentaries ==
In 1991, University of Maryland student David M. Weinstein created a documentary called "Wake Up! A Profile of Positive Force" as both a 9-minute and a 28-minute film. He described it as: "A documentary about Positive Force, a loosely organized group of young people working for social change. P.F. members volunteer in the Washington, D.C. community and promote benefit rock concerts for a wide variety of groups. They also try to live according to a set of humane values." The 9-minute short was a 1992 nominee at the Rosebud Film & Video Festival in Arlington, Virginia.

Positive Force is also featured in the 2011 documentary Positive Force: More Than a Witness: 25 Years of Punk Politics In Action by Robin Bell.

== Work ==
As of January 2000, Positive Force DC had organized nearly 300 benefit concerts that raised more than $200,000 for organizations that work to help residents of Washington, D.C., meet their basic needs or to produce "progressive/revolutionary change," according to the group’s Web site.

Positive Force and its members have volunteered on behalf of organizations in the capital, and have organized and participated in protests against government policy at the local, national and international levels.

Andersen compiled the State of the Union album, which featured 16 Washington, D.C. bands and was issued in 1989 by Dischord Records to raise funds for the American Civil Liberties Union and the Community for Creative Nonviolence, according to Dischord.

Through much of its history, Positive Force offered communal meeting and living space for like-minded groups and individuals. The group provided significant financial support for the Flemming Center, which houses the Positive Force office and several other progressive organizations in Washington, D.C.

Positive Force organized the All Our Power conference, which occurred from October 6 to 8, 2006, in Washington, D.C. The aim of the conference was to include speakers, panel discussions and workshops offering people within the punk community with information on a range of options for activism. Additional conferences are planned for Chicago and San Francisco, according to the All Our Power Web site. As a follow-up to the conference, the group in 2007 is organizing monthly benefit concerts in Washington, D.C., for local community and activist organizations.

== See also ==
- Brian MacKenzie Infoshop
- Washington, D.C. hardcore (harDCore)
- Revolution Summer
- St. Stephen and the Incarnation Episcopal Church
