= Tiger Style Records =

American independent record label

Tiger Style Records is an independent record label located in New York City, New York. It is owned and operated by Insound. As of 2004, it is on hiatus. In 2024, the label entered a partnership with The Numero Group to reboot their operations and reissue their catalogue.

== Roster ==
- 764-HERO
- The Album Leaf
- American Analog Set
- The Appleseed Cast
- Aspera Ad Astra
- Broken Spindles
- Convocation of...
- Dead Low Tide
- Her Space Holiday
- Entrance
- Ida
- James Chance
- Karla Schickele
- Libraness
- The Letter E
- The Lilys
- Low
- Lo-Hi
- Lucero
- The Mercury Program
- Nanang Tatang
- Rye Coalition
- Speedking
- Tristeza
- Those Peabodys

== See also ==
- List of record labels
