= Simple Machines =

American independent record label

- Founded: 1990
- Founder: Jenny Toomey, Brad Sigal, Derek Denckla
- Defunct: March 29, 1997
- Status: Dormant
- Genre: Various
- Country of origin: United States
- Location: Arlington, Virginia
- Official website: Official website

Simple Machines was an American independent record label in Arlington, Virginia. The label was founded by Derek Denckla and Jenny Toomey and Brad Sigal while both were living in the Positive Force House in north Arlington, but Sigal and eventually Denckla stepped back from involvement. In 1990-91 Kristin Thomson stepped up and co-masterminded the project with Toomey and they started a new group house near Positive Force's. At its peak, the label was run by Toomey, Thomson, Pat Graham and Mickey Menard. The label was formed to "find creative ways to avoid the established and boring music business."

== Biography ==
The label came into existence in 1989 working toward the 1990 release of the Simple Machines 7" series. The Working Holiday! 7" series followed. Simple Machines promoted cooperation with other indie labels all over the United States, and the "sell it at a fair price" ethic. The label also released a compilation of bands covering their "favorite Beat Happening covers". The profits were donated to a youth at risk home in Washington D.C.

One of the most famous releases of the label is Pocketwatch, an album recorded by Dave Grohl, the Foo Fighters frontman, who was at the time the drummer for Seattle-based grunge band Nirvana. Hesitant to use his own name on the record, Grohl used the moniker "Late!", and was listed in liner notes as "Dave G".

Inspired by the International Pop Underground Convention, Simple Machines organized, with the help of local labels TeenBeat and Slumberland, the Lotsa Pop Losers festival in October 1991. The festival featured performances by such bands as Velocity Girl, Versus, Unrest, Edsel, and Lilys.

== The Mechanic's Guide ==
As part of the label's DIY attitude towards the music industry, they published a 24-page guide that is believed to be responsible for helping to set up many independent labels throughout the 1990s. The guide gives detailed advice on many aspects of the music industry from recording and releasing singles through to the legal requirements of setting up a label as a legitimate business.

== Closure ==
Following Thomson's relocation to Philadelphia with her husband, and the subsequent six-hour weekly commute, Simple Machines found themselves under increasing financial pressures to keep putting out records and keeping them in print. Toomey and Thomson had also become disenchanted with the business aspect of their label, realizing that it overruled the musical side of it. In 1997 the decision was made to wind the label down.

The label released two final records by artists Ida and Tsunami, respectively. Toomey and Thomson organized a Simple Machines Finale, "Kick the Bucket" Party at the Black Cat in Washington D.C., with 24 bands on the bill which took two days to conclude. On March 29, 1997, Simple Machines closed.

== Current ==
In 2024, Chicago archival label The Numero Group began reissuing projects originally released on Simple Machines including compilations from The Hated, Ida, and the co-founder's band Tsunami.

== Roster ==
- Autoclave
- Bricks
- Franklin Bruno
- Grenadine
- Dave Grohl (under the pseudonym "Late!")
- The Hated
- Danielle Howle
- Ida
- Liquorice
- Lois
- Lungfish
- Mommyheads
- Monorchid
- My Dad Is Dead
- Rastro!
- The Raymond Brake
- Retsin
- Scrawl
- Sea Saw
- Tsunami

== See Also ==
- Simple Machines discography
