= The Gladiator Nightstick Collection =

Compilation album by of Montreal
- Released: 2004
- Genre: Indie pop
- Label: Devil in the Woods

Of Montreal chronology
Satanic Panic in the Attic (2004)	The Gladiator Nightstick Collection (2004)	The Sunlandic Twins (2005)

The Gladiator Nightstick Collection is a vinyl-only greatest hits collection from the Athens-based group of Montreal. It was released exclusively on Devil in the Woods records in 2004, and included the never-before-released track "Ah, My Kitten," later released as "Keep Sending Me Black Fireworks" on the Sunlandic Twins bonus EP. Brackets denote album upon which song made original appearance.

== Track listing ==
Side A

1. "Spike the Senses" (Satanic Panic in the Attic)
2. "On the Drive Home" (The Bird Who Continues to Eat the Rabbit's Flower)
3. "My Favorite Boxer" (The Gay Parade)
4. "Let's Do Everything For the First Time Forever" (Coquelicot Asleep in the Poppies: A Variety of Whimsical Verse)
5. "Pancakes For One" (Aldhils Arboretum)
6. "Lysergic Bliss" (Satanic Panic in the Attic)

Side B

1. "Happy Yellow Bumblebee" (The Bedside Drama: A Petite Tragedy)
2. "Sleeping in the Beetle Bug" (Cherry Peel)
3. "Old Familiar Way" (The Gay Parade)
4. "Was Your Face a Head in the Pillowcase?" (Horse & Elephant Eatery (No Elephants Allowed): The Singles and Songles Album)
5. "Rose Robert" (Coquelicot Asleep in the Poppies: A Variety of Whimsical Verse)
6. "The Problem With April" (Horse & Elephant Eatery (No Elephants Allowed): The Singles and Songles Album)
7. "Ah, My Kitten"
