= An Introduction to Of Montreal =

An Introduction to of Montreal

Compilation album by of Montreal
- Released: 2001
- Genre: Indie rock
- Label: Earworm
- Producer: Kevin Barnes

Of Montreal chronology
Coquelicot Asleep in the Poppies: A Variety of Whimsical Verse (2001)	An Introduction to of Montreal (2001)	Aldhils Arboretum (2002)

Professional ratings
Review scores
Source	Rating
The Encyclopedia of Popular Music	3/5 stars

An Introduction to of Montreal is a special-edition vinyl record album by indie rock band of Montreal released on the Earworm record label.

== Track listing ==
Side A

1. "Don't Ask Me to Explain" (Cherry Peel)
2. "Baby" (Cherry Peel)
3. "Everything Disappears When You Come Around" (Cherry Peel)
4. "I Can't Stop Your Memory" (Cherry Peel)
5. "You Are an Airplane" (The Bird Who Ate the Rabbit's Flower)
6. "If I Faltered Slightly Twice" (The Bird Who Ate the Rabbit's Flower)
7. "Little Viola Hidden in the Orchestra" (The Bedside Drama: A Petite Tragedy)
8. "Panda Bear" (The Bedside Drama: A Petite Tragedy)

Side B

1. "Sing You a Love You Song" (The Bedside Drama: A Petite Tragedy)
2. "Easy to Sleep When Your Dead" (The Bedside Drama: A Petite Tragedy)
3. "The Miniature Philosopher" (The Gay Parade)
4. "A Man's Life Flashing Before His Eyes While He and His Wife Drive Off a Cliff" (The Gay Parade)
5. "Jacques Lamure" (The Gay Parade)
6. "A Collection of Poems About Water" (The Gay Parade)
7. "Nickee Coco and the Invisible Tree" (The Gay Parade)
8. "Cast in the Haze"
