= The Bird Who Continues to Eat the Rabbit's Flower =

EP by Of Montreal
- Released: 21 August 1999
- Recorded: 1997–1999
- Genre: Indie pop
- Length: 25:58
- Label: Kindercore Records

Of Montreal chronology
| Cherry Peel (1997) | The Bird Who Continues to Eat the Rabbit's Flower (1999) | The Bedside Drama: A Petite Tragedy (1998) |

Professional ratings
Review scores
| Source | Rating |
|---|---|
| Allmusic | 3/5 stars |
| Pitchfork Media | 7.5/10 |

The Bird Who Continues to Eat the Rabbit's Flower is a release by the Elephant 6 band Of Montreal. It is an extended version of their EP The Bird Who Ate the Rabbit's Flower; the first five tracks are the ones from that first effort.

== Background ==
Initially a short run five-song EP, The Bird Who Ate the Rabbit's Flower went out of print. The songs were recorded at the same time as the songs that made The Bedside Drama: A Petite Tragedy and The Gay Parade, but not fitting either of their styles. These EPs and further albums were released via Kindercore, as opposed to Bar/None Records due to the volume of material Kevin Barnes was making. Bar/None wanted to wait to release more, so Kevin signed a deal with local Athens, Georgia label Kindercore to get all of it out.

"You Are An Airplane" was written about Kevin's best friend Niquelin, who they lived with at the time, not wanting her to get into cocaine.

"The Inner Light" is about a Christian girl Kevin meets who they are surprised to learn is very compassionate and loving.

"When a Man Is in Love with a Man" details Kevin questioning their sexuality after seeing their friends in healthy homosexual relationships.

"If I Faltered Slightly Twice" is a song about Kevin's failed relationship with the band's namesake girl from Montreal, Julie. Kevin drove to Montreal to see her, it went very poorly, and she kicked them out. They later wrote the song at their sister's house.

"Disguises" is a The Who cover.

"On the Drive Home" is another song about Julie, detailing Kevin driving home after the experience. They had bought a cherry cola, as mentioned in the song, then had broken down in their car. They had been speeding, and a cop stopped them. Realizing they were in deep distress, he let them go.

"The Secret Ocean" is an Elf Power cover, an Elephant 6 band that Kevin had collaborated with at the time.

"I Felt Like Smashing My Face Through a Clear Glass Window" is a Yoko Ono cover. Yoko later mailed Kevin a postcard informing them she heard the cover via her son Sean and enjoyed it.

== Track listing ==
All songs by Kevin Barnes except where noted.

1. "You Are an Airplane" – 4:24
2. "The Inner Light" – 3:23
3. "When a Man Is in Love with a Man" – 2:21
4. "If I Faltered Slightly Twice" – 2:27
5. "Disguises" (Pete Townshend) – 4:08
6. "On the Drive Home" – 2:51
7. "The Secret Ocean" (Andrew Rieger) – 3:03
8. "I Felt Like Smashing My Face Through a Clear Glass Window" (Yoko Ono) – 4:01
9. "Christmas Is Only Good If You're a Boy (Girl)" (Japanese bonus track) – 2:04
10. "My Favorite Christmas (In a Hundred Words or Less)" (Japanese bonus track) 2:53
