= Sing Along with Los Straitjackets =

Studio album by Los Straitjackets
- Released: September 25, 2001
- Genres: Instrumental rock, surf rock, garage rock, rock and roll
- Label: Yep Roc
- Producers: R. S. Field, Mark Linett, Los Straitjackets

Los Straitjackets chronology
Damas y Caballeros! (2001)	Sing Along with Los Straitjackets (2001)	Encyclopedia of Sound (2001)

Professional ratings
Review scores
Source	Rating
AllMusic	4/5 stars
Pitchfork	7.2/10

Sing Along with Los Straitjackets is the fourth studio album by American instrumental rock band Los Straitjackets. It was released on September 25, 2001, by Yep Roc Records.

Contrary to their instrumental work of previous and subsequent years, Sing Along with... contains vocal contributions from singers on thirteen cover versions, including Big Sandy (of Big Sandy & His Fly-Rite Boys), Raul Malo (of The Mavericks) and Mike Campbell (of Tom Petty and the Heartbreakers).

== Track listing ==
No.	Title	Writer(s)	Featured vocalist(s)	Length
1.	"Black Is Black" (Los Bravos cover)	Michelle Grainger, Tony Hayes, Steve Wadey	Raul Malo	3:13
2.	"Chica Alborotada/Tallahassee Lassie" (Freddy Cannon cover)	Freddy Cannon, Bob Crewe, Frank Slay	Big Sandy	1:56
3.	"Treat Her Right" (Roy Head & the Traits cover)	Roy Head, Gene Kurtz	Mark Lindsay	2:47
4.	"I Ain't the One" (Jessi Colter and Waylon Jennings cover)	Jessi Colter	Alison Moorer and Lonesome Bob	3:03
5.	"Down the Line" (Roy Orbison cover)	Roy Orbison, Sam Phillips	The Reverend Horton Heat	2:15
6.	"Rey Criollo/King Creole" (Elvis Presley cover)	Jerry Leiber, Mike Stoller	El Vez	2:08
7.	"California Sun" (Joe Jones cover)	Henry Glover, Morris Levy	Dave Alvin	2:33
8.	"I'll Go Down Swinging" (Bill Anderson cover)	Bill Anderson, Johnny Bienstock	Exene Cervenka	2:13
9.	"La Suegra/Mother in Law" (Allen Toussaint cover)	Allen Toussaint	Big Sandy	2:28
10.	"Bumble Bee" (LaVern Baker cover)	Eddie Fullylove	Mike Campbell	2:47
11.	"Shake That Rat" (Nick Lowe cover)	Nick Lowe	None ... but Nick Lowe plays "lead bass"	2:30
12.	"The End of the World" (Skeeter Davis cover)	Sylvia Dee, Arthur Kent	Leigh Nash	3:54
13.	"A Huevo" (Lost Acapulco cover)	Lost Acapulco	The Trashmen	2:10

== Personnel ==
Los Straitjackets

- Danny Amis – guitar, production
- Eddie Angel – guitar, production
- Pete Curry – bass, production
- Jimmy Lester – drums, percussion, production

Guest musicians

- Nick Lowe – bass on "Shake That Rat"
- Mark Lindsay – saxophone on "Treat Her Right"
- Chris Carmichael – string section, string arrangement

Additional personnel

- R. S. Field – production
- Mark Linett – production, engineering, mastering
- Jake Guralnik – executive production
- Jim DeMain – engineering, mastering
- Johnny Bartlett – artwork, design
- Bill Crump – photography
