= The Velvet Touch of Los Straitjackets =

Studio album by Los Straitjackets
- Released: June 1999
- Recorded: September–December 1998
- Genre: Instrumental rock, surf rock, garage rock, rock and roll
- Label: Yep Roc; Cavalcade
- Producer: Ben Vaughn

Los Straitjackets chronology
¡Viva! Los Straitjackets (1996)	The Velvet Touch of Los Straitjackets (1999)	Damas y Caballeros (2001)

Professional ratings
Review scores
Source	Rating
AllMusic	4/5 stars

The Velvet Touch of Los Straitjackets is the third studio album by American instrumental rock band Los Straitjackets, released in 1999 by Yep Roc. It was recorded between September and December 1998, produced by Ben Vaughn, and engineered by Mark Linett.

== Critical reception ==
Exclaim! wrote that "this third disc is a short one, but it's long on value, blending equal parts Hi-Test surf music and gentle, tasteful ballads." The Pittsburgh Post-Gazette wrote that "the hooks are inventive, insistent and sometimes even funny." The Detroit Metro Times called the band's cover of "My Heart Will Go On" "delightfully absurd."

== Track listing ==
No.	Title	Music	Length
1.	"Kawanga!"	Eddie Angel	2:25
2.	"Rockula"	Danny Amis, Angel, Jimmy Lester	2:46
3.	"Close to Champaign"	Amis, Angel, Scott Esbeck, Lester	3:53
4.	"Hornet's Nest"	Amis, Angel, Lester	3:00
5.	"My Heart Will Go On" (Celine Dion cover)	James Horner, Will Jennings	4:29
6.	"Tempest"	Amis, Angel, Esbeck, Lester	3:22
7.	"Tijuana Boots"	Amis, Angel, Lester	2:51
8.	"Sing, Sing, Sing" (Benny Goodman cover)	Louis Prima	3:22
9.	"Tabouli"	Amis, Angel, Esbeck, Lester	3:39
10.	"Sterno"	Ben Vaughn	1:54
11.	"State Fair"	Amis, Angel, Lester	2:34
12.	"All That Glitters"	Amis, Angel, Lester	2:47

== Personnel ==
Los Straitjackets

- Danny Amis – guitar
- Eddie Angel – guitar
- Pete Curry – bass
- Scott Esbeck – bass
- Jimmy "L. J." Lester – drums

Guest musicians

- Jeff Sudakin – keyboards, orchestration, sound design
- Jay Mason – clarinet, saxophone
- Darrel Gardner – trumpet

Additional personnel

- Ben Vaughn – production
- Mark Linett – engineering
- Joe Gastwirt – mastering
- George Miller – artwork
