= Pink Hearts Yellow Moons =

Studio album by Dressy Bessy
- Released: 1999
- Genre: Pop, indie
- Label: Kindercore

Dressy Bessy chronology
Pink Hearts Yellow Moons (1999)	SoundGoRound (2002)

Pink Hearts Yellow Moons is the debut album from Denver quartet Dressy Bessy. The album was released on Kindercore Records in 1999.

The songs "Just Like Henry" and "If You Should Try to Kiss Her" were included on the soundtrack to the 1999 movie But I'm a Cheerleader.

== Critical reception ==
Professional ratings
Review scores
Source	Rating
AllMusic	4/5 stars
Pitchfork Media	4.8/10

The Stranger called the album "by far, the catchiest indie-pop record of 1999... With Pink Hearts, Yellow Moons, every day was summer." CMJ New Music Report deemed it "a candy dish full of light, sugary pop songs that beg you to add your own la-la background vocals." The Washington Post wrote that the songs "joyously reanimate the legacies of the Ronettes, the Archies and the Ramones."

== Track listing ==
All tracks are written by Tammy Ealom and Dressy Bessy, except where noted. All tracks are produced by John Hill with assistance from Dressy Bessy.

Pink Hearts Yellow Moons – standard edition
No.	Title	Length
1.	"I Found Out"	2:35
2.	"Just Like Henry"	2:27
3.	"Lookaround"	2:16
4.	"Little TV"	1:56
5.	"Jenny Come On"	2:44
6.	"If You Should Try to Kiss Her"	2:44
7.	"Extra-Ordinary"	2:41
8.	"Makeup"	2:21
9.	"Big Vacation" (written by Ealom, Martyn Leaper)	2:32
10.	"You Stand Here"	2:25
11.	"My Maryanne"	4:18

Pink Hearts Yellow Moons – Japan version (bonus tracks)
No.	Title	Length
12.	"All the Right Reasons"	2:42
13.	"Lipstick"	3:12
