= Aldhils Arboretum =

Studio album by of Montreal
- Released: September 24, 2002
- Recorded: 2001
- Genre: Indie pop
- Length: 40:47
- Label: Kindercore
- Producer: Kevin Barnes

Of Montreal chronology
An Introduction to Of Montreal (2001)	Aldhils Arboretum (2002)	If He Is Protecting Our Nation, Then Who Will Protect Big Oil, Our Children? (2003)

Professional ratings
Aggregate scores
Source	Rating
Metacritic	76/100
Review scores
Source	Rating
AllMusic	4/5 stars
Pitchfork Media	6.1/10
Rolling Stone	4/5 stars

Aldhils Arboretum is the fifth full-length album by the indie rock band of Montreal. It was intended to be a departure from their previous concept albums, The Gay Parade and Coquelicot Asleep in the Poppies: A Variety of Whimsical Verse. Instead of a unified theme, this album is a "singles" album of sorts, with each song being its own story alone.

== Track listing ==
All tracks are written by Kevin Barnes.

No.	Title	Length
1.	"Doing Nothing"	3:24
2.	"Old People in the Cemetery"	3:21
3.	"Isn't It Nice?"	2:56
4.	"Jennifer Louise"	2:01
5.	"The Blank Husband Epidemic"	2:40
6.	"Pancakes for One"	2:42
7.	"We Are Destroying the Song"	2:48
8.	"An Ode to the Nocturnal Muse"	3:44
9.	"Predictably Sulking Sara"	2:28
10.	"Natalie and Effie in the Park"	2:13
11.	"A Question for Emily Foreman"	2:43
12.	"Kissing in the Grass"	3:40
13.	"Kid Without Claws"	3:57
14.	"Death Dance of Omipapas and Sons for You"	2:24
Total length:		41:01
