= Satanic Twins =

Remix album by of Montreal
- Released: August 22, 2006
- Genre: Indie pop
- Length: 50:11
- Label: Polyvinyl

Of Montreal chronology
Deflated Chime, Foals Slightly Flower Sibylline Responses (2006)	Satanic Twins (2006)	Hissing Fauna, Are You the Destroyer? (2007)

Satanic Twins is a remix album by the band of Montreal. The album contains twelve remixes (six each) from their two previous full-length albums Satanic Panic in the Attic (2004) and The Sunlandic Twins (2005). The album was released as a double LP and digital download. "Satanic Twins" is a portmanteau of the names of the two albums from which its remixed songs originate. It was given a rating of six by PopMatters.

== Track listing ==
Satanic Panic in the Attic Remixes LP

1. "Disconnect the Dots (Mixel Pixel remix)" - 4:17
2. "How Lester Lost His Wife (Pocket remix)" - 3:32
3. "My British Tour Diary (Restiform Bodies (anticon.) remix)" - 4:00
4. "Climb the Ladder (Rory Phillips Trash UK remix)" - 5:34
5. "Chrissy Kiss the Corpse (Nils Lannon remix)" - 2:31
6. "Rapture Rapes the Muses (DJ Dave P. and Adam Sparkles Making Time remix)" - 6:25

The Sunlandic Twins Remixes LP

7. "Forecast Fascist Future (IQU remix)" - 4:56
8. "The Party's Crashing Us (I Am The World Trade Center remix)" - 3:54
9. "Wraith Pinned to the Mist and Other Games (Broken Spindles remix)" - 4:01
10. "I Was a Landscape in Your Dream (Grizzly Bear remix)" - 4:49
11. "Requiem for O.M.M.2 (United State of Electronica remix)" - 2:10
12. "I Was Never Young (Supersystem remix)" - 4:02

=== Bonus track on digital version ===
13. "My British Tour Diary (Caro Remix)" – 5:37
