= 'Tis the Season for Los Straitjackets! =

Studio album by Los Straitjackets
- Released: October 8, 2002
- Genre: Instrumental rock, surf rock, garage rock, rock and roll
- Label: Yep Roc
- Producer: Mark Linett

Los Straitjackets chronology
Encyclopedia of Sound (2001)	'Tis the Season for Los Straitjackets! (2002)	Supersonic Guitars in 3-D (2003)

Professional ratings
Review scores
Source	Rating
Allmusic	4/5 stars

'Tis the Season for Los Straitjackets! is the sixth studio album by American instrumental rock band Los Straitjackets, released on October 8, 2002 by Yep Roc Records. The album is a cover of traditional Christmas songs, and includes two original songs – "Christmas in Las Vegas" and "Christmas Weekend".

== Track listing ==
No.	Title	Writer(s)	Length
1.	"Here Comes Santa Claus"	Gene Autry, Oakley Haldeman	2:11
2.	"A Marshmallow World"	Peter DeRose, Carl Sigman	2:06
3.	"Feliz Navidad"	José Feliciano	3:10
4.	"Jingle Bell Rock"	Joe Beal, Jim Booth	2:41
5.	"Rudolph the Red-Nosed Reindeer"	Johnny Marks	2:18
6.	"God Rest Ye Merry, Gentlemen"	Traditional	2:23
7.	"Frosty the Snowman"	Steve Nelson, Walter E. Rollins	1:57
8.	"Christmas in Las Vegas"	Danny Amis, Eddie Angel, Pete Curry, Jimmy Lester	2:36
9.	"Let It Snow"	Sammy Cahn, Jule Styne	2:12
10.	"Sleigh Ride"	Leroy Anderson	2:33
11.	"Christmas Weekend"	Amis, Angel, Curry, Lester	1:53
12.	"The Little Drummer Boy"	Katherine K. Davis, Henry Onorati, Harry Simeone	2:40
13.	"The Christmas Song"	Mel Tormé, Robert Wells	3:16

== Personnel ==
Los Straitjackets

- Danny Amis – guitar
- Eddie Angel – guitar
- Pete Curry – bass, engineering, mixing
- Jimmy Lester – drums
- Scott Esbeck – bass

Additional personnel

- Mark Linnett – production, engineering
- Dennis Moody – mixing
- Jim DeMain – mastering
- Mary Gunn – artwork
