= ¡Damas y Caballeros! =

Live album by Los Straitjackets
- Released: February 27, 2001
- Recorded: September 2000 at The Foothill Tavern, Long Beach, California
- Genre: Instrumental rock, surf rock, garage rock, rock and roll
- Label: Yep Roc
- Producer: Mark Linett, Los Straitjackets

Los Straitjackets chronology
The Velvet Touch of Los Straitjackets (1999)	¡Damas y Caballeros! (2001)	Sing Along with Los Straitjackets (2001)

Professional ratings
Review scores
Source	Rating
AllMusic	4/5 stars

¡Damas y Caballeros! (Ladies and Gentlemen) is the first live album by American instrumental rock band Los Straitjackets, released on February 27, 2001, by Yep Roc Records. It was recorded in September 2000 at a performance in Long Beach, California and produced by Mark Linett and the band.

== Track listing ==
No.	Title	Music	Length
1.	"Introduction of Los Straitjackets"	Andy Paley	1:40
2.	"Outta Gear"	Eddie Angel	2:43
3.	"State Fair"	Danny Amis, Angel, Jimmy Lester	2:37
4.	"Casbah"	Angel	3:30
5.	"Calhoun Surf"	Amis	1:49
6.	"Itchy Chicken"	Angel	4:40
7.	"Last Date" (Floyd Cramer cover)	Floyd Cramer	2:49
8.	"Kawanga!"	Angel	2:24
9.	"I'm Branded" (Link Wray cover)	Link Wray	3:11
10.	"My Heart Will Go On" (Celine Dion cover)	James Horner, Will Jennings	4:25
11.	"Squad Car" (Paul Johnson cover)	Paul Johnson	1:59
12.	"Rockula"	Amis, Angel, Lester	3:07
13.	"Tempest"	Amis, Angel, Scott Esbeck, Lester	3:30
14.	"Lynxtail"	Angel	5:26
15.	"Tailspin"	Amis	4:14
16.	"Pacifica"	Amis, Angel	3:08
17.	"Driving Guitars" (The Ventures cover)	Bob Bogle, Don Wilson	1:49
18.	"Sing, Sing, Sing" (Louis Prima cover)	Louis Prima	4:24
19.	"Sleep Walk" (Santo & Johnny cover)	Santo Farina, Johnny Farina, Ann Farina	4:03
20.	"Rawhide" (Link Wray cover)	Mark Grant, Link Wray	4:01

== Personnel ==
Los Straitjackets

- Danny Amis – guitar, production, mixing, mastering
- Eddie Angel – guitar, production
- Pete Curry – bass, production
- Jimmy Lester – drums, production

Additional personnel

- Mark Linett – production, engineering, mixing, mastering
- Margaret Gwynne – engineering
- Kaiser George and the Hi-Risers – choreography
