= ¡Viva! Los Straitjackets =

Studio album by Los Straitjackets
- Released: June 1996
- Recorded: January 1996 in Los Angeles, California
- Genre: Instrumental rock, surf rock, garage rock, rock and roll
- Length: 37:55
- Label: Upstart
- Producer: Ben Vaughn

Los Straitjackets chronology
The Utterly Fantastic and Totally Unbelievable Sound of Los Straitjackets (1995)	¡Viva! Los Straitjackets (1996)	The Velvet Touch of Los Straitjackets (1999)

Professional ratings
Review scores
Source	Rating
AllMusic	4/5 stars

¡Viva! Los Straitjackets is the second studio album by American instrumental rock band Los Straitjackets, released in June 1996 by Upstart Records. It was recorded in January 1996 in Los Angeles, California, produced by Ben Vaughn and engineered by Mark Linett.

== Track listing ==
No.	Title	Music	Length
1.	"Cavalcade"	Danny Amis, Eddie Angel, Scott Esbeck, Jimmy Lester	2:33
2.	"The Casbah"	Angel	2:40
3.	"Wrong Planet"	Amis	1:45
4.	"Lonely Apache"	Angel	2:54
5.	"Outta Gear"	Angel	2:03
6.	"Pacifica"	Amis, Angel	3:01
7.	"Espionage"	Amis	2:25
8.	"Swamp Fire"	Angel	3:53
9.	"Lawnmower"	Amis, Angel, Esbeck, Ben Vaughn	2:14
10.	"Lurking in the Shadows"	Amis, Angel, Esbeck, Lester	2:31
11.	"Brains and Eggs"	Amis, Angel, Esbeck, Lester	3:07
12.	"Venturing Out"	Angel	2:47
13.	"Tsunami!"	Amis	2:32
14.	"Nightmare in Monte Cristo"	Amis	3:30

== Personnel ==
Los Straitjackets

- Danny Amis – guitar
- Eddie Angel – guitar
- Scott Esbeck – bass
- Jimmy Lester – drums, triangle

Additional personnel

- Ben Vaughn – production, guitar
- Mark Linett – engineering
- Brad Talbott – artwork
- Jim Hagans – photography
