= The California =

EP by Dressy Bessy
- Released: November 2000
- Recorded: Spring and Summer, 2000
- Genre: Pop, Indie
- Length: 14:02
- Label: Kindercore
- Producer: John Hill

Professional ratings
Review scores
| Source | Rating |
|---|---|
| AllMusic | 3/5 stars |

The California is an EP released in 2000 by Dressy Bessy on Kindercore.

The EP's sound has been described as 1960s-inspired girl group pop music. The Riverfront Times called the album "a textbook example of the Elephant 6 formula".

== Track listing ==
1. "California" – 02:45
2. "Some Better Days" – 02:16
3. "Super Everything" – 02:33
4. "Hangout Wonderful" – 03:16
5. "In the Morning" – 03:13

== Personnel ==
=== Performance ===
- John Hill – guitar, backing vocals
- Tammy Ealom – guitar, vocals, Keyboards
- Rob Greene – bass, handclaps
- Darren Albert – drums, backing vocals, percussion

=== Production ===
The EP was produced by John Hill in Denver, Colorado and was mixed and mastered by Robert Schneider at Pet Sounds Studio.
