= The Early Four Track Recordings =

Compilation album by of Montreal
- Released: January 16, 2001
- Genre: Indie pop, lo-fi pop
- Length: 41:59
- Label: Kindercore

Of Montreal chronology
Horse & Elephant Eatery (No Elephants Allowed): The Singles and Songles Album (2000)	The Early Four Track Recordings (2001)	Coquelicot Asleep in the Poppies: A Variety of Whimsical Verse (2001)

The Early Four Track Recordings is a compilation album by indie rock band of Montreal. It contains early recordings from the band, with the song titles changed to ones which tell a fictional story about actor Dustin Hoffman eating his bathtub. The album was originally released January 16, 2001, by Kindercore and later reissued by Polyvinyl Record Co. on March 7, 2006.

== Background ==
The album's songs have nothing to do with Dustin Hoffman beyond their track names. The connection to Hoffman is only for humor and to give some coherence to the songs' content. The songs are lo-fi demo recordings made mostly by Barnes alone with a 4-track recorder, drawn together from several different recording sessions.

== Style and reception ==
Professional ratings
Review scores
Source	Rating
AllMusic	2/5 stars
Pitchfork Media	7.3/10
PopMatters	4/10

Per AllMusic's Michelle Cross, the album's "stripped-down indie pop tunes vary in tempo and mood, indicative of the musical and lyrical flexibility that [Kevin] Barnes would develop with bandmates in the albums to come", with songs featuring "Beatlesque, slightly off-kilter chord progressions and lyrics established in Of Montreal's charming debut album, Cherry Peel" and "hints at the sweet, wacky instrumentation and subject matter that brought popular and critical success to the band's fourth album, The Gay Parade." The album's "insight into Barnes' early development as an innovative songwriter is generous, but on the whole, The Early Four Track Recordings does not add tremendous value" to the band's discography.

Pitchfork's Matt LeMay wrote that "Sometimes lackluster songwriting aside, The Early Four Track Recordings is a must for fans anxiously awaiting the upcoming Coquelicot Asleep in the Poppies, and a perfectly good starting point for those who might find Of Montreal's over the top pop intimidating", circumventing the "pounding ice cream headache" of their main discography and providing "almost all the goodness with none of the harmful side effects."

PopMatters's Patrick Schabe calls the album's guitars "rough, scratchy garage pop chords", says the "rhythm section consists of simplistic and rattling drum patterns" with "little hint of the melodic genius" of Barnes' later work, and calls the lyrics a "decidedly trippy word-jumble pastiche". Schabe concludes by calling the album fascinating for fans and interesting as a historical record, but generally "a sub-lo-fi recording of a guy just beginning to exercise his strengths and not having yet developed an established sense of song."

Car Seat Headrest frontman Will Toledo named The Early Four Track Recordings as one of the formative influences on his desire to self-record.

== Track listing ==
All tracks are written by Kevin Barnes

The Early Four Track Recordings track listing
No.	Title	Length
1.	"Dirty Dustin Hoffman Needs a Bath"	3:23
2.	"Dustin Hoffman Gets a Bath"	1:42
3.	"Dustin Hoffman Thinks About Eating the Soap"	3:30
4.	"Dustin Hoffman Scrubs Too Hard and Loses Soap"	2:09
5.	"Dustin Hoffman Does Not Resist Temptation to Eat the Bathtub"	3:18
6.	"Dustin Hoffman's Wife Comes Home"	2:38
7.	"Dustin Hoffman's Wife Seems Suspicious About the Absent Tub"	0:58
8.	"Dustin Hoffman Feigns Ignorance of Missing Bathtub (There Is Only One R in Ignorrance)"	2:23
9.	"Dustin Hoffman's Wife Calls in Detective to Dust for Porcelain Particles on Dustin Hoffman's Tongue"	2:19
10.	"Dustin Hoffman's Tongue Taken to Police Lab Where It Is Used as Toilet Paper and Reading Material While on the Toilet (Naughty)"	1:13
11.	"Dustin Hoffman Offers Lame Possible Explanation for Missing Bathtub (Front Cover)"	2:49
12.	"Dustin Hoffman's Wife Makes a Sarcastic Remark, Cuts the Head Off a Duck, Places It Where the Tub Was and Begins to Groan (Growl)"	1:27
13.	"Dustin Hoffman Becomes Indignant and Wets Himself"	5:09
14.	"Dustin Hoffman Quits Bathroom and Climbs a Tree"	2:24
15.	"Dustin Hoffman's Children Enter the Bathroom"	2:47
16.	"Dustin Hoffman's Children Don't Enter the Bathroom"	3:50
Total length:		41:59
