= Beautiful Thing =

Beautiful Thing(s) may refer to:

== Music ==
=== Albums ===
- Beautiful Thing (Alexis Taylor album) or the title song, 2018
- Beautiful Thing (Ben Vaughn album) or the title song, 1987
- A Beautiful Thing: Idles Live at le Bataclan, by Idles, 2019
- Beautiful Things (album), by Anthony Green, 2012
- Beautiful Things or the title song, by Gungor, 2010

=== Songs ===
- "Beautiful Thing" (Do song), 2006
- "Beautiful Thing" (The Stone Roses song), 2016
- "Beautiful Thing", by Haven, 2001
- "Beautiful Thing", by S Club 8 and the cast of I Dream from Welcome to Avalon Heights, 2004
- "Beautiful Thing", by Sister Hazel from Fortress, 2000
- "Beautiful Things" (Ai song), 2012
- "Beautiful Things" (Andain song), 2003
- "Beautiful Things" (Benson Boone song), 2024
- "Beautiful Things" (Megan Moroney song), 2025
- "Beautiful Things", by the 3Ds, 1993
- "Beautiful Things", by Roxette from Have a Nice Day, 1999
- "Beautiful Things", composed by Leslie Bricusse from the film Doctor Dolittle, 1967

== Theatre and film ==
- Beautiful Thing (play), a 1993 play by Jonathan Harvey
  - Beautiful Thing (film), a 1996 film adaptation of the play
- Beautiful Things, winner of the Next:Wave Award at the 2018 Copenhagen International Documentary Festival

== Other uses ==
- "Beautiful Thing" (audio drama), an episode of the Doctor Who audio series Jago & Litefoot
- Beautiful Things (memoir), a 2021 memoir by Hunter Biden

== See also ==
- It's a Beautiful Thing (disambiguation)
