= Deflated Chime, Foals Slightly Flower Sibylline Responses =

EP by of Montreal
- Released: January 19, 2006
- Genre: Indie pop
- Length: 17:01
- Label: Polyvinyl
- Producer: Kevin Barnes

Of Montreal chronology
The Sunlandic Twins (2005)	Deflated Chime, Foals Slightly Flower Sibylline Responses (2006)	Satanic Twins (2006)

Deflated Chime, Foals Slightly Flower Sibylline Responses is a limited edition tour-only EP by Elephant Six indie rock band of Montreal. The EP contains two previously released songs, "Disconnect the Dots" from Satanic Panic in the Attic and "Wraith Pinned to the Mist (And Other Games)" from The Sunlandic Twins, and two new songs, "Psychotic Feeling" and "Noir Blues to Tinnitus."

After the EP's release, "Noir Blues to Tinnitus" was included as the b-side to "Voltaic Crusher/Undrum to Muted Da" from Suicide Squeeze and also appears on the 2012 of Montreal compilation album Daughter of Cloud. The single was sold by the band on their tour in support of The Sunlandic Twins. It was given a rating of five by PopMatters.

== Track listing ==
1. "Wraith Pinned to the Mist (and Other Games)" - 4:07
2. "Disconnect the Dots" - 4:25
3. "Psychotic Feeling" - 3:03
4. "Noir Blues to Tinnitus" - 5:26
