= Rock en Español (disambiguation) =

Rock en Español may refer to:

- Rock en español, Spanish-language rock music
- Rock en Español: Lo Mejor de Cuca, a 2001 album by Cuca
- Rock en Español, Vol. 1, a 2007 album by Los Straitjackets
