= Horse & Elephant Eatery (No Elephants Allowed): The Singles and Songles Album =

Compilation album by of Montreal
- Released: 28 March 2000
- Genre: Psychedelic pop
- Length: 37:21
- Label: Bar/None

Of Montreal chronology
| The Gay Parade (1999) | Horse & Elephant Eatery (No Elephants Allowed): The Singles and Songles Album (2000) | The Early Four Track Recordings (2001) |

Professional ratings
Review scores
| Source | Rating |
|---|---|
| AllMusic | 4/5 stars |
| Pitchfork | 8.3/10 |

Horse & Elephant Eatery (No Elephants Allowed): The Singles and Songles Album is a compilation album released by the band of Montreal. It was released by Bar/None Records in 2000 and contains bonus tracks and rare tracks from singles over their career.

== Track listing ==
1. "A Celebration of H. Hare" (Bee's Knees 7")
2. "Joseph and Alexander" (Japanese Cherry Peel)
3. "The Problem with April" (Japanese The Gay Parade)
4. "Nicki Lighthouse" (100 Guitar Mania 7")
5. "Was Your Face a Head in the Pillowcase?" (previously unreleased)
6. "Julie the Mouse" (Japanese A Petite Tragedy)
7. "In the Army Kid" (Japanese A Petite Tragedy)
8. "Buried with Me" (previously unreleased)
9. "Spoonful of Sugar" (100 Guitar Mania The Gants tribute 7")
10. "Ira's Brief Life as a Spider" (previously unreleased)
11. "The World Keeps Going Round" (previously unreleased The Kinks Cover)
12. "Scenes from My Funeral" (100 Guitar Mania 7")
13. "True Friends Don't Want to Do Things Like That" (The Gay Parade vinyl 7)
14. "The You I Created" (Kindercore singles club under the pseudonym "My First Keyboard")
