= Kingsized =

Studio album by Dressy Bessy
- Released: February 5, 2016
- Genre: Pop rock, indie rock
- Length: 44:27
- Label: Yep Roc
- Producer: Tammy Ealom and John Hill

Dressy Bessy chronology
Holler and Stomp (2008)	Kingsized (2016)

Kingsized (stylized in all caps) is the sixth studio album from Denver quartet Dressy Bessy. The album was released on Yep Roc Records in February 2016.

Peter Buck and Scott McCaughey guest on the album.

Professional ratings
Review scores
Source	Rating
AllMusic	3.5/5 stars

== Track listing ==
All tracks composed by Tammy Ealom

1. "Lady Liberty"
2. "Get Along (Diamond Ring)"
3. "Electrified"
4. "These Modern Guns"
5. "Pop Phenom"
6. "Kingsized"
7. "Cup 'o Bang Bang"
8. "Giddyup"
9. "Honey Bee"
10. "Make Mine Violet"
11. "57 Disco"
12. "Dirty Birdies"
13. "Say Goodbye"
14. "In Particular"
