= Down the Elements =

Studio album by Japancakes
- Released: April 20, 2000
- Genre: Indie rock
- Length: 35:20
- Label: Kindercore
- Producer: Andy Baker

Japancakes chronology
If I Could See Dallas (1999)	Down the Elements (2000)	The Sleepy Strange (2001)

Professional ratings
Review scores
Source	Rating
AllMusic	4/5 stars
Pitchfork	4.0/10

Down the Elements is an EP by indie rock band Japancakes. It was released in 2000 on Kindercore.

== Production ==
The EP was produced by Andy Baker. Its songs were taken from the same recording sessions that produced the band's debut release.

== Critical reception ==
In his review for Westword, Michael Roberts wrote: "[Frontman Eric] Berg creates instrumental music that's alternately stirring and meditative, straightforward and intricate, undemanding and daring. But whereas Tortoise, an obvious influence, can sometimes seem a bit clinical, Japancakes retains a garagey, hey-kids-let's-put-on-a-show feel. It's esoterica of a notably warm and inviting sort." CMJ New Music Report deemed "A. W. Sonic" "an impossibly buoyant 11-minute jam."

== Track listing ==
1. "Version 1"
2. "A. W. Sonic"
3. "Sputnik"
4. "Down the Elements"
