= Love Is a Beautiful Thing =

Love Is a Beautiful Thing may refer to:

- "Love Is a Beautiful Thing" (Phil Vassar song), originally released by Paul Brandt under the title "It's a Beautiful Thing"
- "Love Is a Beautiful Thing" (Al Green song)
- "Love Is a Beautiful Thing", a song by Christian hip hop band Group 1 Crew
- "Love Is a Beautiful Thing", a song by the Rascals, from the B-side of "You Better Run"

== See also ==
- It's a Beautiful Thing (disambiguation)
