= SoundGoRound =

Sound Go Round

Studio album by Dressy Bessy
- Released: August 26, 2002
- Recorded: 2000 – 2001
- Genres: Pop, Indie
- Label: Kindercore Records

Dressy Bessy chronology
Pink Hearts Yellow Moons (1999)	Sound Go Round (2002)	Dressy Bessy (2003)

Professional ratings
Review scores
Source	Rating
AllMusic	3/5 stars

Sound Go Round is an album by Dressy Bessy. It was released in 2002 by Kindercore Records.

The Washington Post compared the sound of the album to the "acid-flavored 'gum" of sixties acts Strawberry Alarm Clock and Lemon Pipers.

== Track listing ==
1. "I Saw Cinnamon" – 2:10
2. "Tag" – 0:42
3. "There's a Girl" – 3:00
4. "Just Being Me" – 2:49
5. "That's Why" – 2:23
6. "Oh Mi Amour" – 2:33
7. "Buttercups" – 2:55
8. "Maybe Laughter" – 2:19
9. "Big to Do" – 3:04
10. "All These Colors" – 1:41
11. "Flower Jargon" – 4:22
12. "Fare Thee Well" – 2:20
13. "Carry-On" – 5:01
