= Dressy Bessy =

Indie rock band

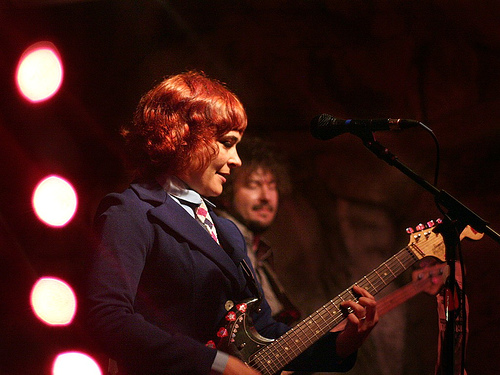

Background information
- Origin: Denver, Colorado, United States
- Genres: Indie rock, power pop
- Years active: 1996–present
- Labels: Kindercore Records; Transdreamer Records; Yep Roc Records; Burger Records
- Members: Tammy Ealom; John Hill; Craig Gilbert
- Past members: Darren Albert; Rob Greene; Jeff Fuller; Becky Barron; James Barone; Paul Garcia
- Website: dressybessy.com

Dressy Bessy is an American indie rock band from Denver, Colorado, led by songwriter, guitarist, and vocalist, Tammy Ealom. The band is associated with the Elephant Six Recording Company and shares guitarist John Hill with The Apples in Stereo. Ealom formed the band with drummer Darren Albert and bassist Rob Greene in 1996. Hill joined the band after helping engineer early recordings in 1997. The name was taken from a popular Playskool doll of the 1970s.

== 1996–present ==
They released two singles and an EP in 1997–98 and licensed songs to some compilation albums.

Dressy Bessy's first album Pink Hearts, Yellow Moons (1999) was a mixture of beat group drums, infectious songs, and the odd burst of harmonium. Further releases include The California EP (2000), Sound Go Round (2002), and 2003's Dressy Bessy, which incorporated a harder guitar sound. 2003 also brought the compilation Little Music: Singles 1997-2002. These albums were initially released on Kindercore Records of Athens, Georgia. Their songs "If You Should Try to Kiss Her" and "Just Like Henry" were featured in the 1999 indie film But I'm a Cheerleader.

In late 2003, drummer Darren Albert left the band and was replaced in 2005 by Craig Gilbert. Later that year, the band signed to Transdreamer Records and recorded their fourth album, Electrified, which was released in June 2005. The band released Holler and Stomp, on September 16, 2008.

Dressy Bessy released KINGSIZED on Yep Roc Records (CD, LP) and Burger Records (CS), on February 5, 2016.

The band's seventh studio album, titled Fast Faster Disaster, was released on June 14, 2019 by Yep Roc Records and Burger Records.

== Members ==
- Tammy Ealom – Guitar, Lead vocals (1996–present)
- Rob Greene – Bass (1996–2014)
- Darren Albert – Drums (1996–2003)
- John Hill – Guitar (1997–present)
- Becky Barron – Drums (2004) (Touring member)
- Craig Gilbert – Drums (2005–present)
- James Barone – Drums (2008) (Touring member)
- Paul Garcia – Guitar, Keyboards, Percussion (2008) (Touring member)
- Jeff Fuller – Bass (2016–2017) (Touring member)
- Michael Giblin – Bass (2016–2018) (Touring member, recording contributor)
- Eric Allen – Bass (2018) (Touring member, recording contributor)
- Lindsay Romig – Keyboards (Touring member, recording contributor)

== Discography ==
=== Albums ===
- Pink Hearts Yellow Moons (Kindercore; CD/LP; 1999)
- SoundGoRound (Kindercore; CD/LP; 2002)
- Little Music: Singles 1997-2002 (Kindercore; CD/LP; 2003)
- Dressy Bessy (Kindercore; CD; 2003)
- Electrified (Transdreamer Records; CD/LP; 2005)
- Holler and Stomp (Transdreamer Records; CD/LP; 2008)
- KINGSIZED (Yep Roc Records / Burger Records; CD/LP/CS; 2016)
- Fast Faster Disaster (Yep Roc Records / Burger Records; CD/LP; 2019)

=== EPs and singles ===
- Ultra Vivid Color (Little Dipper; 7"; 1997)
- You Stand Here (Drug Racer; CD; 1998)
- Sunny (100 Guitar Mania; 7"; 1999)
- The California EP (Kindercore; CD; 2000)
- Split w/ Saloon (Track & Field Organisation; 7"; 2002)
- Lady Liberty b/w What Is Life (Yep Roc Records; 7"; 2015)
- Summer Singles Volume 1 & 2 (High Dive Records: 7"; 2017)

=== Compilations ===
- "The Things That You Say That You Do" on Dive Right Inn: The Only Spring Break CD You'll Need (American Eagle Outfitters; CD; 2004)
- "Makeup" on Pure Spun Sugar (CandyFloss; LP; 1998)
- "Extra-Ordinary" on A Bunch Of Beatniks Riding A Rocket (Red Carpet Ring; Cassette; 1999)
- "Lookaround" on Beikoku-Ongaku vol. 13 (Beikoku-Ongaku; CD/Mag; 1999)
- "Just Like Henry" on Counterattack Of U.S. Indie (Contact; CD; 1999)
- "All The Right Reasons" on Christmas Two (Kindercore; CD; 1999)
- "Bubbles" on The Powerpuff Girls: Heroes And Villains (Rhino; CD; 2000)
- "Gloria Days" on Songs For A Crimson Eggtree (Earworm; LP; 2000)
- "Instead" on Kindercore Fifty (Kindercore; 3 CDs; 2000)
- "Some Better Days" on The Winter Report (Hype City; CD; 2001)
- "Extra-Ordinary (re-mix)" on Space Program (Philter; CD; 2001)
- "Side 2" on Quiero ser linda como Ale !!! (Niñoboy; CD; 2008)

== In Other Media ==
"If You Should Try To Kiss Her" and "Just Like Henry" from the album Pink Hearts Yellow Moons feature in the 1999 motion picture But I'm a Cheerleader. "Just Like Henry" also featured in the 2012 film Picture Day. "Lookaround," also from the album Pink Hearts Yellow Moons, appeared in the 15th episode of season 3 of Felicity, "Senioritis".

The band performed "Just Once More" from the album Dressy Bessy on the October 31, 2003 episode of Last Call with Carson Daly. They performed "Electrified" from the album Electrified on the August 5, 2005 episode of Late Night with Conan O'Brien. "Side 2," also from Electrified, featured in the 2006 motion picture She's the Man.
