= Beautiful Thing (Ben Vaughn album) =

Studio album by Ben Vaughn
- Released: 1987
- Genre: Rock
- Label: Restless
- Producer: Ben Vaughn

Ben Vaughn chronology
The Many Moods of Ben Vaughn (1986)	Beautiful Thing (1987)	Blows Your Mind (1988)

Beautiful Thing is an album by the American rock and roll musician Ben Vaughn (credited to the Ben Vaughn Combo), released in 1987. The album's final track, "The Apology Line", is covered on Barrence Whitfield's Ow! Ow! Ow!

== Production ==
The album was produced by Vaughn, who also wrote the songs. Mostly acoustic, the songs were in part inspired by radio disc jockey patter and random conversations overheard by Vaughn. The band used bongos, hubcaps, maracas, and accordion on many of the tracks. "Big House with a Yard" is about a man asking his girlfriend to visit him in prison.

== Critical reception ==
Professional ratings
Review scores
Source	Rating
AllMusic	3.5/5 stars
Chicago Tribune	2.5/4 stars
Robert Christgau	B
The Encyclopedia of Popular Music	3/5 stars
Goldmine	3/5 stars
New Musical Express	9/10
The Philadelphia Inquirer	4/4 stars
Richmond Times-Dispatch	B

Robert Christgau thought that, "unlike many comedians, this mild-mannered male chauvinist is funniest when he lets on how clever he is." Trouser Press wrote that "Beautiful Thing has a fresh, easygoing feel, but too much restraint can be dangerous: halfway through the first side, this mild record threatens to slide right off the turntable." The New York Times concluded that "all the three-chord rock of the 1950's and 60's—rockabilly, surf-rock, Cajun, rhythm-and-blues, country—twangs and relaxes together in the Ben Vaughn Combo, as Mr. Vaughn talk-sings his way through droll, understated songs without a hint of rock's latter-day histrionics." The Philadelphia Inquirer deemed the album "a marvelously eclectic collection of rock styles and romantic observations."

The Philadelphia Daily News called the tracks "clever, evocative new songs in a time honored, timeless style," writing that the band "has a slap happy simplicity and ragged enthusiasm that's anachronistic, that seems a throwback to the 1950s rockabilly era of Eddie Cochran and Buddy Holly and the Big Bopper." The Washington Post determined that "sometimes Vaughn sounds like what might have happened if Lou Reed had influenced Bob Dylan rather than the other way around, but he always manages a neat wedding of lyric and melody." The Chicago Tribune stated that "Vaughn brings some uncommon touches to numbers about male-female relationships." The State included Beautiful Thing on its list of the ten best albums of 1987.

AllMusic wrote that "the tunes on Beautiful Thing never hit harder than they have to or take up more space than necessary, and their modesty only adds to their effectiveness."

== Track listing ==
No.	Title	Length
1.	"Jerry Lewis in France"
2.	"Clothes Don't Make the Man"
3.	"Beautiful Thing"
4.	"The North Wind Blew"
5.	"Shingaling with Me"
6.	"Gimme, Gimme, Gimme"
7.	"She's a Real Scream"
8.	"Big House with a Yard"
9.	"On the Rebound"
10.	"A Good Woman Is Hard to Find"
11.	"Desert Boots"
12.	"The Apology Line"
