= Dressy Bessy (album) =

Studio album by Dressy Bessy
- Released: August 26, 2003
- Genre: Pop, Indie
- Length: 39:26
- Label: Kindercore Records
- Producer: Britt Myers

Dressy Bessy chronology
SoundGoRound (2002)	Dressy Bessy (2003)	Electrified (2005)

Professional ratings
Review scores
Source	Rating
AllMusic	4/5 stars

Dressy Bessy is the third studio album by Dressy Bessy. It was released on August 26, 2003 (see 2003 in music). The CD came with a bonus DVD that included music videos and live footage of the band.

== Track listing ==
All songs written by Tammy Ealom

1. "Just Once More"
2. "The Things That You Say That You Do"
3. "Baby Six String"
4. "This May Hurt (A Little)"
5. "Georgie Blue"
6. "Girl, You Shout!"
7. "Hey May"
8. "New Song (From Me to You)"
9. "Better Luck"
10. "Blink Twice"
11. "Tidy"
