= If I Could See Dallas =

Studio album by Japancakes
- Released: October 13, 1999
- Genre: Indie rock Post rock
- Length: 54:23
- Label: Kindercore Records
- Producer: Japancakes

Japancakes chronology
If I Could See Dallas (1999)	Down the Elements (2000)

Professional ratings
Review scores
Source	Rating
AllMusic	4.5/5 stars
Pitchfork	6.5/10

If I Could See Dallas is the first album by the indie rock band Japancakes, released in 1999.

== Critical reception ==
AllMusic wrote that "for all of the record's cosmic glow, the recurring presence of steel guitar keeps the music rooted in terra firma, a paradox which makes the music that much more difficult to pinpoint in any single time or place." Exclaim! thought that "people inclined to easy classifications will call this post-rock, but unlike the cold air of academia that enshrouds the likes of Tortoise, Japancakes’ music possesses the heart and warmth of the Georgia environs that birthed it." Rolling Stone wrote that the album is "flecked with melodic nuance, subtle turns of phrase that enrich the music's lazy-river flow."

== Track listing ==
1. "Now Wait for Last Year"
2. "Elevator Headphone"
3. "Vocode-Inn"
4. "Toomsuba"
5. "A Short Mile"
6. "Pole Tricks"
7. "Elephants"
8. "Westworld"
9. "Baker Beats"
10. "Dallas"
11. "Allah Rahka"
