= The Utterly Fantastic and Totally Unbelievable Sound of Los Straitjackets =

Studio album by Los Straitjackets
- Released: March 1995
- Recorded: July 1994 at Alex the Great Studio, Nashville, Tennessee
- Genre: Instrumental rock, surf rock, garage rock, rock and roll
- Length: 39:19
- Label: Upstart
- Producer: Ben Vaughn

Los Straitjackets chronology
The Utterly Fantastic and Totally Unbelievable Sound of Los Straitjackets (1995)	¡Viva! Los Straitjackets (1996)

Professional ratings
Review scores
Source	Rating
AllMusic	3/5 stars

The Utterly Fantastic and Totally Unbelievable Sound of Los Straitjackets is the debut studio album by American instrumental rock band Los Straitjackets, released in March 1995 by Upstart Records. It was recorded in July 1994 at Alex the Great Studio, produced by Ben Vaughn and engineered by Brad Jones.

== Track listing ==
No.	Title	Music	Length
1.	"Fury!"	Eddie Angel	2:09
2.	"G-Man"	Danny Amis	3:16
3.	"Straightjacket"	Angel	3:48
4.	"Jetty Motel"	Amis, Ben Vaughn	2:30
5.	"Car-Hop" (The Exports cover)	George Felaney	2:12
6.	"Caveman"	Angel	2:45
7.	"Tailspin"	Amis	4:05
8.	"University Blvd."	Angel	2:49
9.	"Gatecrusher"	Amis	2:01
10.	"Itchy Chicken"	Angel	2:40
11.	"Della Street" (Raybeats cover)	Amis, Don Christensen, Jody Harris, Pat Irwin	3:57
12.	"Calhoun Surf"	Amis	1:51
13.	"Rampage"	Angel	2:26
14.	"Lynxtail"	Angel	2:50

== Personnel ==
Los Straitjackets

- Danny Amis – guitar
- Eddie Angel – guitar
- Scott Esbeck – bass
- Jimmy Lester – drums

Additional personnel

- Ben Vaughn – production
- Brad Jones – engineering
