= Supersonic Guitars in 3-D =

Studio album by Los Straitjackets
- Released: September 9, 2003
- Genre: Instrumental rock, surf rock, garage rock, rock and roll
- Label: Yep Roc
- Producer: Mark Neill

Los Straitjackets chronology
'Tis the Season for Los Straitjackets! (2002)	Supersonic Guitars in 3-D (2003)	Play Favourites (2004)

Professional ratings
Review scores
Source	Rating
AllMusic	3/5 stars

Supersonic Guitars in 3-D is the seventh studio album by American instrumental rock band Los Straitjackets, released on September 9, 2003, by Yep Roc Records.

== Track listing ==
No.	Title	Writer(s)	Length
1.	"Squid"	Danny Amis, Eddie Angel, Pete Curry, Jimmy Lester, Mark Neill	1:48
2.	"Dipinto Twist"	Curry	1:53
3.	"Time Bomb"	Amis, Angel, Curry, Lester, Neill	2:35
4.	"Can You Dig It?"	Amis, Angel, Curry, Lester	3:38
5.	"San Diego Shutdown"	Amis, Angel, Curry, Lester	2:22
6.	"Isn't Love Grand?"	Angel	2:16
7.	"Giggle Water"	Amis, Angel, Curry, Lester	2:18
8.	"Midnight in Salerno"	Amis	2:56
9.	"Beach Bag"	Amis, Angel, Curry, Lester	2:47
10.	"Jungleaya"	Amis, Angel, Curry, Lester	2:10
11.	"Galaxy Drive"	Amis, Angel, Curry, Lester	2:11
12.	"Tarantula"	Amis, Angel, Curry, Lester	2:39
13.	"Dreamland"	Amis, Angel, Curry, Lester	3:11

== Personnel ==
Los Straitjackets

- Danny Amis – guitar
- Eddie Angel – guitar, bass
- Pete Curry – bass, guitar
- Jimmy Lester – drums

Guest musicians

- Anja Dixon – vocals
- Stax – vocals
- Billy Zoom – flute, saxophone
- Mitch Manker & his Brass Section – trumpets
- D. J. Bonebrake – vibraphone

Additional personnel

- Mark Neill – production
- Peter DuCharme – engineering
- Jim DeMain – mastering
- Doctor Alderete – artwork
- Mary Gunn – graphic design
