= Rock en Español, Vol. 1 =

Studio album by Los Straitjackets
- Released: April 3, 2007
- Label: Yep Roc
- Producer: Cesar Rosas

Los Straitjackets chronology
Encyclopedia of Sound, Vol. 2 (2005)	Rock en Español, Vol. 1 (2007)	The Further Adventures of Los Straitjackets (2009)

Professional ratings
Review scores
Source	Rating
Allmusic	link
Robert Christgau	(2-star Honorable Mention)

Rock en Español, Vol. 1 is an album by instrumental rock band Los Straitjackets consisting of Spanish language covers of classic 1950s and 1960s English language rock songs. The band at the time of recording was Danny Amis on guitar, Eddie Angel on guitar and bass, Pete Curry on bass and guitar, and Jason Smay on drums and percussion. The band recruited guest vocalists Big Sandy of Big Sandy & His Fly-Rite Boys, Cesar Rosas of Los Lobos, and Little Willie G. of Thee Midniters.

== Track listing ==
1. "De Dia y de Noche" (2:20) - "All Day and All of the Night" (1964) by The Kinks

- Lead vocals: Big Sandy
- Rhythm guitar: Pete Curry
- Lead guitar: Eddie Angel
- Bass: Danny Amis
- Background vocals: Los Cantantes Enmascarados

2. "Dejenme Llorar" (2:41) - by Los Freddy's (1973)

- Lead vocals, cowbell: Cesar Rosas

3. "Whittier Boulevard" (2:44) - by Thee Midniters (1965)

- Organ: Reverend Charles Williams

4. "Ana" (3:02) - "Anna (Go to Him)" (1962) by Arthur Alexander

- Lead vocals: Little Willie G.
- Piano: Reverend Charles Williams
- Rhythm guitar: Pete Curry
- Acoustic guitar, vihuela: Cesar Rosas
- Background vocals: Lonely Blue Boys

5. "El Microscopico Bikini" (2:51) - "Dizzy Miss Lizzy" (1958) by Larry Williams

- Lead vocals: Cesar Rosas

6. "Dame Una Seña" (2:38) - "Gimme Little Sign" (1967) by Brenton Wood

- Lead vocals: Big Sandy
- Background vocals, guitar, B3 organ: Cesar Rosas
- Additional organ: Pete Curry

7. "La Hiedra Venenosa" (3:12) - "Poison Ivy" (1959) by The Coasters

- Lead vocals: Big Sandy
- Background vocals: Cesar Rosas, Los Cantantes Enmascarados, Lonely Blue Boys

8. "Calor" (2:53) - "Slow Down" (1958) by Larry Williams

- Lead vocals: Big Sandy
- Piano: Pete Curry

9. "Hey Lupe" (3:19) - "Hang On Sloopy" (1965) by The McCoys

- Lead vocals, background vocals: Little Willy G.
- Background vocals: Cesar Rosas, Los Cantantes Enmascarados, Lonely Blue Boys

10. "Lagrimas Solitarias" (2:49) - "Lonely Teardrops" (1958) by Jackie Wilson

- Lead vocals: Big Sandy
- Background vocals: Lonely Blue Boys

11. "Popotitos" (3:07) - "Bony Moronie" (1957) by Larry Williams

- Lead vocals: Cesar Rosas

12. "Magia Blanca" (3:37) - "Devil Woman" (1962) by Marty Robbins

- Lead vocals: Big Sandy
- Background vocals, acoustic guitar, ukulele: Cesar Rosas

13. "Loco Te Patina El Coco" (2:43) - "Wild Thing" (1966) by The Troggs

- Lead vocals: Little Willie G.

14. "Tu Te Vas" (3:03) - "You'll Lose a Good Thing" by Barbara Lynn (1962) and Freddy Fender (1976)

- Lead vocals: Big Sandy
- B3 organ, electric guitar, background vocals: Cesar Rosas
