= A Pollinaire Rave =

Live album by Kevin Barnes
- Released: 2003
- Genre: Comedy

A Pollinaire Rave was a comedy tour by of Montreal lead singer Kevin Barnes, his then-wife Nina Barnes, and his brother David Barnes. The surrealistic performances featured a variety of spoken-word, sketch comedy and music. A CD by the same name was sold, and five of the seven songs on the EP became songs on the Montreal album Satanic Panic in the Attic. The CD was self-released; both the titles and the artwork vary depending on the individual copy.

== Partial track listing ==
The track listing below reflects the titles given by Kevin Barnes at the time, followed by the names the songs eventually took on.

=== Original titles ===
1. The Fading and Frozen Phallus in the Eye of a Young Brute
2. Whatever Happened to the Breath of Tom the Sandwidth
3. Nightmare Onanism
4. Gladiator Chestsex and the Collision
5. Shut the Orb Lady
6. Wednesday's Foam on Tuesday Again?
7. Yes, The Bird May Remember Being Hoofed

=== Finished titles ===
1. How Lester Lost His Wife (demo)
2. Chrissy Kiss the Corpse (demo)
3. City Bird (demo)
4. Erroneous Escape Into Eric Eckles (demo)
5. Everything About Her is Wrong
6. Epistle to a Pathological Creep
7. Eros' Entropic Tundra (demo)
