= Disconnect the Dots =

Disconnect the Dots may refer to:

- "Disconnect the Dots", a 1997 song by Smash Mouth from the album Fush Yu Mang
- "Disconnect the Dots", a 2004 song by Of Montreal from the album Satanic Panic in the Attic
