= Encyclopedia of Sound =

Studio album by Los Straitjackets
- Released: 2001
- Genre: Instrumental rock, surf rock, garage rock, rock and roll
- Label: LoveCat
- Producer: Mark Neill

Los Straitjackets chronology
| Sing Along with Los Straitjackets (2001) | Encyclopedia of Sound (2001) | 'Tis the Season for Los Straitjackets! (2002) |

Professional ratings
Review scores
| Source | Rating |
|---|---|
| AllMusic | 3/5 stars |

Encyclopedia of Sound is the fifth studio album by American instrumental rock band Los Straitjackets, released in 2001 by LoveCat Music.

== Track listing ==
All music was composed by Danny Amis, Eddie Angel, Pete Curry and Jimmy Lester.

1. "Furious" – 1:35
2. "Road Rage" – 1:55
3. "Candy Rock" – 1:38
4. "Kaboom!" – 2:00
5. "California Fun" – 1:19
6. "Switchblade Stroll" – 1:21
7. "Cactus Walk" – 2:05
8. "Arizona Sunset" – 2:12
9. "Country Squier" (electric) – 1:23
10. "Country Squier" (acoustic) – 1:11
11. "Golden Nugget" – 1:20
12. "Heavy Bag" – 1:06
13. "Cropdustin'" – 1:32
14. "Cantina" (electric) – 1:58
15. "Cantina" (acoustic) – 2:00
16. "Sombrero" – 1:29
17. "Onion Dip" – 3:02
18. "Pot Liquor" – 1:46
19. "Man from S.W.A.M.P" – 2:52
20. "Dipsy Doodle" – 1:53
21. "Take the 405" – 1:33
22. "Fuzzy Nova" – 2:17

== Personnel ==
Los Straitjackets

- Danny Amis – guitar
- Eddie Angel – guitar
- Pete Curry – bass
- Jimmy Lester – drums

Additional personnel

- Mark Neill – production
- Carol Sue Baker – arrangements
