= Ow! Ow! Ow! =

Studio album by Barrence Whitfield
- Released: 1987
- Length: R&B, garage rock
- Label: Rounder

Barrence Whitfield chronology
Call of the Wild EP (1987)	Ow! Ow! Ow! (1987)	Live Emulsified (1989)

Ow! Ow! Ow! is an album by the American musician Barrence Whitfield. The album is also credited to Whitfield's backing band, the Savages, which on Ow! Ow! Ow! constituted an entirely new lineup. Released in 1987, Ow! Ow! Ow! is a packaging of the Call of the Wild EP with five additional songs. It sold around 19,000 copies in its first six months of release. Whitfield supported the album by touring Solomon Burke and Tina Turner, among other.

== Production ==
"Apology Line" is a cover of the Ben Vaughn song. Guitarist Milton Reder and saxophonist David Sholl wrote five of the album's songs.

== Critical reception ==
Professional ratings
Review scores
Source	Rating
AllMusic	4.5/5 stars
Chicago Tribune	1.5/4 stars
Robert Christgau	B+
The Encyclopedia of Popular Music	3/5 stars
Houston Chronicle	4/4 stars

Robert Christgau thought that the "best originals are indistinguishable from the obscure old backbeat grooves and frantic novelties that are his trademark." Trouser Press determined that "it's likable enough—this man can sing—but seriously short in the funkalicious spirit that makes the earlier [releases] so precious." The Boston Globe concluded that the album "is a magnificent show of first-class songwriting by the Savages (especially guitarist Milton Reder) and allows Whitfield the freedom to smash stereotypes about his limited range." The Houston Chronicle stated that "Whitfield growls and prowls, whoops and hollers, while his ready-steady Savages get to setting a wild yet solid foundation etched in guitar and sax."

The Washington Post wrote that "the album boasts some great party tunes, beginning with 'Rockin' the Mule, a blustery old-fashioned Little Richard-whooping shout mercilessly driven by the band." Spin deemed the album "loaded with ultra-tuff swing and sway," writing that Whitfield's "lean and mean butt kick has developed more nuance while losing none of its maximum torque groove power." The Chicago Tribune opined that "the playing on Ow! Ow! Ow! is workmanlike at best, and despite heaps of whoops and shouts tossed in by Whitfield—give him credit for trying to create some excitement—this LP never packs the rough-and-raucous punch of the earlier album."

AllMusic wrote that "what makes this the strongest Whitfield/Savages album is its variety, and the fact that Barry's voice is strong and versatile enough to bring more nuance and emotion to the material." The New Yorker called the album "incendiary," writing that it captured the band's "garrulous brand of garage-rockin' R. & B."

== Track listing ==
No.	Title	Writer(s)	Length
1.	"Rockin' the Mule"	Sid Prosin
2.	"Madhouse"	Milton Reder
3.	"Apology Line"	Ben Vaughn
4.	"I Don't Dig Your Noise"	David Sholl, Lorne Entress
5.	"Living Proof"	Jon Tiven, Reder, Sally Tiven
6.	"Stop Twistin' My Arm"	Sholl
7.	"Girl from Outer Space"	Milton Reder
8.	"Runnin' and Hidin'"	Jon Tiven, Reder, Sally Tiven
9.	"The Blues Is a Thief"	Sholl
10.	"Ain't She Wild"	Reder
11.	"Chillin'"
