= If He Is Protecting Our Nation, Then Who Will Protect Big Oil, Our Children? =

Compilation album by of Montreal
- Released: July 1, 2003
- Recorded: 2002
- Genre: Indie pop
- Length: 30:29
- Label: Track and Field
- Producer: Kevin Barnes

Of Montreal chronology
Aldhils Arboretum (2002)	If He Is Protecting Our Nation, Then Who Will Protect Big Oil, Our Children? (2003)	Satanic Panic in the Attic (2004)

Professional ratings
Review scores
Source	Rating
Allmusic	3/5 stars
Pitchfork Media	(5.3/10)

If He Is Protecting Our Nation, Then Who Will Protect Big Oil, Our Children? is an album by indie rock band of Montreal. Originally self-released by the band as a tour-only CD, it was later released commercially with a few changes.

== Track listing of commercial release ==
1. "My, What a Strange Day with a Swede" - 4:11
2. "An Ill-Treated Hiccup" - 2:23
3. "Cast in the Haze (Been There Four Days)" - 2:46
4. "Mimi Merlot Beatnik Version" - 0:31
5. "Girl From NYC (Named Julia)" - 2:15
6. "Inside a Room Full of Treasures, a Black Pygmy Horse's Head Pops Up Like a Periscope" - 2:28
7. "Charlie and Freddy" - 1:31
8. "There Is Nothing Wrong with Hating Rock Critics" - 4:41
9. "Maple Licorice" - 0:58
10. "Barely Asian at the Beefcake Horizon" - 1:13
11. "Spooky Spider Chandelier" - 1:30
12. "Friends of Mine" (The Zombies cover) - 2:20
13. "Christmas Isn't Safe for Animals" - 3:42

== Track listing of original tour-only CD ==
1. "My, What a Strange Day with a Swede" - 4:11
2. "An Ill-Treated Hiccup" - 2:25
3. "Cast in the Haze (Been There Four Days)" - 3:01
4. "She's My Best Friend" (Velvet Underground cover) - 3:30
5. "Mimi Merlot Beatnik Version" - 0:29
6. "Neru No Daisuki" - 3:25
7. "Maple Licorice" - 1:01
8. "Inside a Room Full of Treasures, a Black Pygmy Horse's Head Pops Up Like a Periscope" - 2:27
9. "Spooky Spider Chandelier" - 1:30
10. "Charlie and Freddy" - 1:32
11. "Girl From NYC #64" - 2:15
12. "Nickee Coco Chorus" - 1:21
13. "Friends of Mine" (The Zombies cover) - 2:28
14. "Christmas Isn't Safe for Animals" - 3:42
