= The Bigger Lovers =

American power pop band

The Bigger Lovers were an American power pop band from Philadelphia, Pennsylvania, United States. The band featured Bret Tobias (singer/guitarist), Ed Hogarty (guitarist), Scott Jefferson (bassist), and Patrick Berkery (drummer).

They played their farewell show on November 5, 2005.

== Discography ==
- How I Learned to Stop Worrying (2001)
- Honey in the Hive (2002, Yep Roc)
- This Affair Never Happened (2004, Yep Roc)
