= The Moaners =

American indie rock band

- Origin: Chapel Hill, North Carolina, United States
- Genres: Indie rock
- Years active: 2004 - 2011
- Labels: Holidays for Quince Records, Yep Roc Records
- Members: Melissa Swingle; Laura King

The Moaners are a Chapel Hill, North Carolina–based indie rock band. They were previously signed to Yep Roc Records. In 2004, Melissa Swingle's band Trailer Bride broke up, and she formed The Moaners with drummer Laura King, formerly of the Chapel Hill band Grand National.

The band is often compared to The White Stripes, as they are also a two-piece and employ a similar garage rock, bluesy style. The dark, southern gothic elements of Trailer Bride are also evident; however a major difference is that The Moaners have more an electric, punk rock style.

The band's first album, Dark Snack was produced by Rick Miller of the band Southern Culture on the Skids. Their next release, Blackwing Yalobusha was produced by former Squirrel Nut Zippers member Jimbo Mathus.

They appear in video documentary of the WV White Family titled "Jesco White Hellbilly Part 2".

== Discography ==
Year	Title	Label
2005	Dark Snack	Yep Roc
2007	Blackwing Yalobusha	Yep Roc
2010	Nocturnal	Holidays for Quince
