= The Relatives (band) =

American Gospel, funk and soul band

- Origin: Dallas, Texas, United States
- Genres: Gospel, soul, funk
- Years active: 1970–1980, 2009–present
- Label: Heavy Light Records/Yep Roc Records/Luv N' Haight
- Members: Rev. Tommie West (deceased); Earnest Tarkington; Tyron Edwards; Zach Ernst; Matthew Strmiska; Scott Nelson
- Past members: Rev. Gean West (deceased); Charles Ray "Gypsy" Mitchell; H.G. Turner; Willie Small; Ronnie Mitchell; Tony Corbitt (deceased); Cedric West

The Relatives are a Gospel, funk and soul band. They were formed in 1970 by brothers Reverend Gean West and Reverend Tommie West. Having opened for bands such as Black Joe Lewis & the Honeybears and Charles Bradley, The Relatives are best known for their musical resurrection, having reunited after thirty years of inactivity to produce two critically acclaimed albums. They have featured on NPR, The New York Times and had their single "Don't Let Me Fall" reissued by Daptone Records in 2014.

== History ==
A group that fuses gospel, funk, and psychedelic soul, the Relatives were formed in 1970, by Texas natives Reverend Gean West and Reverend Tommie West. After releasing three singles and opening for bands such as The Staple Singers and The Five Blind Boys of Mississippi, the Relatives broke up in 1980 due to lack of interest in their releases. Writing in The New York Times, James C. McKinley Jr. surmised that during their initial run "Their sound was too close to R&B for the church, too laden with gospel lyrics for R&B radio."

The Relatives were brought back together after producer Noel Waggener was handed a cracked copy of their 1971 EP "Don't Let Me Fall" by a friend's mother who had found it at a thrift shop. After Waggener and his partner tracked down Gean West to a church in Dallas, The Relatives reunited to play a concert in 2009 at The Continental Club in Austin, Texas. They released a compilation album titled Don't Let Me Fall, under Waggener's label Heavy Light Records in 2009.

They featured on the Black Joe Lewis & the Honeybears song "You Been Lyin", which was included on their 2011 album Scandalous.

The Relatives signed to the label Yep Roc Records in 2010 and recorded their first album, The Electric Word, with Spoon's Jim Eno as producer and Zach Ernst, formerly of Black Joe Lewis & the Honeybears, on guitar. The album was widely acclaimed with favorable reviews from The Observer, The Independent The Austin Chronicle and AllMusic. The album garnered national attention with NPR and The New York Times both running features on the band's reunion.

The Relative's second album, Goodbye World, would also be Gean West's last. Despite having been in a coma only a few weeks prior to recording, West insisted that God had sent him back to finish the album. He died on February 3, 2015, a week and a half after finishing the final recording. Goodbye World was released on April 29, 2016.

The Relatives continued to perform live shows despite the deaths of both West and Tony Corbitt, who along with Tyron Edwards was recruited at the start of The Relatives' comeback to replace former members. They opened for Charley Crockett in 2019. On 2 March 2024, The Relatives announced on Instagram that frontman Reverand Tommie West had died.

== Discography ==
=== Studio albums ===
- 2013 - The Electric Word - Yep Roc Records
- 2016 - Goodbye World - Luv N' Haight

=== EPs ===
- 1971 - "Speak to Me" / "Walking On" - Jewell Records
- 1971 - "Don't Let Me Fall" / "Rap On" - Hosanna Records
- 1976 - "This World Is Moving Too Fast" / "Free at Last" - Bix international
- 2013 - "Can't Feel Nothin'" / "No Man is an Island" - Luv N' Haight"

=== Singles ===
- 2013 - "Bad Trip" - Yep Roc Records
- 2013 - "Things are Changing" - Yep Roc Records
- 2014 - "Don't Let Me Fall" - Daptone Records,

=== Compilations ===
- 2009 - Don't Let Me Fall - Heavy Light Records
