= Electrified (Dressy Bessy album) =

Studio album by Dressy Bessy
- Released: June 14, 2005
- Genre: Pop, indie
- Label: Transdreamer
- Producer: Britt Myers

Dressy Bessy chronology
Dressy Bessy (2003)	Electrified (2005)	Holler and Stomp (2008)

Electrified is a studio album from Denver quartet Dressy Bessy. The album was released on Transdreamer Records in June 2005.

Professional ratings
Review scores
Source	Rating
AllMusic	3.5/5 stars
Pitchfork Media	6.3/10
Slant Magazine	3.5/5 stars

== Track listing ==
All tracks written by Tammy Ealom

1. "Side 2"
2. "Stop Foolin'"
3. "Electrified"
4. "Small"
5. "She Likes It"
6. "Who'd Stop the Rain"
7. "Hellohellohello"
8. "Ringalingaling"
9. "It Happens All the Time"
10. "Call It Even Later"
11. "Try Try Try Again"
12. "Second Place"
