= Japancakes =

American indie rock group

- Origin: Athens, Georgia, United States
- Genres: Indie rock Post-rock
- Years active: 1999–2017
- Labels: Kindercore Records; Darla Records; WARM

Japancakes was an American indie rock group, based in Athens, Georgia, United States.

== History ==
Rhythm guitarist Eric Berg formed the band with the idea of putting ten musicians in a band without any rehearsal, and performing a D chord for 45 minutes (similar to Terry Riley's In C). He continued performances with numerous instrumentalists before releasing their first recording If I Could See Dallas on Kindercore Records in 1999. The band settled into a consistent lineup on The Sleepy Strange, released in 2001, also on Kindercore. That lineup, which included pedal steel instrumentalist John Neff, drummer Brant Rackley, keyboardist Todd Kelly, bassist Nick Bielli, and cellist/keyboardist Heather MacIntosh (along with Eric Berg on guitar) also recorded 2002's Belmondo for California's Darla Records imprint. 2003 saw the departure of Todd Kelly, and 2004 saw the release of Waking Hours on the Athens label WARM Recordings.

Japancakes released two albums in fall 2007, Giving Machines and a cover of My Bloody Valentine's Loveless, both on Darla Records.

Their first three albums, If I Could See Dallas, Down the Elements, and The Sleepy Strange were re-released on Darla Records in February 2008.

The band independently released a self-titled album on May 6, 2016.

== Discography ==
- If I Could See Dallas (Kindercore, 1999)
- Down the Elements (Kindercore, 2000)
- The Sleepy Strange (Kindercore, 2001)
- Belmondo (Darla, 2002)
- Waking Hours (WARM, 2004)
- Giving Machines (Darla, 2007)
- Loveless [cover] (Darla, 2007)
- Japancakes (Self-released, 2016)
