= Barrence Whitfield =

American soul and R&B vocalist (born 1955)

- Born: Barry White; June 13, 1955 (age 70); Jacksonville, Florida, US
- Genres: R&B, soul, gospel
- Occupations: Musician, bandleader
- Instrument: Vocalist
- Years active: 1970s–present
- Labels: Rounder, New Rose, Munster, Bloodshot, Modern Harmonic, others
- Formerly of: The Savages; The Movers
- Website: Barrence Whitfield official site

Barrence Whitfield (born Barry White, June 13, 1955) is an American soul and R&B vocalist, best known as the frontman for Barrence Whitfield & the Savages.

White was born in Jacksonville, Florida. When he was a child, his family moved to East Orange, New Jersey, where he began singing in a gospel choir. While attending West Side High School he sang and played drums in rock, prog-rock, and funk bands.

== 1970s—1980s ==
In 1977, White enrolled at Boston University to study journalism. While in school, he worked in a record shop in Brookline, Massachusetts, named Good Vibrations, where his singing was heard by musician Peter Greenberg of the Lyres. White adopted the stage name Barrence Whitfield to avoid being mistaken for superstar Barry White and began performing with Greenberg and former members of the Lyres as Barrence Whitfield & the Savages. Alice Clark, in a 2015 profile, wrote that Barrence "adopted his Whitfield moniker in tribute to Motown producer Norman Whitfield."

The band garnered a strong reputation for explosive stage performances, described as "raucous and rough, in high gear from the moment they hit the stage." Whitfield himself was described as "a soul screamer in the spirit of Little Richard, Wilson Pickett, Solomon Burke, and early Don Covay." In 1984, the band released their self-titled debut album, mostly comprising cover versions of obscure soul and R&B songs. It received good critical reviews. The following year, they released a second album, Dig Yourself, on Rounder Records. Their music was heard by English radio DJ Andy Kershaw, who taped a Boston performance for airplay in Britain, and brought them to the UK for a tour.

Whitfield released a third album, Call of the Wild, in the UK in 1987, featuring a new band line-up; an expanded version, retitled Ow! Ow! Ow! was later issued in the US. He toured widely in Europe, and won supporting slots on US tours with such artists as Bo Diddley, Tina Turner, George Thorogood, Robert Cray, and Solomon Burke. Back home Whitfield earned seven Boston Music Awards. A live album, Live Emulsified, recorded in 1987–88, was followed by the album Let's Lose It, produced by Jim Dickinson and issued in France.

== 1990s—present ==
In the 1990s, Whitfield contributed tracks to Merle Haggard and Don Covay tribute albums, and recorded two albums with country music singer-songwriter Tom Russell. The album Ritual of the Savages was released in 1995. In 1997, he began working with a New Hampshire-based jump blues and rockabilly octet, the Movers. As well as continuing to perform in the UK and Europe, Whitfield has also contributed to film scores, including the 2007 film, Honeydripper.

In December 2010, Whitfield, Peter Greenberg (DMZ, Lyres, Customs), and Phil Lenker (Lyres) were joined by Andy Jody (Gazelles!, Pearlene, Oxford Cotton, Long Gones) and saxophonist Tom Quartulli to perform two live shows and record a new Barrence Whitfield and the Savages record. That album, Savage Kings, was released on Spanish Label Munster Records and in the US on Shake it Records. In 2013 Whitfield signed with Bloodshot Records, on which he issued Dig Thy Savage Soul in September 2013. Whitfield again toured Europe, including an appearance on the BBC's Jools Holland Show. A followup, Under the Savage Sky, was recorded in January 2015 at UltraSuede studios and released in August of that year; Whitfield described the album as "giving the kids a musical karate chop to the head." A third album for Bloodshot, Soul Flowers of Titan, was issued in 2018.

Barrence Whitfield and the Soul Savage Arkestra: Songs from the Sun Ra Cosmos was issued by Modern Harmonic on May 3, 2019. The album features idiosyncratic covers of songs composed by the Afrofuturist bandleader Sun Ra. Co-produced by Irwin Chusid and Brother Cleve and recorded over a span of 25 years, the album features collaborations with the Concussion Ensemble, Waitiki, Milton Reder (of Barrence Whitfield and the Savages and Four-Piece Suit), and others.

== Discography ==
- Barrence Whitfield and the Savages, Mamou, 1984
- Dig Yourself, Rounder, 1985
- Call of the Wild EP, UK Demon/Rounder, 1987
- Ow! Ow! Ow!, Rounder, 1987
- Live Emulsified, Rounder, 1989
- Let's Lose It, France, New Rose Records, 1990
- Savage Tracks, France, New Rose Records, 1992
- Cowboy Mambo (with Tom Russell), East Side Digital, 1993
- Hillbilly Voodoo (with Tom Russell), East Side Digital, 1993
- Ritual of the Savages, Ocean Music, 1995
- Savage Kings, Munster Records, 2011, rereleased Shake It Records
- Dig Thy Savage Soul, Bloodshot Records, 2013
- Under The Savage Sky, Bloodshot Records, 2015
- Soul Flowers of Titan, Bloodshot Records, 2018
- Barrence Whitfield and the Soul Savage Arkestra: Songs from the Sun Ra Cosmos, Modern Harmonic, 2019
- Glory, Folc (Spain), 2023
