= Cherry Peel =

Studio album by of Montreal
- Released: July 15, 1997
- Recorded: January – February 1997
- Genres: Twee pop; psychedelic folk; psychedelic pop
- Length: 35:52
- Label: Bar/None

Of Montreal chronology
Cherry Peel (1997)	The Bird Who Ate the Rabbit's Flower (1997)

Professional ratings
Review scores
Source	Rating
AllMusic	4/5 stars

Cherry Peel is the debut album of the Elephant 6 band of Montreal. It was released on Bar/None Records in 1997. In 1999 it was reissued with additional musical contributions and the songs remixed. All subsequent reissues contain this mix.

== Background ==
Prior to Cherry Peel, Barnes had made cassettes of 4-track recordings to share with friends and family. They had sent some tapes to independent record labels as well, and they ended up being signed by Bar/None Records.

Barnes was then given a budget of $3,000 to record an album. Bar/None partially gave the advance with the expectation that Jeff Mangum, the frontman of Neutral Milk Hotel who had just released the critical hit On Avery Island, would be co-producing. Mangum told Barnes that he would allow them to use his name to more easily get the deal but couldn't co-produce as he was busy.

Barnes had also befriended the other members of Neutral Milk Hotel, including Julian Koster, who helped Barnes record the album. During this time, of Montreal would join the Elephant 6 Recording Company.

Bar/None encouraged Barnes to record the album in a studio, but Kevin was used to the intimacy home recording and did not like the sound of '90s studio polish. They vyed for a contemporary 1960s folk-pop analog feel, akin to influences The Kinks and early Paul McCartney. They acquired an eight track quarter-inch reel-to-reel TASCAM to record the songs at home as they were used to doing. They also purchased multiple contact PCM mics and a tape machine from RadioShack, often using the internal microphone to give vocals a signature more distorted sound.

The live lineup of the time consisted of Kevin Barnes on vocals and guitar, Derek Almstead on drums and The Late B.P. Helium on bass. Songs recorded with this lineup consisted of "I Can't Stop Your Memory", "Sleeping in the Beetle Bug", "Montreal", and "You've Got a Gift". When the album was overdubbed and remixed in 1999, "Don't Ask Me to Explain" was also re-recorded by this band, the original version being a solo four track recording. The rest of the songs were recorded entirely by Kevin.

The majority of the songs were written prior to the recording of the album, some of them being the songs presented to the label as four track recordings before Kevin was signed. Tracks that weren't re-recorded ended up being released on The Early Four Track Recordings compilation. "Everything Disappears When You Come Around" and "Baby" were written during the recording process of the album.

"When You're Loved Like You Are" was written about Barnes' uncle, who was dying at the time of cancer. He left Barnes $7,000 which they would later use to buy another tape machine, on which The Gay Parade and Coquelicot Asleep in the Poppies: A Variety of Whimsical Verse were recorded. Many of the songs, including "Don't Ask Me to Explain" and "Montreal", are about Barnes' pen pal from Montreal, Julie, after whom the band is named. Barnes drove to Montreal to see her in person, but it ended poorly. The experience devastated Kevin and became the lyrical inspiration behind the bulk of early of Montreal material.

"Tim I Wish You Were Born a Girl" was the first song written for the album, about Barnes' friend Tim Root. "In Dreams I Dance With You", "I Was Watching Your Eyes" and "At Night Trees Aren't Sleeping" were written about another friend, Orenda. "You've Got a Gift" was written for Julian as a thank you for helping them throughout the making of the album.

Due to the personal lyrics and complicated chord progressions, Barnes saw Cherry Peel as a more serious, introspective work than some critics and listeners did, denouncing the twee pop moniker it tends to be associated with. This, as well as the toll the failed Montreal relationship took, led to less personal, more abstract lyrical content and frantic musical styles from The Gay Parade until Satanic Panic in the Attic.

== Track listing ==
All tracks are written by Kevin Barnes.

No.	Title	Length
1.	"Everything Disappears When You Come Around"	2:33
2.	"Baby"	2:31
3.	"I Can't Stop Your Memory"	3:25
4.	"When You're Loved Like You Are"	2:33
5.	"Don't Ask Me to Explain"	2:46
6.	"In Dreams I Dance with You"	2:05
7.	"Sleeping in the Beetle Bug"	2:18
8.	"Tim I Wish You Were Born a Girl"	1:46
9.	"Montreal"	2:30
10.	"This Feeling (Derek's Theme)"	2:42
11.	"I Was Watching Your Eyes"	1:51
12.	"Springtime Is the Season"	2:13
13.	"At Night Trees Aren't Sleeping"	1:49
14.	"You've Got a Gift"	4:50
Total length:		35:52

== Credits ==
of Montreal

- Kevin Barnes – vocals, guitar (all); bass, drums (tracks 1, 2, 4, 5 (Note: Original 1997 release only.), 6, 8, 10, 11, 12, 13)
- Bryan Poole – bass, vocals (tracks 3, 5 (Note: 1999 reissue and subsequent releases.), 7, 9, 14)
- Derek Almstead – drums, vocals (tracks 3, 5, 7, 9, 14)

Production

- Park Peters – mastering
- Tim Root – front and back cover artwork
- Dave Barnes – artwork
