= The Bird Who Ate the Rabbit's Flower =

EP by of Montreal
- Released: 1997
- Genre: Twee pop
- Length: 16:49
- Label: Kindercore

Of Montreal chronology
Cherry Peel (1997)	The Bird Who Ate the Rabbit's Flower (1997)	The Bedside Drama: A Petite Tragedy (1998)

Professional ratings
Review scores
Source	Rating
AllMusic	3/5 stars
Pitchfork Media	(7.5/10)

The Bird Who Ate the Rabbit's Flower is an EP by indie rock band of Montreal. The five tracks were later re-released on The Bird Who Continues to Eat the Rabbit's Flower.

== Track listing ==
No.	Title	Length
1.	"You Are An Airplane"	4:25
2.	"The Inner Light"	3:24
3.	"When a Man Is in Love with a Man"	2:22
4.	"If I Faltered Slightly Twice"	2:29
5.	"Disguises"	4:09
Total length:		16:49

== Personnel ==
- Derek Almstead – drums, vocals
- Bryan Poole – bass, vocals
- Kevin Barnes – guitar, vocals
