= Disguises (The Who song) =

1966 song by the Who

Song by the Who

from the EP Ready Steady Who
- Released: 11 November 1966
- Recorded: 31 July – 1 August 1966
- Studio: IBC Studios, London
- Genre: Raga rock; hard rock
- Length: 3:11 (mono); 3:20 (stereo)
- Label: Reaction
- Songwriter: Pete Townshend
- Producer: Kit Lambert

"Disguises" is a song by the English rock band the Who, written by guitarist Pete Townshend, and first released on the group's 1966 extended play Ready Steady Who. It, along with "I'm a Boy" are of the earliest compositions in which Townshend questions gender identity and identity crisis', a prevalent aspect found later in his songwriting. "Disguises" and "I'm a Boy" also marks the first time Kit Lambert received credit as a record producer for the Who, something that had previously been credited to Shel Talmy and Townshend.

The thematic concept for the song proved successful and Townshend was subsequently praised by critics. It has since been covered by the Jam as the B-side for their top-five single "Funeral Pyre" in 1981 and Of Montreal for their 1997 EP The Bird Who Ate the Rabbit's Flower.

== Recording ==
Both "Disguises" and "I'm a Boy" were written to be parts of a concept album titled Quads, in which parents would be able to choose the gender of their children. However, this idea was later discarded and the pair of songs are the only ones that survived. They were first attempted on 14 June 1966 as demos, And were worked on for some months, before being recorded on 31 July to 1 August of the same year. Paul Clay was the studio engineer for the recording. The previously mentioned backing track would later go on to be mimed by the band the following day, on 15 June for their final appearance on the television show A Whole Scene Going, in which Townshend appears with a false handlebar moustache. Following this performance, rumours started circulating that this would become their next single, as the band then also played it on their next appearance on Ready Steady Go.

It is one of the earliest songs recorded by them that features claves, played by drummer Keith Moon, who would also later use them on "Magic Bus" in 1968. French horn is featured in a distinct solo played by bass guitarist John Entwistle. "Disguises" was never performed live by the band. The only live recording of the song originates from a session the Who recorded on 13 September, which was later broadcast on 17 September for an episode of Saturday Club. This version, apparently recorded as a joke, ends with Moon smashing his drums, interrupting presenter Brian Matthew, much to the bands' approval, with Matthew exclaiming "I see". This version can be found on their 2000 compilation album BBC Sessions.

== Release and reception ==
"Disguises" remained unreleased for about three months, following a failure in securing the rights for a live EP recorded live from the Who's Ready Steady Go! TV-Special entitled Ready Steady Who! Reaction Records would then compile some previously unissued tracks and released them on Ready Steady Who. Although a nod to the TV-Special, it was completely unaffiliated with the show. In the US, it remained unissued for well over two years, before finally getting its first official release in the September 1968 compilation album Magic Bus: The Who on Tour, where the mono version was used. The songs was mixed in stereo, but never released in this format, which remained unreleased for about thirty years, before getting its first official release on Thirty Years of Maximum R&B in 1994. The stereo version is nine seconds longer than the mono version, since the fade out in the latter comes in quicker.

It was heavily praised for its innovative and original concept, most notably its use of reverb and feedback, which the group was well known for. John Atkins writes in his Biography of the group The Who on Record: A Critical History, 1963-1998, that "Disguises" was an inventive track based on a droning guitar figure drenched in reverb. He also mentions the influences of raga rock found in the track, possibly inspired by "See My Friends" by the Kinks. Mentions of the departure of rhythm and blues and venture into Psychedelia in the group's sound is also evident in "Disguises". In the AllMusic review of Ready Steady Who, Richie Unterberger states that "Rounding things off was a quite good Townshend original, "Disguises," that played around his early themes of identity confusion. It was too good to be a cast-off on an EP". It is also highlighted in the review of Magic Bus: The Who On Tour.

Ultimate Classic Rock ranked "Disguises" number 63 on their list of All 245 Who Songs Ranked Worst To Best, citing that "Waves of audio interference dovetail with Townshend’s lyrics about a girl who camouflages herself to get away from a suitor. “Disguises” is both a refreshing take on an unrequited love song and a strange way to record a plucky pop song. The whooshing sheets of noise bring a surreal quality that remains unsettling." ULR also ranked it as number ten on their list of Top 10 Underrated Who Songs.

== Personnel ==
=== The Who ===
- Roger Daltrey – lead vocals
- John Entwistle – bass guitar, french horn, harmony vocals
- Pete Townshend – lead guitar, harmony vocals
- Keith Moon – drums, tambourine, claves

=== Technical ===
- Kit Lambert – producer
- Paul Clay – studio engineer
