= The Sunlandic Twins =

Studio album by of Montreal
- Released: April 12, 2005
- Recorded: May 2004 – October 2004
- Genre: Indie pop, funk, synth-pop, neo-psychedelia
- Length: 41:24
- Label: Polyvinyl
- Producer: Kevin Barnes

Of Montreal chronology
The Gladiator Nightstick Collection (2004)	The Sunlandic Twins (2005)	Deflated Chime, Foals Slightly Flower Sibylline Responses (2006)

Professional ratings
Aggregate scores
Source	Rating
Metacritic	80/100
Review scores
Source	Rating
AllMusic	4/5 stars
Alternative Press	4/5
Entertainment Weekly	B−
The Independent	4/5 stars
Mojo	3/5 stars
NME	8/10
Pitchfork	6.4/10
Q	3/5 stars
Stylus Magazine	A−
URB	4/5 stars

The Sunlandic Twins is the seventh album by indie pop band of Montreal. The album continues further into the more electronic territory first explored on 2004's Satanic Panic in the Attic. It was recorded almost entirely by Kevin Barnes, the band's singer and songwriter, in Athens, GA and Oslo, Norway throughout 2004.

== Background ==
Initial pressings of the album contained a bonus EP featuring four new tracks. One of them, "Keep Sending Me Black Fireworks," features Barnes' then-wife Nina on vocals, while "Art Snob Solutions" features the same instrumental track as the earlier "Will You Let Me into Your Dream". The double vinyl edition of the album included an additional bonus track, "Family Nouveau". The title of "So Begins Our Alabee" refers to the couple's daughter, Alabee Barnes, who is also the partial subject of "Family Nouveau", along with Nina.

"Wraith Pinned to the Mist and Other Games" was featured as a re-recorded jingle in a television commercial for Outback Steakhouse, with altered lyrics. This surprised some fans. Barnes claimed the income would go towards the band's next tour. "Wraith Pinned to the Mist and Other Games" was also featured in the movie Cloverfield and in the American TV series Weeds. "Everyday Feels Like Sunday", from the bonus EP, was featured on a NASDAQ commercial.

As with the previous six albums, David Barnes, Kevin's brother, created all the artwork for The Sunlandic Twins, including the album cover and an etching on the B-side of the vinyl edition.

Videos were made for "Requiem for O.M.M.2", "So Begins Our Alabee", and "Wraith Pinned to the Mist and Other Games".

== Track listing ==
All songs written by Kevin Barnes.

1. "Requiem for O.M.M.2" – 2:19
2. "I Was Never Young" – 3:30
3. "Wraith Pinned to the Mist and Other Games" – 4:15
4. "Forecast Fascist Future" – 4:22
5. "So Begins Our Alabee" – 4:15
6. "Our Spring Is Sweet Not Fleeting" – 1:02
7. "The Party's Crashing Us" – 4:53
8. "Knight Rider" – 1:06
9. "I Was a Landscape in Your Dream" – 3:05
10. "Death of a Shade of a Hue" – 2:54
11. "Oslo in the Summertime" – 3:21
12. "October Is Eternal" – 3:58
13. "The Repudiated Immortals" – 2:18

=== Bonus EP ===
1. "Art Snob Solutions" – 3:24
2. "The Actor's Opprobrium" – 2:36
3. "Keep Sending Me Black Fireworks" – 3:29
4. "Everyday Feels Like Sunday" – 3:19
5. "Family Nouveau" – 2:21
