= It's a Beautiful Thing =

It's a Beautiful Thing may refer to:

- It's a Beautiful Thing (album), a 1999 album by Keith Murray
- "It's a Beautiful Thing" (Ocean Colour Scene song), 1997
- "It's a Beautiful Thing" (Paul Brandt song), 1999, also released as "Love Is a Beautiful Thing" by Phil Vassar in 2007
- "It's a Beautiful Thing" (Tammin song), 2005
