= Tammy Ealom =

American singer-songwriter

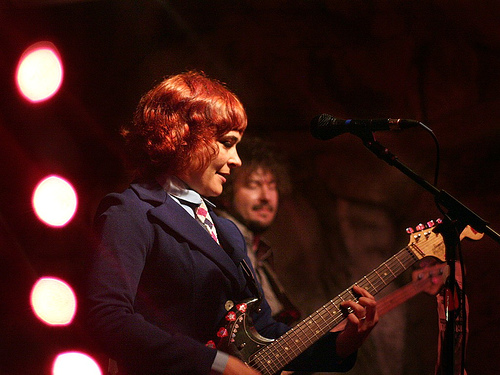
- Ealom in 2008
- Born: Tamaira Jane Atherton; December 3, 1968 (age 57); Rochester, Minnesota, US
- Occupation: Singer-songwriter
- Years active: 1996–present

Tammy Ealom is the guitarist, vocalist, and principal songwriter for the indie rock band Dressy Bessy. In 2017 she began performing solo acoustic shows under her online moniker Tammy Shine. She was formerly a member of The Minders and 40th Day. Although the band didn't display the logo, they were part of the collective The Elephant 6 Recording Company, which included The Apples in Stereo, Neutral Milk Hotel, The Olivia Tremor Control, of Montreal, Beulah, The Minders, The Essex Green, and others.

== Personal life ==
Tamaira Jane Atherton was born in Rochester, Minnesota, December 3, 1968. Her parents, Terry Atherton and Mary Beth Lewis moved the family several times while her father served in the U.S. Army. The family lived in Rochester, Minnesota, Winona, Minnesota, Germany, and Hawaii, before settling in Colorado Springs, Colorado. Ealom currently lives in Denver, Colorado and is married to John Hill. Her immediate family include, daughter, Tayla Ealom, mother, Beth Atherton, and brother, Tim Atherton. Her mother and brother own and operate a record store in Colorado Springs called Earth Pig Music that was originally started by her father Terry.

== Dressy Bessy ==
After leaving The Minders in 1996, Ealom formed Dressy Bessy when she met drummer Darren Albert in a record store in Colorado Springs, CO. They formed a three-piece group with Albert's childhood friend, bassist Rob Greene ( d. 2018). Rob Greene was originally a guitar player, but Ealom considered him too skilled for her indie project and insisted he start playing bass. John Hill, who had been helping with the early recordings joined the band in 1997.

== Art and photography ==
During her high school years she worked at a 24-hour film developing lab, where she honed her skills at photography. She later worked extensively as a fashion photographer for local talent agencies, before dedicating herself to music in 2000. In 1997 a good friend introduced her to Adobe Photoshop and she quickly became known for her colorful, high contrast photos and graphics. She is highly skilled at photo retouching and is known as a portrait photographer. Tammy has also created most of the artwork and photography for her band Dressy Bessy.
