= Coquelicot Asleep in the Poppies: A Variety of Whimsical Verse =

Studio album by of Montreal
- Released: April 23, 2001
- Recorded: H. Hare Studios, October 1999/November 2000
- Genre: Psychedelic pop • progressive pop
- Length: 70:08
- Label: Kindercore
- Producer: Kevin Barnes

Of Montreal chronology
| The Early Four Track Recordings (2001) | Coquelicot Asleep in the Poppies: A Variety of Whimsical Verse (2001) | An Introduction to Of Montreal (2001) |

Professional ratings
Aggregate scores
| Source | Rating |
|---|---|
| Metacritic | 84/100 |
Review scores
| Source | Rating |
| Allmusic | 4.5/5 stars |
| Pitchfork Media | (8.0/10) |
| PopMatters | (favorable) |

Coquelicot Asleep in the Poppies: A Variety of Whimsical Verse is the fourth full-length album by psychedelic pop band of Montreal, released in 2001 by Kindercore Records. The record is more of a full band recording than previous of Montreal albums.

The majority of the songs on the album tell bizarre stories about invented characters. "The Events Leading Up to the Collapse of Detective Dulllight" is a spoken word track. As a whole, the album is a loose concept album inspired by the Beach Boys' Smile, Frank Zappa's We're Only in It for the Money, and Os Mutantes.

== Background ==
In an interview to the American zine ZUM, frontman Kevin Barnes said: "Coquelicot is an Efeblum. An Efeblum is a fairy-like creature who is employed by the Efeneties (loving spirits) to place bells inside people's hearts. When a person has a bell in their heart they are able to create works of art, fall in love and feel at peace with the world. Coquelicot, during one of her trips to Earth, decides to discard her bells and experience life as a human. Instead of living in "reality" she decides to experience life in a sleeping unconscious/conscious state. It is in this subconscious world that she meets Claude and Lecithin the inventor. They do all sorts of crazy stuff together like having incredible battles with evergreens and satellites, getting chased by psychotic zombies, playing with Lecithin's inventions and eventually moving away together to a deserted frozen island. In time, Coquelicot feels remorseful about neglecting her responsibilities as an Efeblum and decides to return to her work. She can't bear the thought of leaving her two new best friends so she invites them to come along with her. They happily [accept] and join her as honorary Efeblums."

== Track listing ==
All tracks are written by Kevin Barnes.

| No. | Title | Length |
|---|---|---|
| 1. | "Good Morning Mr. Edminton" | 2:45 |
| 2. | "Peacock Parasols" | 2:54 |
| 3. | "Look at the Bell (Andy Instructs the Turkish Moths to Acquire Him More Bells or Else...)" | 1:43 |
| 4. | "An Introduction for Isabell" | 3:49 |
| 5. | "Let's Do Everything for the First Time Forever" | 2:38 |
| 6. | "Coquelicot's Tea Party" | 0:43 |
| 7. | "Rose Robert" | 2:26 |
| 8. | "It's a Very Starry Night" | 3:50 |
| 9. | "Mimi Merlot" | 2:57 |
| 10. | "Butterscotching Mr. Lynn" | 1:38 |
| 11. | "Coquelicot, Claude and Lecithin Dance Aboard the Ocean Liner" | 1:03 |
| 12. | "Go Call You Mine" | 1:29 |
| 13. | "The Events Leading Up to the Collapse of Detective Dulllight" | 2:41 |
| 14. | "Penelope" | 2:53 |
| 15. | "A Dreamy Day of Daydreaming of You" | 2:01 |
| 16. | "Hello from Inside a Shell (Zombies Enter the Harbor)" | 3:37 |
| 17. | "Lecithin's Tale of a DNA Experiment That Went Horribly Awry" | 3:14 |
| 18. | "It's Just So" | 2:37 |
| 19. | "The Frozen Island" | 3:58 |
| 20. | "Upon Settling on the Frozen Island, Lecithin Presents Claude and Coquelicot With His Animal Creations for Them to Approve or Reject (The Rejected Inventions Walk Towards the Reverse Magnetizer)" | 1:07 |
| 21. | "Let's Go for a Walk (Coquelicot Leaves the Frozen Island to Resume Her Work as an Efeblum With Claude and Lecithin in Tow)" | 2:11 |
| 22. | "The Hopeless Opus or The Great Battle of the Unfriendly Ridiculous" | 17:54 |
| Total length: | | 1:10:08 |

Japanese edition
| No. | Title | Length |
|---|---|---|
| 23. | "Inside a Room Full of Treasures, a Black Pygmi Horse’s Head Pops Up Like a Periscope" |
| 24. | "Neru No Daisuke" |

== Personnel ==
- Kevin Barnes
- Dottie Alexander
- Derek Almstead
- Jamey Huggins
- Andy Gonzales
- Glenn Schick - Mastering

== See also ==
- SUMonline Interviews (2000); of Montreal, by Jeremy Crown
