= The Bedside Drama: A Petite Tragedy =

Studio album by of Montreal
- Released: 1998
- Genre: Indie pop • twee pop
- Length: 39:29
- Label: Kindercore

Of Montreal chronology
The Bird Who Ate the Rabbit's Flower (1997)	The Bedside Drama: A Petite Tragedy (1998)	The Gay Parade (1999)

Professional ratings
Review scores
Source	Rating
AllMusic	4/5 stars
Pitchfork Media	6.0/10

The Bedside Drama: A Petite Tragedy is the second album by the band of Montreal. It was released on Kindercore Records in 1998.

== Background ==
The Bedside Drama was recorded in tandem with The Gay Parade, intended to be one triple album. Kevin quickly realized that the two groups of songs formed their own unique identities and separated them into their own records. The album was done on the same eight track reel-to-reel TASCAM recorder as Cherry Peel. Influences include The Beach Boys' Smile, The Kinks Are the Village Green Preservation Society, The Who Sell Out, Frank Zappa, psychedelic era Beatles, and Os Mutantes. It is a concept album detailing the rise and fall of a romance and becoming suicidal as a result, inspired by Kevin's failed relationship with the band's namesake, Julie, their pen pal from Montreal. Though the album's narrative parallels to Kevin's life are obvious, much of it is idealized and dramatized in an early attempt to escape into fantasy worlds, and as a reaction to the general dismissal Cherry Peel's lyrics had gotten. Subsequent albums would stray even further from Kevin's personal life.

== Critical reception ==
SF Weekly thought that "when the band's sound jells ... Of Montreal easily hold its own alongside such pop adventurers as Brian Wilson and Harry Nilsson."

AllMusic wrote: "A continuation and maturation of the playfulness exhibited on earlier releases, Of Montreal create a brand of theatrical psychedelic pop that many of their '60s predecessors hinted at but only a few achieved."

== Track listing ==
All tracks are written by Kevin Barnes.

No.	Title	Length
1.	"One Of A Very Few Of A Kind"	1:38
2.	"Happy Yellow Bumblebee"	2:17
3.	"Little Viola Hidden in the Orchestra"	3:37
4.	"The Couple's First Kiss"	1:28
5.	"Sing You a Love You Song"	2:36
6.	"Honeymoon in San Francisco"	2:35
7.	"The Couple in Bed Together Under a Warm Blanket Wrapped Up in Each Other's Arms Asleep"	1:24
8.	"Cutie Pie"	2:19
9.	"Panda Bear"	4:48
10.	"Sadness Creeping Up and Scaring Away the Couple's Happiness"	1:29
11.	"Please Tell Me So"	2:19
12.	"My Darling, I've Forgotten"	2:11
13.	"If You Feel You Must Go, Don't Go!"	2:07
14.	"Just Recently Lost Something of Importance"	2:25
15.	"The Hollow Room"	1:47
16.	"It's Easy to Sleep When You're Dead"	4:29
Total length:		39:29

The Japanese release contained two bonus tracks which appear on the United States release of Horse & Elephant Eatery (No Elephants Allowed): The Singles and Songles Album.

1. "In the Army Kid"
2. "Montreal Makes Me Sad Again (also known as "Julie the Mouse")"
