= Big Sandy & His Fly-Rite Boys =

American band (1988–1998, 1999–present)

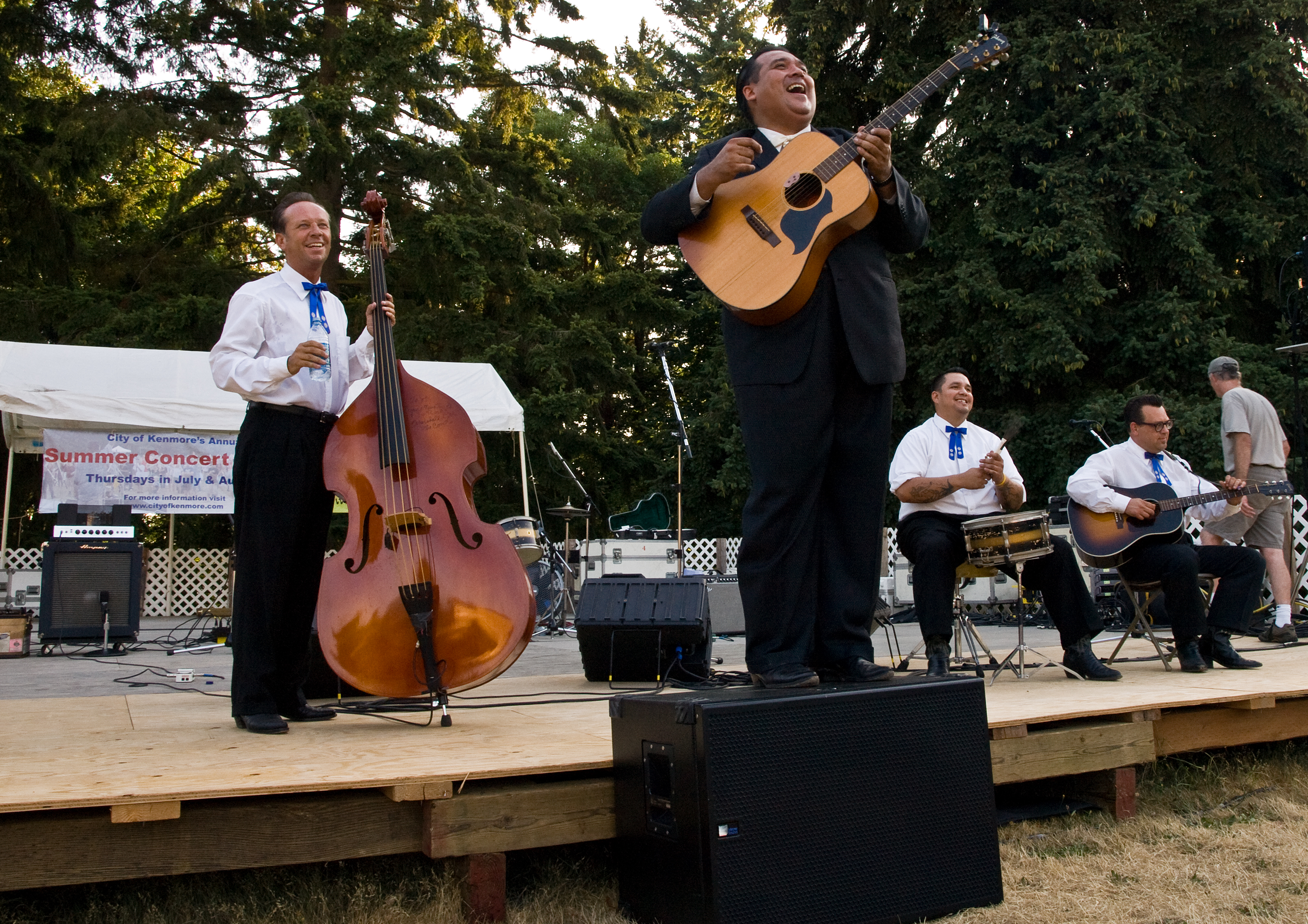
- Big Sandy & His Fly-Rite Boys in 2009

Background information
- Genres: Rockabilly; Western swing; bluegrass; Cajun; country; folk; folk rock; mariachi; rock and roll; swing
- Years active: 1988-1998; 1999-present
- Labels: Hightone Records, Yep Roc Records, Jeems Records
- Website: www.bigsandy.net

Big Sandy & His Fly-Rite Boys is an American rockabilly and Western swing band from California composed of Robert Williams, alias Big Sandy, Ashley Kingman, Frankie Hernandez and Russell Scott. The band is known for its eclectic style, which also encompasses folk, bluegrass, Cajun, country, mariachi and rock and roll, as well as swing and folk rock.

Robert Williams grew up listening to jump blues records from his parents' collection, and subsequently performed with neo-rockabilly bands in southern California in the 1980s before forming the Fly-Rite Boys band as a trio in 1988. After recording two albums as Big Sandy & the Fly-Rite Trio, the band expanded its line-up and released its official debut studio album, Jumping from 6 to 6, in 1994. Swingin' West, the band's second album, was released the following year, and featured more prominent Western swing influences than the band's debut. After releasing a more eclectic sounding album, Feelin' Kinda Lucky, in 1997, the band went on hiatus, and released the instrumental album Big Sandy Presents the Fly-Rite Boys in 1998, followed by the Big Sandy solo album Dedicated to You, a cover album consisting of R&B and doo-wop songs, before the band reunited in 1999 to record the EP Radio Favorites.

Former members include Joe Perez, Jeff West, Bobby Trimble, TK Smith, Carl Leyland, Lee Jeffriess, and Wally Hersom. The band has been inducted into the Rockabilly Hall of Fame.

In 2024, Robert Williams (aka Big Sandy) both covered the song "Kiss the Girl" and provided the voice of Romeo McGrowl (originally named Liver Lips McGrowl in the original Country Bear show) in the re-vamped Country Bear Musical Jamboree at Walt Disney World's Magic Kingdom.

Studio albums

- Jumping from 6 to 6 (Hightone Records, 1994)
- Swingin' West (Hightone, 1995)
- Feelin' Kinda Lucky (Hightone, 1997)
- Night Tide (Hightone, 2000)
- It's Time! (Yep Roc Records, 2003)
- Turntable Matinee (Yep Roc, 2006)
- What A Dream It's Been (Razor & Tie, 2013)

Other albums

- Fly Right with Big Sandy & the Fly-Rite Trio (Dionysus, 1990)
- On the Go (No Hit Records, 1993; re-released on Jeems Records, 2002)
- Big Sandy Presents the Fly-Rite Boys (Hightone, 1998)
- Dedicated to You (Big Sandy only; Hightone, 1998)
- Radio Favorites (EP; Hightone, 1999)
