= Ben Vaughn =

American musician

- Born: 1955 or 1956 (age 70–71); Mount Ephraim, New Jersey, U.S.
- Origin: Collingswood, New Jersey, U.S.
- Genres: Rock, folk, blues, country, instrumental rock
- Occupations: Singer, songwriter, musician, record producer, composer, radio host
- Instruments: Vocals, guitar, harmonica, drums, bass, keyboards
- Years active: 1983–2025
- Website: benvaughn.com

Ben Vaughn (born 1955 or 1956) is an American singer, songwriter, musician, record producer, composer for television and film, and a syndicated radio show host.

== Biography ==
Vaughn grew up in Mount Ephraim, New Jersey, outside Philadelphia, and graduated from Audubon High School. He lived in Collingswood, New Jersey for several years before moving to California. At age 6, his uncle gave him a Duane Eddy record and forever changed his life. He started playing the drums in a garage band when he was 12, then transitioned to the guitar. After school, he would go to a local department store, where he would borrow the guitars and practice over chord sheets.

In 1983, he formed the Ben Vaughn Combo. The band was together for five years, releasing two albums and touring the U.S. several times. They received rave reviews in Rolling Stone and People magazines as well as video airplay on MTV. The attention inspired Marshall Crenshaw to record Vaughn's "I'm Sorry (But So Is Brenda Lee)" for his Downtown album.

Vaughn embarked on a solo career in 1988, recording several critically acclaimed albums, touring extensively in Europe and the U.S., and receiving more MTV exposure. During that period he produced three records for the Elektra Records American Explorer series (Memphis rockabilly legend Charlie Feathers, Muscle Shoals country soul singer Arthur Alexander) and recorded "Cubist Blues" a collaboration with Alan Vega and Alex Chilton. He also scored two films (Favorite Mopar and Wild Girl's Go-Go Rama), as well as appeared as a frequent guest commentator on nationally syndicated radio shows Fresh Air and World Cafe.

In 1995, Vaughn moved to L.A. and released "Instrumental Stylings," an album of instrumentals in a variety of styles. A guest appearance on KCRW's "Morning Becomes Eclectic" led directly to being hired as the composer for the hit TV sitcom 3rd Rock from the Sun. That '70s Show soon followed, and for the next ten years, Vaughn would provide music for a dozen other TV shows and pilots (Men Behaving Badly, Normal, Ohio, Grounded for Life). He also provided scores for several films (Psycho Beach Party, The Independent, Scorpion Spring) and continued producing records (Ween, Los Straitjackets, Mark Olson of the Jayhawks, Nancy Sinatra, and the Swingers soundtrack CD).

In 1997 Vaughn released the album Rambler '65. Recorded entirely in his car in the driveway of his home in New Jersey, this album (and subsequent short film) is still considered by many to be a classic document of a man and his dream. Vaughn turned his 1965 Rambler American into a makeshift recording studio whose equipment list includes two quarts of Quaker State oil.

Since then, Vaughn has released Designs in Music, Vaughn Sings Vaughn Vols. 1-3, Texas Road Trip (recorded in Austin, Texas, with Doug Sahm's band), Five by Five, and Piece de Resistance by the Ben Vaughn Quintet, and the solo acoustic album Imitation Wood Grain and Other Folk Songs. His most recent release, The World of Ben Vaughn, coincided with Record Store Day 2022. Vaughn also had an Italian dance hit (a DJ re-mix of "Hey Romeo"), and his song "Jerry Lewis in France" was played on Bob Dylan's radio program (complete with Dylan's recitation of Vaughn's resume).

Occasionally, Vaughn takes a break from his syndicated radio show (The Many Moods of Ben Vaughn) to perform live in the US and Europe. He toured Spain in June 2022.

== Discography ==
- The Many Moods of Ben Vaughn (1986) (Restless – US) (Making Waves – UK)
- Beautiful Thing (1987) (Restless – US) (EMI – UK, Europe)
- Ben Vaughn Blows Your Mind (1988) (Restless – US) (Virgin – UK, Europe) (DRO – Spain)
- Dressed in Black (1990) (Enigma – US) (Demon – UK, Europe)
- Mood Swings (1991) (Restless – US) (Demon – UK, Europe)
- Mono US (1992) (Bar None – US) (Club De Musique – Italy) (Sky Ranch – France)
- Instrumental Stylings (1995) (Bar None – US)
- Cubist Blues (1996), with Alan Vega and Alex Chilton (Thirsty Ear – US) (Last Call – France), (reissued by Light In the Attic – US, Munster – Spain in 2006 with an extra disc recorded live)
- Rambler '65 (1997) (Rhino – US) (Munster – Spain)
- The Prehistoric Ben Vaughn (1998) (Munster – Spain)
- A Date with Ben Vaughn (1999) (Shoeshine – UK)
- Glasgow Time (2002) (Shoeshine – UK)
- Designs in Music (2005) (Soundstage 15 – US) (Munster – Spain)
- Vaughn Sings Vaughn, Vol.1 (2006) (Many Moods Records – US)
- Vaughn Sings Vaughn, Vol. 2 (2007) (Many Moods Records – US)
- Vaughn Sings Vaughn, Vol. 3 (2007) (Many Moods Records – US)
- Texas Road Trip (2014) (Many Moods Records – US)
- Five by Five (2015) (Many Moods Records – US)
- Piece De Resistance (2016) (Many Moods Records – US / Kizmiaz Records – France)
- Imitation Wood Grain and Other Folk Songs (2018) (Many Moods Records – US)
- The World of Ben Vaughn (2022) (Relay Shack Records – US)
- Magnetic East: The Deer Tick Sessions (2026) (Yep Roc - US)
