= Satanic Panic in the Attic =

Studio album by Of Montreal
- Released: April 6, 2004
- Recorded: August 2003–January 2004
- Genre: Psychedelic pop
- Length: 43:33
- Label: Polyvinyl
- Producer: Kevin Barnes

Of Montreal chronology
| If He Is Protecting Our Nation, Then Who Will Protect Big Oil, Our Children? (2003) | Satanic Panic in the Attic (2004) | The Gladiator Nightstick Collection (2004) |

Satanic Panic in the Attic is the sixth album released by the band of Montreal. The album, like later albums The Sunlandic Twins and Hissing Fauna, Are You The Destroyer?, was made almost entirely by Kevin Barnes, and was the first to explore the dance and funk rhythms that would define their subsequent work.

The cover artwork is done by the singer/songwriter's brother, David Barnes, with insert art by then-wife Nina Barnes. The cover art is a psychedelic parody of El Greco's The Burial of the Count of Orgaz.

A 10th anniversary edition of the album was released exclusively on vinyl for Record Store Day 2014. The release contains the original album on 180g yellow vinyl as well as a 180g light blue vinyl disc with bonus tracks recorded around the same time as the album.

== Critical reception ==
Professional ratings
Aggregate scores
| Source | Rating |
|---|---|
| Metacritic | 78/100 |
Review scores
| Source | Rating |
| AllMusic | 4.5/5 stars |
| Alternative Press | 4/5 |
| NME | 8/10 |
| Pitchfork | 8.3/10 |
| Rolling Stone | 3/5 stars |
| Stylus Magazine | B+ |

In August 2009, the webzine Pitchfork named "Disconnect the Dots" the 260th track in their staff list "The Top 500 Tracks of the 2000s".

== Track listing ==
All tracks are written by Kevin Barnes, except where noted.

| No. | Title | Lyrics | Music | Length |
|---|---|---|---|---|
| 1. | "Disconnect the Dots" | | | 4:25 |
| 2. | "Lysergic Bliss" | | | 4:04 |
| 3. | "Will You Come and Fetch Me" | | | 1:59 |
| 4. | "My British Tour Diary" | | | 2:19 |
| 5. | "Rapture Rapes the Muses" | | | 3:03 |
| 6. | "Eros' Entropic Tundra" | | | 3:12 |
| 7. | "City Bird" | Dan Donahue | Kevin Barnes | 2:20 |
| 8. | "Erroneous Escape into Eric Eckles" | | | 2:48 |
| 9. | "Chrissy Kiss the Corpse" | | | 2:40 |
| 10. | "Your Magic Is Working" | | | 3:42 |
| 11. | "Climb the Ladder" | | | 3:26 |
| 12. | "How Lester Lost His Wife" | | | 2:31 |
| 13. | "Spike the Senses" | | | 3:11 |
| 14. | "Vegan in Furs" | | | 3:53 |

Japanese edition bonus track
| No. | Title | Length |
|---|---|---|
| 15. | "Katie and Caroline" |
| 16. | "An Epistle to a Pathological Creep" |

Initial pressing bonus disc
| No. | Title | Length |
|---|---|---|
| 1. | "Know Your Onion!" (The Shins cover) |
| 2. | "Spanish Dance Troupe" (Gorky's Zygotic Mynci cover) |
| 3. | "Delinquency" (V Twin cover) |
| 4. | "Color Me In" (Broadcast cover) |

10th anniversary edition bonus LP
| No. | Title | Length |
|---|---|---|
| 15. | "Color Me In" | 1:58 |
| 16. | "The Pimps Are Simpering" | 3:15 |
| 17. | "Delinquency" | 2:26 |
| 18. | "An Epistle to a Pathological Creep" | 4:16 |
| 19. | "Know Your Onion!" | 2:28 |
| 20. | "Everything About Her Is Wrong" | 3:02 |
| 21. | "Spanish Dance Troupe" | 2:55 |
