= Mark Linett =

American record producer and audio engineer

- Occupations: Record producer, audio engineer
- Years active: 1970s–present

Mark Linett is an American record producer and audio engineer who is best known for his remixing and remastering of the Beach Boys' catalog. He is based in Glendale, California, where he owns a private studio, Your Place or Mine Recording. From 1988 onward, he was the principal engineer for Brian Wilson's recordings. He has also worked with Red Hot Chili Peppers, Jane's Addiction, Los Lobos, Rickie Lee Jones and Randy Newman.

== The Beach Boys ==
In 1996, he created the first true stereo mix of the Beach Boys' 1966 album Pet Sounds and has co-produced nearly all of the band's archival releases, including The Pet Sounds Sessions (1997), Endless Harmony Soundtrack (1998), Hawthorne, CA (2003), and The Smile Sessions (2011) as well as the Feel Flows (2021) and Sail On Sailor (2022) box sets. In addition to earning three Grammy Awards, he was nominated for Best Engineered Album for his work on Brian Wilson Presents Smile (2004). In 2014, Linett appeared as Beach Boys' engineer Chuck Britz in the Brian Wilson biopic Love & Mercy.

To create remixes of the Beach Boys' catalog, Linett uses ProTools as his DAW of choice, although he keeps analog tape machines for the purpose of transferring to digital.
