= The Gay Parade =

Studio album by of Montreal
- Released: February 16, 1999
- Recorded: September 1997 – October 1998
- Genres: Indie pop, baroque pop, psychedelic pop
- Length: 44:35
- Label: Bar/None
- Producer: Kevin Barnes

Of Montreal chronology
The Bedside Drama: A Petite Tragedy (1998)	''The Gay Parade'' (1999)	Horse & Elephant Eatery (No Elephants Allowed): The Singles and Songles Album (2000)

Professional ratings
Review scores
Source	Rating
Allmusic	link
PopMatters	(very favorable) link
Sputnikmusic	(4.5/5) link
Ultimate-Guitar	(10/10) link

The Gay Parade is a 1999 concept album by the band of Montreal and was their third full-length release. Allmusic's reviewer Jason Ankeny designated the album "indie pop's very own Sgt. Pepper". Of Montreal's drummer and bassist Derek Almstead contemporaneously described it as a collection of character studies, comparable to the Kinks' 1968 album The Kinks Are the Village Green Preservation Society.

It has the first album cover designed by lead vocalist Kevin Barnes' brother David, who has since designed the artwork for nearly every subsequent of Montreal album.

== Track listing ==
All tracks are written by Kevin Barnes.

No.	Title	Length
1.	"Old Familiar Way"	2:25
2.	"Fun Loving Nun"	2:17
3.	"Tulip Baroo"	2:10
4.	"Jacques Lamure"	2:31
5.	"The March of the Gay Parade"	2:55
6.	"Neat Little Domestic Life"	2:45
7.	"A Collection of Poems About Water"	3:57
8.	"Y the Quale and Vaguely Bird Noisily Enjoying Their Forbidden Tryst/I'd Be a Yellow Feathered Loon"	2:40
9.	"The Autobiographical Grandpa"	2:19
10.	"The Miniature Philosopher"	1:54
11.	"My Friend Will Be Me"	3:54
12.	"My Favorite Boxer"	3:01
13.	"Advice from a Divorced Gentleman to His Bachelor Friend Considering Marriage"	2:08
14.	"A Man's Life Flashing Before His Eyes While He and His Wife Drive Off a Cliff into the Ocean"	3:04
15.	"Nickee Coco and the Invisible Tree"	5:21
16.	"The Gay Parade Outro"	0:47
Total length:		44:08
