= Yep Roc Records =

American independent record label

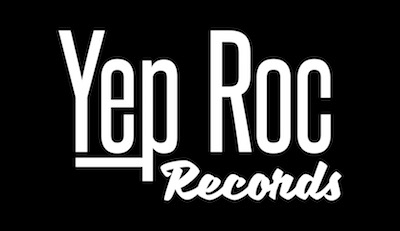
- Founded: 1997
- Founder: Glenn Dicker; Tor Hansen
- Distributor: Redeye Distribution
- Genre: Indie
- Country of origin: U.S.
- Location: Hillsborough, North Carolina
- Official website: yeproc.com

Yep Roc Records is an American independent record label based in Hillsborough, North Carolina, and owned by Redeye Distribution.

== History ==
Tor Hansen started the label in 1997, two years after moving to North Carolina to help manage a chain of record stores in the South. He recruited his friend and former bandmate Glenn Dicker, with whom he had worked at Rounder Records. They made the decision to also start a distribution wing, Redeye.

The first releases were local compilations, followed in subsequent years by records by Hüsker Dü's Bob Mould, Marah, Dolorean, The Legendary Shack Shakers, Cities, Dave Alvin, and Los Straitjackets.

The success of Los Straitjackets and the experience of working with Dicker on the Rounder-distributed Upstart convinced Nick Lowe to join Yep Roc. Scott McCaughey (The Minus 5, Young Fresh Fellows, The Baseball Project, The No Ones) joined the label because of Nick Lowe's presence, and has remained for almost a decade.

== Artists ==
- Alejandro Escovedo
- American Princes
- Amy Farris
- Amy Helm
- Aoife O'Donovan
- BeauSoleil
- Bell X1
- Big Ass Truck
- Big Sandy & His Fly-Rite Boys
- Billy Bragg
- Blitzen Trapper
- Bob Mould
- Born Ruffians (US)
- Caitlin Cary
- Chatham County Line
- Cheyenne Mize
- Chris Stamey
- Chuck Prophet
- Darren Hanlon
- Dave Alvin
- Dolorean
- Doyle Bramhall
- Dressy Bessy
- Drink Up Buttercup
- Elf Power
- Eleni Mandell
- Eli "Paperboy" Reed
- Fountains of Wayne
- Fujiya & Miyagi
- Gang of Four
- Golden Suits
- Grant-Lee Phillips
- Greg Brown
- Heavy Trash
- Heloise and the Savoir Faire
- Ian Hunter
- Ian McLagan
- Ian Moore
- Jeremy & the Harlequins
- Jim Lauderdale
- Jim White
- John Doe
- Jonah Tolchin
- Josh Ritter
- Josh Rouse
- Jukebox the Ghost
- Ken Stringfellow
- Kim Richey
- Kissaway Trail
- Kristin Hersh
- Laika & the Cosmonauts
- Liam Finn (US)
- Look Park
- Los Straitjackets
- Madness (US distribution)
- Mandolin Orange
- Marah
- Mercury Rev
- Michaela Anne
- Nick Lowe (US)
- Paul Weller (US)
- Peggy Sue
- Peter Case
- Radio Birdman
- Reckless Kelly
- Robbie Fulks
- Robyn Hitchcock
- Rock Plaza Central
- Rodney Crowell
- Ron Sexsmith
- Shadowy Men on a Shadowy Planet
- Simple Kid
- Sloan
- Southern Culture on the Skids
- Spencer Dickinson
- Steep Canyon Rangers
- Steve Wynn and the Miracle 3
- Thad Cockrell
- Th' Legendary Shack Shakers
- The Apples in Stereo
- The Autumn Defense
- The Baseball Project
- The Bigger Lovers
- The Butchies
- The Cake Sale
- The Comas
- The Felice Brothers
- The Fleshtones
- The Flesh Eaters
- The Go-Betweens
- The Gourds
- The Iguanas
- The Kingsbury Manx
- The Mayflies USA
- The Minus 5
- The Moaners
- The Old Ceremony
- The Relatives
- The Reverend Horton Heat
- The Rubinoos
- The Sadies
- The Soft Boys
- The Soundtrack of Our Lives
- The Standard
- The Third Mind
- Tift Merritt
- Trailer Bride
- Tres Chicas
- Tony Joe White
- Wesley Stace
- You Am I
- Young Fresh Fellows

== Owners ==
Tor Hansen and Glen Dicker own Yep Roc Records. Glenn Dicker is on The Music Business Association board of directors.

== See also ==
- List of record labels
