= Kindercore Vinyl =

Vinyl record pressing plant

- Industry: Music
- Founded: 1996 (record label); 2017 (pressing plant)
- Defunct: 2023
- Headquarters: 147 Fritz-Mar Lane; Athens, Georgia, United States
- Products: Vinyl Records

Kindercore was an independent record label, and later as Kindercore Vinyl a vinyl record pressing plant based in Athens, Georgia. The label was founded in 1996 by Ryan Lewis and Daniel Geller to help create a unified music scene of Athens. It operated until 2002.

In 2017, Lewis and Geller partnered with Cash Carter and Bill Fortenberry to start a vinyl pressing plant under the old Kindercore brand. During its six years of operation, Kindercore Vinyl was the only vinyl pressing plant in the state of Georgia. It closed down in 2023.

== Record label 1996–2002 ==
Kindercore Records was founded in 1996 by musicians Lewis and Geller in response to the variety of musicians in Athens. Early releases of the label include music by of Montreal and Geller's own band Kincaid, singles by various Athens musicians, and bigger bands such as Japancakes.

Kindercore's scope grew from a regional to national level as their records could be heard on radio stations and their bands networked with other touring bands. In 1998, the label moved to New York and joined with Emperor Norton records, creating better finances and more national exposure for Kindercore. In 2000, Kindercore moved back to Athens, and in 2002 it closed down.

== Vinyl pressing plant 2017–2023 ==
Lewis, Geller, Cash Carter and Bill Fortenberry partnered on founding the plant. After struggling to find financial backing, the group found a local investor interested in their idea to use plant-based PVC for the records. With a $1,000,000 investment, the plant acquired three brand new pressing machines, each costing $200,000, created by Canadian company Viryl Technologies. The presses, named “Warm Tone”, are fully automated, contrasting with former manual pressing machines; Kindercore was among the first factories to use such machines. Kindercore pressed its first record on Halloween of 2017 and presently can press up to 3,000 records in one day. As of 2023, the plant has been sold by Kindercore in a "friendly foreclosure".

== See also ==
- List of record labels
- Music of Athens, Georgia
