= Of Montreal discography =

of Montreal discography
- Studio albums: 20
- Extended plays: 10
- Live albums: 1
- Compilation albums: 9
- Singles: 38

The discography of Athens, Georgia-based indie pop group of Montreal includes twenty full-length albums, ten extended plays, nine compilation albums, and thirty-eight singles.

== Studio albums ==
Title	Album details	Peak chart positions					
Title	Album details	US	US Alt.	US Indie	US Rock	FRA	UK Indie
Cherry Peel	Released: July 15, 1997; Label: Bar/None; Format: CD; Released on vinyl by Devil In The Woods in 2004.	—	—	—	—	—	—
The Bedside Drama: A Petite Tragedy	Released: January 1, 1998; Label: Kindercore; Format: CD, Vinyl (1999)	—	—	—	—	—	—
The Gay Parade	Released: February 16, 1999; Label: Bar/None, Kindercore; Format: CD (Bar/None), vinyl (Kindercore)	—	—	—	—	—	—
Coquelicot Asleep in the Poppies: A Variety of Whimsical Verse	Released: April 23, 2001; Label: Kindercore; Format: CD, vinyl; Reissued on CD by Polyvinyl in 2004.	—	—	—	—	—	—
Aldhils Arboretum	Released: September 10, 2002; Label: Kindercore; Format: CD, vinyl; Reissued on CD by Polyvinyl in 2004.	—	—	—	—	—	—
Satanic Panic in the Attic	Released: April 6, 2004; Label: Polyvinyl; Format: CD, vinyl	—	—	—	—	—	—
The Sunlandic Twins	Released: April 12, 2005; Label: Polyvinyl; Format: CD, vinyl	—	—	—	—	—	—
Hissing Fauna, Are You the Destroyer?	Released: January 23, 2007; Label: Polyvinyl; Format: CD, vinyl	72	—	2	24	—	—
Skeletal Lamping	Released: October 21, 2008; Label: Polyvinyl; Format: CD, vinyl	38	10	3	14	120	36
False Priest	Released: September 14, 2010; Label: Polyvinyl; Format: CD, vinyl	34	11	6	14	196	—
Paralytic Stalks	Released: February 7, 2012; Label: Polyvinyl; Format: Cassette, CD, MP3, vinyl	121	18	17	29	—	—
Lousy with Sylvianbriar	Released: October 8, 2013; Label: Polyvinyl; Format: Cassette, CD, MP3, vinyl	115	—	21	40	—	—
Aureate Gloom	Released: March 3, 2015; Label: Polyvinyl; Format: Cassette, CD, MP3, vinyl	— (Note: Aureate Gloom did not enter the US Billboard 200, but peaked at number 88 on the Top Current Albums Chart.)	16	17	23	—	—
Innocence Reaches	Released: August 12, 2016; Label: Polyvinyl; Format: Cassette, CD, vinyl	— (Note: Innocence Reaches did not enter the US Billboard 200, but peaked at number 94 on the Top Album Sales Chart.)	19	14	20	—	—
White Is Relic/Irrealis Mood	Released: March 9, 2018; Label: Polyvinyl; Format: Cassette, CD, vinyl	— (Note: White Is Relic/Irrealis Mood did not enter the US Billboard 200, but peaked at number 79 on the Top Current Albums Chart.)	— (Note: "White Is Relic/Irrealis Mood" did not enter the Alternative Albums chart, but peaked at number nine on the Alternative Album Sales chart.)	18	— (Note: "White Is Relic/Irrealis Mood" did not enter the Top Rock Albums chart, but peaked at number 25 on the Rock Album Sales chart.)	—	—
Ur Fun	Released: January 17, 2020; Label: Polyvinyl; Format: Cassette, CD, vinyl	— (Note: Ur Fun did not enter the US Billboard 200, but peaked at number 77 on the Album Sales Chart.)	—	—	—	—	—
I Feel Safe with You, Trash	Released: March 5, 2021; Label: Sybaritic Peer; Format: Digital	—	—	—	—	—	—
Freewave Lucifer F<ck F^ck F>ck	Released: July 29, 2022; Label: Polyvinyl; Format: Cassette, CD, vinyl, digital	—	—	—	—	—	—
Lady on the Cusp	Released: May 17, 2024; Label: Polyvinyl; Format: CD, vinyl, digital	—	—	—	—	—	—
Aethermead	Released: June 5, 2026; Label: Polyvinyl; Format: CD, vinyl, digital	—	—	—	—	—	—
"—" denotes a release that did not chart.

== Live albums ==
Title	Album details
Snare Lustrous Doomings	Released: April 18, 2015; Released: Polyvinyl; Format: yellow & orange double LP vinyl

== Compilation albums ==
Title	Album details	US Vinyl
Horse & Elephant Eatery (No Elephants Allowed): The Singles and Songles Album	Released: April 25, 2000; Label: Bar/None, Kindercore	—
The Early Four Track Recordings	Released: January 16, 2001; Label: Kindercore; Format: CD; Released on vinyl by Polyvinyl in 2009.	—
An Introduction to Of Montreal	Released: 2001; Label: Earworm; Format: Vinyl	—
If He Is Protecting Our Nation, Then Who Will Protect Big Oil, Our Children?	Released: July 1, 2003; Label: self-released; Format: CD; Reissued by Track & Field in 2003 and Polyvinyl in 2007	—
The Gladiator Nightstick Collection	Released: October 12, 2004; Label: Devil In The Woods; Format: Vinyl	—
Satanic Twins	Released: August 26, 2006; Label: Polyvinyl; Format: CD, vinyl	—
Ambivalent Stumbling Hysterical Dispatches, Strictly In Unisex	Released: September 10, 2010; Label: Polyvinyl; Format: Digital (iTunes exclusive)	—
Daughter of Cloud	Released: October 23, 2012; Label: Polyvinyl; Format: CD, Digital, vinyl	9
Young Froth/Taypiss	Released: April 29, 2013; Label: Self-released; Format: Vinyl	—

== Extended plays ==
Title	EP details	US Vinyl
The Bird Who Ate the Rabbit's Flower	Released: 1997; Label: Kindercore; Format: CD	—
The Bird Who Continues to Eat the Rabbit's Flower	Released: January 1, 1997; Label: Kindercore; Format: CD; Reissued on vinyl in 2009 by Polyvinyl.	—
Covers EP	Released: 2004; Label: Polyvinyl; Format: CD	—
Deflated Chime, Foals Slightly Flower Sibylline Responses	Released: January 19, 2006; Label: Polyvinyl; Format: CD	—
7 Song Sampler	Released: June 30, 2006; Label: Polyvinyl; Format: CD	—
Icons, Abstract Thee	Released: May 8, 2007; Label: Polyvinyl; Format: CD	—
Sony Connect Set	Released: 2007; Label: Sony Connect, Polyvinyl; Format: CD	—
An Eluardian Instance (Jon Brion Remix)	Released: January 27, 2009; Label: Polyvinyl; Format: CD	—
thecontrollersphere	Released: April 26, 2011; Label: Polyvinyl; Format: CD	4
Rune Husk	Released: January 13, 2017; Label: Self-released; Format: Digital	—

== Singles ==
Year	Title	Released by	Album
1998	"Nicki Lighthouse"	100 Guitar Mania	Cherry Peel
1999	"Singles Club #3"	Happy Happy Birthday To Me Records	non-album single
1999	"The Problem With April"	Kindercore	non-album single
1999	"Spoon Full of Sugar" (Note: Cover of a track originally recorded by The Gants.)	Kindercore	non-album single
1999	"True Friends Don't Want To Do Things Like That"	Kindercore	non-album single
2000	"Archibald of the Balding Sparrows" (Note: Split with Marshmellow Coast)	Kindercore	non-album single
2001	"Kindercore Single of the Month" (Note: Split with Ladybug Transistor)	Kindercore	non-album single
2001	"Jonathan Whiskey Split" (Note: Split with The Late B.P. Helium)	Jonathan Whiskey	non-album single
2003	"Jennifer Louise"	Track & Field	Aldhils Arboretum
2004	"I Was a Landscape in Your Dream"	Harvest Time Recordings	The Sunlandic Twins
2006	"Microuniversity"	Park the Van	non-album single
2006	"Voltaic Crusher"	Suicide Squeeze	non-album single
2006	"She's a Rejector" (CD)	Polyvinyl	Hissing Fauna, Are You the Destroyer?
2007	"She's a Rejector" (vinyl)	Polyvinyl	Hissing Fauna, Are You the Destroyer?
2007	"Faberge Falls for Shuggie DJ Edition"	Polyvinyl	Hissing Fauna, Are You the Destroyer?
2007	"Heimdalsgate Like a Promethean Curse"	Polyvinyl	Hissing Fauna, Are You the Destroyer?
2007	"Suffer for Fashion"	Polyvinyl	Hissing Fauna, Are You the Destroyer?
2007	"Gender Mutiny Tour"	Polyvinyl	non-album single
2008	"Everything About Her is Wrong" "The Pimps are Simpering"	Polyvinyl	non-album single
2008	"Id Engager"	Polyvinyl	Skeletal Lamping
2008	"Id Engager – Mad Decent Remixes"	Mad Decent	Skeletal Lamping
2008	"Jimmy" "Middle Class Ghetto"	Hearfast	non-album single
2009	"For Our Elegant Caste"	Polyvinyl	Skeletal Lamping
2009	"An Eluardian Instance"	Polyvinyl	Skeletal Lamping
2010	"Coquet Coquette"	Polyvinyl	False Priest
2010	"Singles Club #11" (Note: Split with James Husband.)	Happy Happy Birthday To Me Records	non-album single
2011	"Expecting to Fly" (Note: Split with Casiokids)	Polyvinyl	non-album single
2013	"Fugitive Air"	Polyvinyl	Lousy with Sylvianbriar
2014	"Bassem Sabry"	Polyvinyl	Aureate Gloom
2015	"Chinese Rocks" / "Either Way I Lose"	Polyvinyl	non-album single
2016	"It's Different For Girls"	Polyvinyl	Innocence Reaches
2016	"My Fair Lady"	Polyvinyl	Innocence Reaches
2018	"Paranoiac Intervals/Body Dysmorphia"	Polyvinyl	White Is Relic/Irrealis Mood
2018	"Plateau Phase/No Careerism No Corruption"	Polyvinyl	White Is Relic/Irrealis Mood
2019	"Polyaneurism"	Polyvinyl	UR FUN
2022	"Marajuana's a Working Woman"	Polyvinyl	Freewave Lucifer f<ck f^ck f>ck
2022	"Blab Sabbath Lathe of Maiden"	Polyvinyl	Freewave Lucifer f<ck f^ck f>ck
2026	"When"	Polyvinyl	aethermead
2026	"Already Dreaming"	Polyvinyl	aethermead
2026	"Take the Form"	Polyvinyl	aethermead

== Other appearances ==
=== On soundtracks ===
Year	Song	Album	Released by
2005	"Requiem for O.M.M."	Music from The O.C.: Mix 5	Warner Brothers
2006	"Wraith Pinned to the Mist and Other Games"	Weeds: Music from the Original Series, Volume 2	Lion's Gate
2006	"Wraith Pinned to the Mist and Other Games"	Rob's Party Mix (soundtrack to Cloverfield)	n/a

=== In record label collections ===
==== Kindercore ====
Year	Song	Album
1997	"My Favorite Christmas (In A Hundred Words Or Less)"	Christmas In Stereo
1999	"Christmas Isn't Safe For Animals"	Christmas Two
2000	"An Ill-Treated Hiccup's View Of The World"	Kindercore Fifty - We Thank You
2000	"You Are An Airplane (World Trade Remix)"	Kindercore Fifty - We Thank You

==== Happy Happy Birthday To Me ====
Year	Song	Album
1999	"Hello From Inside A Shell (Demo)"	Happy Happy Birthday To Me Volume 1
2006	"Celebration Of H. Hare"	Singles Club 1999-2000
2009	"Wet Butcher's Fist"	Singles Club Special Bag
2009	"The Self-Centered Stepmother…" (Note: The full title of this song is "The Self-Centered Stepmother Forces Her Husband To Tell His Son To Stop Working With Power Tools In The Basement")	Singles Club Special Bag
2009	"Hitler, Being Punished For Obvious Reasons…" (Note: The full title of this song is "Hitler, Being Punished For Obvious Reasons, Is Forced To Spend Eternity Plagued By An Intense Unrelenting Physical And Emotional Fatigue That Is Further Compounded By An Innumerable Multitude Of Obnoxious Grandchildren Who Are Constantly Present And Who Irritate Him To Such An Extreme That Not The Slightest Degree Of Rest Is Attainable".)	Singles Club Special Bag

==== Polyvinyl ====
Year	Song	Album
2004	"Disconnect the Dots"	Polyvinyl 2004 Sampler
2005	"So Begins Our Alabee"	Polyvinyl 2005
2005	"Wraith Pinned To The Mist And Other Games"	Polyvinyl Summer/Fall 2005
2006	"Psychotic Feeling"	What To Do With Everything
2007	"Gronlandic Edit"	Before You Go: 2008 Polyvinyl Sampler
2008	"An Eluardian Instance"	Polyvinyl 2009 Sampler

=== In magazine collections ===
- 1999 CMJ New Music Volume 66 February 1999
- 2005 SPEX CD #52
- 2006 Paste Magazine Sampler Issue 23
- 2007 All Areas Volume 80
- 2007 Paste Magazine Sampler Issue 28
- 2007 SPEX CD #7
- 2007 Sounds - Now!
- 2007 Wake Up! 15-track Guide To New North American Indie
- 2007 ¬ 11
- 2008 Paste Magazine Sampler Issue 48
- 2008 Sounds - Now!
- 2008 Untitled (Spex Magazine)
- 2009 Rare Trax Vol. 62 - New Psychedelic Classics: The Eclectic Kool Aid Sound Spectacle

=== In other compilations ===
- 1999 Second Thoughts
- 1999 The Gants Never Again! - Tribute To The Gants
- 2000 Rabid Chords 002 VU Tribute
- 2000 Songs For A Crimson Eggtree
- 2000 U.S. Pop Life Vol. 5 ~ Athens/ The Invention To Be Nobody & Nowhere
- 2001 Homesleep Home²: Cover Songs
- 2001 The Winter Report; A Hype City Compilation
- 2002 New Adventures In Lo-Fi Bonus CD
- 2003 Comes With A Smile Vol. 8 - Like Others Need Oxygen
- 2004 POW! To The People
- 2004 Untitled (Ghetto Kitty Island)
- 2005 Dockdelux
- 2005 Vice CD/DVD #2 Presented By Sony Connect - Volume 12 Number 2
- 2007 Bad News Records Special Sampler '07
- 2007 Best Of 2007
- 2007 For The Kids Three!
- 2007 Iceland Airwaves '07!
- 2007 Optimus Blitz Aprova Os Melhores De 2007
- 2007 Reprises Inrocks
- 2007 Scraps
- 2007 Slottsfjell Festival 2007
- 2007 This Is Next - Indie's Biggest Hits Volume 1
- 2007 We Deliver The Goods
- 2008 D Is For Disco, E Is For Dancing
- 2008 Give Listen Help
- 2008 KUT Live Vol. 4
- 2008 Rough Trade Shops - Counter Culture 07
- 2008 The Green Owl Compilation: A Benefit For The Energy Action Coalition
- 2008 The Who Covered
- 2008 Tsugi Sampler 013
- 2008 Une Rentrée 2008 - Vol. 3
- 2008 We Love U! (The Hi-Lo Tunez Plan: 10th Step)
- 2009 Los Angeles Live Volume Six
