= The Past Is a Grotesque Animal =

The Past is a Grotesque Animal
- DVD cover
- Directed by: Jason Miller
- Produced by: Jason Miller; Andrew Napier
- Starring: Kevin Barnes
- Edited by: Jason Miller; Andrew Napier
- Music by: of Montreal
- Distributed by: Oscilloscope Laboratories
- Release date: June 16, 2014
- Running time: 79 minutes
- Country: United States

The Past is a Grotesque Animal is a 2014 documentary centered around the indie pop band of Montreal. It was directed by Jason Miller and features appearances by most former and current members of the band. It released to mostly positive reviews. The title of the film is taken from the seventh track off of the band's album Hissing Fauna, Are You the Destroyer?.

== Summary ==
The film concentrates on frontman Kevin Barnes through his career starting from his childhood where he found his love of music and up until the 2013 release of the of Montreal album Lousy with Sylvianbriar.

The film interviews many figures in Barnes' life, including his parents and former bandmates, and Barnes himself. The film also focuses on the impact Barnes has had on these figures as he furthered his music career.

== Production ==
Footage for the documentary began recording by filmmaker Jason Miller in 2007 to document a concert from the band. Recording continued on and off stage until 2012. Alongside the footage, a box of old tapes documenting the band from its earliest days resurfaced, thus giving Miller the opportunity to create the documentary.

== Release ==
The film was crowdfunded via Kickstarter under the original title Song Dynasties. It raised $100,000 to fund the film's production.

The film premiered on June 16, 2014, in select theatres across the United States via Oscilloscope Laboratories. The film was later released on digital platforms and had a DVD release in August.

== Appearances ==
=== of Montreal members ===
- Dottie Alexander
- Derek Almstead
- Kevin Barnes
- Davey Pierce
- Rebecca Cash
- Bryan Poole
- James Huggins
- Jojo Glidewell
- Clayton Rychlik
- Nina Grøttland (credited as Nina Barnes)

=== Other appearances ===
- Solange Knowles
- David Barnes
- Janelle Monae
- Susan Sarandon
- Andrew VanWyngarden
- Jon Brion
- Ariel Pink

== Reception ==
According to film aggregator Rotten Tomatoes, the film holds a positive rating at 71% in audience reviews.

PopMatters praises the film's narrative and exhibition of the band's artistic evolution, but notes the film is "too short" for the band's history and claims the film "zips far too quickly" through it. The film was rated by them a 7/10.
