= Great Lakes (band) =

American rock band

Great Lakes is an American rock and roll band formed in Athens, Georgia, United States, in 1996. The band was formed by Ben Crum, Jamey Huggins, & Dan Donahue. Great Lakes were among the second wave of bands included in The Elephant Six Collective.

== History ==
The debut self titled album Great Lakes was recorded 1996–1999 on Crum's 1/2" 8-track tape machine in their home studio in Athens, Georgia. It was released in 2000 on Kindercore/Elephant 6. The group consisted of founders Ben Crum, Dan Donahue, & James Huggins III, with a bevvy of supporting players from the Athens/E6 music scene. After relocating to Athens, GA from Birmingham, Alabama, the trio met like minded musicians in fellow Athens bands like Elf Power, Olivia Tremor Control, Neutral Milk Hotel, and of Montreal. Great Lakes grew from a three piece recording project to a full-blown rotating ‘mini- orchestra’ featuring over 12 musicians for the recording sessions & live tours for the first two albums. By the third release Donahue and Crum had moved to New York, and the band entered a new phase. By 2008, Crum was solely at the helm, and had assembled a Brooklyn-based lineup of the band that would continue playing together for over a decade. Crum discusses this shift in an interview with Dagger Zine:

"I’ve been the only original member of the band for over 10 years now. But it was really only for the first 2 records that the original members were a big part of the band, anyway, to be honest. And even then it was really just the first one that was the product of genuine collaboration. Back then it was me and Dan writing songs together, but by the time the first record came out we'd put together a big band that also featured Kevin Barnes from of Montreal, Scott Spillane from Neutral Milk Hotel/Olivia Tremor Control, Bryan Poole from Elf Power, and Derek Almstead, Dottie Alexander, Heather McIntosh, and Jamey Huggins as a multi-instrumentalist and our main drummer. Jamey and I really collaborated very closely on the first record, in terms of working out the instrumentation on the songs. That was a really good, positive collaboration. And, truthfully, it hurt me when he chose to pretty much leave the band and focus on of Montreal. But I understood his decision. They were getting really popular, and I couldn't blame him. Then, in 2002, I moved to Brooklyn and Dan followed not long after, and once we'd both left Athens that was basically the end of the original lineup. Dan and I kept writing songs together, though, with him writing the lyrics and me writing the music. We went back to Athens to record Diamond Times, and a bunch of the old crew pitched in and played on the record... The thing about bands continuing on without original members is tricky. A lot of times those bands aren't very good without the original lineup. But I always think about The Byrds when this subject comes up. My favorite Byrds records are the ones Roger McGuinn made without Gene Clark and David Crosby. I mean, I love the Gene Clark solo stuff, and that first David Crosby solo record, too. And of course the early Byrds stuff is great. But those late Byrds records are the ones I like the most. I like to think of Great Lakes like that. Maybe some people prefer the early stuff, and that's fine. But I'm just going to keep on doing my own thing, regardless of what anybody else thinks."

The other two founding members have released music through their other songwriting outlets, Dream Boat & James Husband respectively. James released the album A Parallax I and continues to work on J.Husband and Donahue has contributed lyrics to several other bands' albums, including Of Montreal's City Bird, Elf Power's The Taking Under, and Bear In Heaven's Space Remains. Donahue has designed art, album covers, and videos for the bands MGMT, Pavement, Belle and Sebastian, and R.E.M.

=== Formation ===
The group started as a songwriting partnership between Dan Donahue and Ben Crum with James Huggins III joining band when it officially formed in 1996. The original lineup also included bassist/vocalist Craig Ceravolo and performed and recorded demos in Birmingham, Alabama, under the name ‘Cherry Valence’. For a time the band was also called ‘Wheelie Ride’, before it changed officially to ‘Great Lakes’.

=== 2000 – 2008 ===
Great Lakes released a self-titled debut album in 2000 on the label Kindercore Records. The album was produced and mostly mixed by Crum and Huggins, with final mixing by Robert Schneider of The Apples in Stereo. The LP package included a psychedelic 3-D cut-out mobile meant to sit atop the vinyl record and spin as it is played, designed by Donahue with technical help from long time R.E.M. designer Chris Bilheimer. The final track on the self-titled debut, "Virgil," (penned by Huggins, though owing a heavy debt to The Kinks' "Picture Book") was included on a CMJ music magazine sampler CD in 2000.

After releasing a number of 7” singles the band released their second album, The Distance Between, on the Athens, GA label Orange Twin in 2002. Their sophomore release was written by Crum and Donahue. It was again recorded and mixed in the band's home studio in Athens. It was selected as one of the top ten overlooked albums of that year by Magnet Magazine, which noted the band's ability to "spew out a fuzz-laced garage assault" and complimented their "knack for fusing melancholy with feats of ballroom levitation". The band did a tour in Europe, including stops in Scandinavia and the UK. A highlight stateside found them supporting Belle & Sebastian at the Tabernacle in Atlanta. During that year, both Crum and Donahue relocated to Brooklyn and continued writing, while Huggins toured with the band Of Montreal. He remained a recording and arranging contributor to Great Lakes for the third album, but no longer performed live with the band.

The third Great Lakes album, Diamond Times, was begun in Athens and completed in New York. These sessions amounted to a turning point for the band, as Crum assumed greater control. Donahue and Crum fell out creatively soon after. ‘Diamond Times’ was released by Empyrean Records. 'Diamond Times’ is the last recording to feature many of the original performers, including Huggins, Poole, Alexander, and Barnes (though Andrew Rieger and Heather McIntosh contributed to the band's later albums). After the release of Diamond Times, Crum assembled a three-piece lineup to tour behind it. This lineup included Kyle Forester on bass and backing vocals and Kevin Shea on drums. This lineup toured the US with The Clientele in 2005, and toured Europe multiple times in 2005 and 2006 with Ladybug Transistor and others.

=== 2008 – present ===
Since 2008, the band has released six more albums. Ways of Escape came out in 2010 was the first release to feature Crum as sole songwriter. Crum discusses the story of the album in a lengthy piece written for Aquarium Drunkard. Ways of Escape is notable for the introduction of vocalist Suzanne Nienaber, and features, among others, Kevin Shea of Storm & Stress on drums, Joe McGinty on keyboards, David Lerner of Ted Leo and the Pharmacists on bass, and long-time Great Lakes contributor Heather McIntosh on cello.

In 2011, Crum reconvened the group of musicians who played on Ways of Escape to begin a new album, Wild Vision, which was released January 22, 2016 on Crum's own Loose Trucks label. The Vinyl District wrote that Wild Vision "delivers a creative peak for Crum and Great Lakes," and noted "The Great Lakes of the 21st century registers as a near completely different proposition from the one that existed during 2000 to 2002. Diamond Times links the promising yet ultimately minor early work to the considerable achievements of the last two LPs. The confident and appealing Wild Vision serves as the pinnacle of this unforeseeable but welcome circumstance."

On April 6, 2018, Ben and his Great Lakes bandmates would return with Dreaming Too Close to the Edge. Again, the album features Crum with Nienaber, Shea, McGinty, and Kenny Wachtel, and includes guest spots from Andrew Rieger and Luis Leal. Magnet called the album "one of the band's best" and praised Crum's "lyrical prowess and subtle way with melody." Brightest Young Things called the song "Time Served" from the album "gorgeous and deceiving" and Backseat Mafia described the song "End of An Error" as "classic noisy indie rock". Long-running music site Babysue said of Dreaming Too Close: "These ten originals show why fans continue to follow and support Great Lakes. Crum writes songs delivered with unique sincerity."

On February 4, 2022, the band would release Contenders, featuring Crum with Shea and Nienaber once again, the Essex Green's Chris Ziter, Little Red Rocket's Louis Schefano, and Ray Rizzo, a sideman of Glen Hansard and Josh Ritter. New Noise gave the album a 7/10, describing it as "one of their best yet" and praising its rootsy elements. Spill would give it a 9/10, praising the album's use of sonic sensibilities reminiscent of the 1960s and 70s.

On November 7, 2025, the band would release their eighth studio album, Don't Swim too Close, featuring a variety of musicians including Gould, Nienaber, Shea, Forester, new additions of James Richardson, and Sam Cohen, along with a posthumous San Fadyl's old drum tracks appearing on "San's Blues" and "Ohm" accompanying Crum. Crum, who had played in and formed a connection with Fadyl through an incarnation of the Ladybug Transistor, would explain "it was a pleasure, in a way, to get to play with San again—from beyond the grave." It's Psychedelic Baby magazine would describe the album as a "darkly compelling listen", calling Crum "a songwriter who can turn the future into an open grave and still make you laugh".

The band's next LP, "Fear of the Fear", would release under HHBTM Records in August of 2026. Crum describes the album as a personal collection of songs mostly focusing on the death of his close friend, Ryan Trammel. The album features Shea, Nienaber, Gould, Forester, along with Steve Silverstein, Petter Folkedal, Leah Keys, Andrew Geraci, Seth Moody, and John Whittemoore. The album was recorded in Memphis, with many of the musicians who play on it being residents of the area.

== Discography ==
=== Albums ===
- Great Lakes (CD/LP) - Kindercore/Track & Field Organisation - 2000
- The Distance Between (CD/LP) - Orange Twin/Track & Field Organisation - 2002
- Diamond Times (CD/LP) - Empyrean/Track & Field Organisation - 2006
- Ways of Escape (CD) - Orange Twin - 2010
- Wild Vision (CD/LP) - Loose Trucks Records - 2016
- Dreaming Too Close to the Edge (CD) - Loose Trucks Records - 2018
- Contenders (LP) - HHBTM Records - 2022
- Don't Swim Too Close (LP) - HHBTM Records - 2025
- Fear of the Fear (LP) - HHBTM Records - 2026

=== Singles and EPs ===
- "Happy Happy Birthday to Me singles club: March" (7") - HHBTM Records - 1999
- "Kindercore singles club: May" (split single with Elf Power) (7") - Kindercore - 2000
- "Come Storming" (CD) - La Suprette - 2001
- "Sister City" (7") - Hype City - 2001
- "A Little Touched" (7") - Track & Field Organisation - 2002
