= Freewave Lucifer F-ck F-ck F-ck =

Freewave Lucifer F<ck F^ck F>ck

Studio album by of Montreal
- Released: July 29, 2022
- Genre: Progressive pop • art pop • electropop • neo-psychedelia
- Length: 33:53
- Label: Polyvinyl
- Producer: Kevin Barnes

Of Montreal chronology
I Feel Safe with You, Trash (2021)	Freewave Lucifer F<ck F^ck F>ck (2022)	Lady on the Cusp (2024)

Freewave Lucifer F<ck F^ck F>ck is the eighteenth studio album by American indie rock band of Montreal, released on July 29, 2022, through Polyvinyl Record Co. It received generally positive reviews from critics.

== Background ==
The sense of isolation caused by the COVID-19 pandemic was an inspiration for the record, which takes a cut-up technique approach to its lyrics and titles.

== Critical reception ==
Professional ratings
Aggregate scores
Source	Rating
Metacritic	68/100
Review scores
Source	Rating
AllMusic	3.5/5 stars
Pitchfork	6.8/10
PopMatters	5/10
Under the Radar	7/10 stars

Freewave Lucifer F<ck F^ck F>ck received a score of 68 out of 100 on review aggregator Metacritic based on five critics' reviews, indicating "generally favorable" reception. Reviewing the album for Pitchfork, Jude Noel described it as "another snapshot of the band in a state of manic deconstruction, retooling 2020's hooky, '80s-inspired Ur Fun into a labyrinthine dance-rock collage" as well as "unabashedly geeky, restless, and stuffed with enough Barnesian minutiae to satisfy even the most dedicated fan". Marcy Donelson of AllMusic remarked that the album "organizes its patchwork segments into a more digestible seven tracks, even if they do play out like a continuous DJ mix somewhere around the midway point", also calling it "a shape-shifting and ultimately surprisingly (if not entirely) listenable and cathartic sequence of tracks".

Scott Dransfield of Under the Radar wrote, "imagine, if you will, a newly consistent cannabis high, crossed with pandemic paranoia, with a dash of overindulgent avant-garde art consumption and the ADHD spectrum, and you might get close to the mindset that produced Freewave Lucifer F<ck F^ck F>ck". Ryan Dillon of Glide Magazine summed the album up as a "7-track expedition that has the Georgia-bred artist experimenting with dark tones and new textures". PopMatters' Chris Conaton found it to be "not the sort of record that is going to appeal to a wide audience. Even among Of Montreal fans, it's likely listeners who enjoyed the esoteric experimentation of albums like Paralytic Stalks and White Is Relic/Irrealis Mood will be fully into this one".

== Track listing ==
Freewave Lucifer F<ck F^ck F>ck track listing
No.	Title	Length
1.	"Marijuana's a Working Woman"	5:27
2.	"Ofrenda-Flanger-Ego-à Gogo"	3:21
3.	"Blab Sabbath Lathe of Maiden"	5:48
4.	"Après Thee Dèclassè"	5:19
5.	"Modern Art Bewilders"	4:04
6.	"Nightsift"	4:40
7.	"Hmmm"	5:14
Total length:		33:53
