= Amok =

Amok may refer to:

- Running amok, the act of behaving disruptively or uncontrollably.

== Film ==
- Amok (1934 film), a French film
- Amok (1944 film), a Mexican romantic drama
- Amok (1983 film), a Moroccan drama

== Literature ==
- Amok (comics), an Italian comic book series
- Amok (novella), by Stefan Zweig, 1922
- Amok, a 1974 novel by Harry Thürk
- Amok, a 2003 novel by Krystian Bala

== Music ==
- Amok (The Late B.P. Helium album), 2004
- Amok (Sentenced album), 1995
- Amok (Atoms for Peace album), 2013

== Other uses ==
- Amok (dish), a Khmer name for Southeast Asian type of curry steam-cooked in banana leaves
  - Fish amok, a Cambodian steamed fish curry
- Amok (video game), a 1996 video game for the Sega Saturn
- Mok language, also known as Amok
- Amok (publisher), now Frémok, a Franco-Belgian comics publishing house
- Amok Press, a defunct American book publisher

== See also ==
- "Amok Time", a 1967 episode of Star Trek: The Original Series
- Amuck!, a 1972 Italian giallo film
- AMOC (disambiguation)
