= I Feel Safe with You, Trash =

I Feel Safe With You, Trash

Studio album by Of Montreal
- Released: March 5, 2021
- Recorded: March - November 2020
- Studios: Sunlandic (Athens, Georgia)
- Genres: Neo-psychedelia, art pop, progressive pop, Psychedelic Pop
- Length: 66:02
- Label: Sybaritic Peer
- Producer: Kevin Barnes

Of Montreal chronology
| Ur Fun (2020) | I Feel Safe With You, Trash (2021) | Freewave Lucifer F-ck F-ck F-ck (2022) |

I Feel Safe with You, Trash is the seventeenth studio album by American indie rock band Of Montreal. It was self-released on March 5, 2021, through Sybaritic Peer. It was re-released through Polyvinyl Record Co., on November 21, 2024.

== Track listing ==
All tracks are written by Kevin Barnes.

| No. | Title | Length |
|---|---|---|
| 1. | "Carton Aesthesis (o portão)" | 1:59 |
| 2. | "And We Can Survive Anything If We Fake It" | 2:54 |
| 3. | "Aries Equals GoOd Trash" | 4:19 |
| 4. | "Queer As Love" | 2:40 |
| 5. | "Now That's What I Call Freewave" | 2:43 |
| 6. | "JaPanese Word For Witch" | 3:06 |
| 7. | "This Is ExpOsed" | 2:57 |
| 8. | "True Beauty ForeveR" | 3:48 |
| 9. | "Fuckheads Is The AuTo-Correction" | 4:24 |
| 10. | "Drowner's TeÃrs" | 2:50 |
| 11. | "I Feel Safe With You, Trash" | 3:20 |
| 12. | "Fingerless GlOves" | 3:02 |
| 13. | "Notes Of ViOlate SPectates A Flatter Of Male" | 3:26 |
| 14. | "EquatOrial Hemorrhage Is A Dead Link" | 3:36 |
| 15. | "Yamagata FoRest Flutes" | 1:50 |
| 16. | "ExtracT The Masculine Germ From Remote Memory'" | 3:25 |
| 17. | "ThRam Rammaged Ã Man-mod" | 2:49 |
| 18. | "Kcrraannggaanngg!!" | 4:02 |
| 19. | "Karlheinz ChOp Up Children" | 3:49 |
| 20. | "So Chill Then (o Portão)" | 5:02 |
| Total length: | | 1:06:02 |

== Personnel ==
- Kevin Barnes – vocals, all instruments, production, mixing, engineering
- Mike Nolte – mastering
- David Barnes – artwork
- Owen Barnes – artwork
- Christina Schneider – art layout, designer
