= Thecontrollersphere =

thecontrollersphere

EP by of Montreal
- Released: March 4, 2011 (digital); April 26, 2011 (physical)
- Recorded: Apollinaire Rave studio (Athens, Georgia); Ocean Way Recording (Los Angeles, California)
- Genre: Psychedelic pop
- Length: 23:54
- Label: Polyvinyl
- Producer: Kevin Barnes, Jon Brion

Of Montreal chronology
False Priest (2010)	thecontrollersphere (2011)	Paralytic Stalks (2012)

thecontrollersphere is the fifth EP from indie pop band of Montreal. It was made available for pre-order and instant download from Polyvinyl on March 4, 2011 and was officially released on April 26, 2011. The EP consists of tracks recorded along with the album False Priest.

Professional ratings
Aggregate scores
Source	Rating
Metacritic	60/100
Review scores
Source	Rating
Allmusic	2.5/5 stars
Beats per Minute	52%
Consequence of Sound	3/5 stars
Drowned in Sound	6/10
Pitchfork Media	6.6/10
Rolling Stone	3/5 stars
Slant Magazine	3.5/5 stars

== Track listing ==
1. "Black Lion Massacre" – 5:08
2. "Flunkt Sass vs the Root Plume" – 2:38
3. "Holiday Call" – 8:18
4. "L'age D'or" – 3:32
5. "Slave Translator" – 4:13
