= Dottie Alexander =

Dorothy Alexander
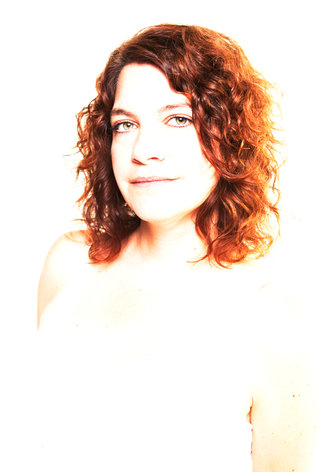
- Dottie Alexander (September 2010)

Background information
- Born: March 22, 1972 (age 53)
- Origin: New England, US
- Genres: Indie pop, Indie rock, Psychedelic pop, electronic, experimental
- Occupation: Musician
- Instruments: Guitar, piano, keyboards
- Labels: Polyvinyl, Kindercore, Bar/None
- Formerly of: of Montreal, My First Keyboard

Dorothy "Dottie" Alexander is the former keyboardist for of Montreal, an American indie pop band formed in Athens, Georgia and fronted by Kevin Barnes.

== Biography ==
Dottie received her bachelor's degree at the University of Georgia at Athens. Prior to moving to Athens, Dottie graduated from Westover Senior High School in Fayetteville, North Carolina in 1990.

On July 26, 2009, long-time boyfriend and of Montreal video editor and stage performer Nick Gould proposed during an of Montreal show at the Hollywood Bowl. The wedding took place in May 2010.

== Projects ==
Prior to joining of Montreal, Dottie was in a local Athens, Georgia band with James Huggins III called Lightning Bug vs. Firefly. Both Dottie and James joined of Montreal in 1998. Besides being a steady member of of Montreal, she also played in Elephant 6 stalwarts Great Lakes.

In 1997, Dottie contributed to Kindercore's first Christmas in Stereo album under the My First Keyboard moniker. Three songs were recorded in the late nineties, and one of them would eventually be released on Montreal's compilation "Horse & Elephant Eatery (No Elephants Allowed)".

In October 2009, Dottie toured with James Husband in support of his first official release, "A Parallax I".
