= Hissing Fauna, Are You the Destroyer? =

2007 studio album by of Montreal

Studio album by of Montreal
- Released: January 7, 2007
- Recorded: January 2005 – March 2006
- Genre: Indie pop; glam rock; art pop; experimental pop; neo-psychedelia
- Length: 51:22 (CD); 68:32 (LP)
- Label: Polyvinyl
- Producer: Kevin Barnes

Of Montreal chronology
Satanic Twins (2006)	Hissing Fauna, Are You the Destroyer? (2007)	Icons, Abstract Thee (2007)

Singles from Hissing Fauna, Are You the Destroyer?
- 1. "Faberge Falls for Shuggie" Released: December 5, 2006; 2. "She's a Rejecter" Released: December 5, 2006; 3. "Heimdalsgate Like a Promethean Curse" Released: January 23, 2007; 4. "Suffer for Fashion" Released: July 17, 2007; 5. "The Past Is a Grotesque Animal" Released: July 27, 2010

Professional ratings
Aggregate scores
Source	Rating
Metacritic	80/100
Review scores
Source	Rating
AllMusic	4/5 stars
The A.V. Club	B
Entertainment Weekly	B+
The Guardian	3/5 stars
Los Angeles Times	3.5/4 stars
NME	7/10
Pitchfork	8.7/10
Q	4/5 stars
Rolling Stone	3/5 stars
Spin	3.5/5 stars

Hissing Fauna, Are You the Destroyer? is the eighth album by American indie pop band of Montreal, released on January 7, 2007. The album was written, performed, and recorded by Kevin Barnes, with assistance from friends and family: prominent Elephant Six members Bryan Poole, Jamey Huggins and Heather McIntosh, as well as Barnes' wife Nina Grottland, credited as Nina Twin, and daughter Alabee Barnes, credited as Alabee Blonde. Credits also feature Georgie Fruit, a glam rock alter ego of Barnes.

== Background ==
Barnes has described the album as a concept album, detailing their transformation from Kevin Barnes into Georgie Fruit. Georgie Fruit exists as Kevin Barnes' alter ego, which they will assume for the final half of the album, as well as the two subsequent LPs, Skeletal Lamping and False Priest. According to "Labyrinthian Pomp", Georgie Fruit is a "dark mutation for my demented past time". The transformation takes place during "The Past Is a Grotesque Animal", the 12-minute-long "turning point" of the album. In addition, the album namechecks many things commonly associated with glam rock, such as drugs, art and fashion; "The Past Is a Grotesque Animal" alludes to Edward Albee's play Who's Afraid of Virginia Woolf? and specifically mentions Georges Bataille's novella Story of the Eye.

Barnes credits their being prescribed antidepressants with the making of the album. "The real issue was a chemical thing, so when I finally got on medication, that balanced it out. So that helped me have a better perspective on things and helped my relationship with my wife and helped me through [the album]." "Heimdalsgate Like a Promethean Curse", the album's first single, chronicles their struggle with chemical imbalance and mood disorders.

== Track listing ==
All songs written by Kevin Barnes.

Hissing Fauna, Are You the Destroyer? track listing
No.	Title	Length
1.	"Suffer for Fashion"	2:59
2.	"Sink the Seine"	1:04
3.	"Cato as a Pun"	3:02
4.	"Heimdalsgate Like a Promethean Curse"	3:18
5.	"Gronlandic Edit"	3:24
6.	"A Sentence of Sorts in Kongsvinger"	4:54
7.	"The Past Is a Grotesque Animal"	11:52
8.	"Bunny Ain't No Kind of Rider"	3:51
9.	"Faberge Falls for Shuggie"	4:31
10.	"Labyrinthian Pomp"	3:21
11.	"She's a Rejecter"	3:42
12.	"We Were Born the Mutants Again with Leafling"	4:12
Total length:		51:33

Australian bonus tracks
No.	Title	Info	Length
13.	"She Fell In Love"	An alternate title for "Du Og Meg", based on the first line of the song.	2:21
14.	"Voltaic Crusher"		2:04

Double vinyl bonus tracks, Icons, Abstract Thee EP.
No.	Title	Length
13.	"Du Og Meg"	2:21
14.	"Voltaic Crusher/Undrum to Muted Da"	2:04
15.	"Derailments in a Place of Our Own"	3:03
16.	"Miss Blonde Your Papa Is Failing"	3:55
17.	"No Conclusion"	9:42

== Charts ==
=== Album ===
Year	Chart	Position
2007	The Billboard 200	72
2007	Billboard Top Independent Albums	2
