= Westover High School =

Westover High School may refer to:

- Westover High School (Fayetteville, North Carolina)
- Westover Comprehensive High School, Albany, Georgia
