= Now Listen =

Now Listen may refer to:

- Now Listen (The Chocolate Rockets album), 2005
- Now Listen (James Husband album), 2005
- Now, Listen!, a 2001 album by Solid Steel
- Now Listen, a 2007 album by Shakin' Stevens
