= Daughter of Cloud =

Compilation album by of Montreal
- Released: October 23, 2012
- Recorded: Sunlandic Studios (Athens, Georgia)
- Genre: Psychedelic pop, progressive rock, experimental rock
- Length: 56:18
- Label: Polyvinyl
- Producer: Kevin Barnes

Of Montreal chronology
Paralytic Stalks (2012)	Daughter of Cloud (2012)	Lousy With Sylvianbriar (2013)

Professional ratings
Aggregate scores
Source	Rating
Metacritic	65/100
Review scores
Source	Rating
AllMusic	3.5/5 stars
Clash	8/10
Filter	83%
Pitchfork	5.8/10

Daughter of Cloud is a compilation album by psychedelic pop group of Montreal. It was released on the Polyvinyl website and in stores on October 23, 2012. It contains 17 rarities that the band have recorded since 2007, 10 unreleased and 7 from deleted CDs or 7-inch singles. The album was also released in a special-edition "Cyan" vinyl, which was limited to 500 copies.

== Critical reception ==
The Line of Best Fit wrote that "existing converts will delight in the psychedelic cacophony, but those entering of Montreal’s world for the first time will most likely be left in a state of upheaval and disarray, slightly suffocated by the sheer diversity of ideas packed into such a small space."

== Track listing ==
No.	Title	Length
1.	"Our Love is Senile"	3:54
2.	"Obviousatonicnuncio"	3:01
3.	"Sails, Hermaphroditic"	3:34
4.	"Steppin' Out"	2:35
5.	"Hindlopp Stat"	4:33
6.	"Partizan Terminus"	2:01
7.	"Georgie's Lament"	4:16
8.	"Jan Doesn't Like It"	2:51
9.	"Feminine Effects"	3:41
10.	"Tender Fax"	3:16
11.	"Psychotic Feeling"	2:56
12.	"Alter Eagle"	2:32
13.	"Kristiansand"	2:58
14.	"Micro University"	2:49
15.	"Subtext Read, Nothing New"	2:28
16.	"Noir Blues to Tinnitus"	5:18
17.	"Expecting to Fly" (Buffalo Springfield cover)	3:44
