= James Husband =

James Husband may refer to:

- James Husband (music project), the recording project of James Huggins III, Of Montreal's multi-instrumentalist
- James Husband (footballer) (born 1994), English footballer
- Jimmy Husband (born 1947), English footballer
