= Icons, Abstract Thee =

EP by of Montreal
- Released: January 23, 2007
- Recorded: 2006
- Genre: Indie pop
- Length: 21:06
- Label: Polyvinyl
- Producer: Kevin Barnes

Of Montreal chronology
Hissing Fauna, Are You the Destroyer? (2007)	Icons, Abstract Thee (2007)	Skeletal Lamping (2008)

Professional ratings
Review scores
Source	Rating
Pitchfork Media	(8.0/10)

Icons, Abstract Thee is an EP from indie pop band of Montreal. It was released January 23, 2007, along with the album Hissing Fauna, Are You the Destroyer? and the promo CD single "Heimdalsgate Like a Promethean Curse". It is a collection of songs from recent singles, bonus tracks from the vinyl edition of Hissing Fauna, and a song that was put up on the band's Myspace page.

== Structure ==
The first track, "Du Og Meg" (Norwegian for "you and me"), discusses the manner in which lead singer Kevin Barnes and wife Nina met and courted each other. "Voltaic Crusher/Undrum to Muted Da" is about the quickly fading love between the two, a theme present in Hissing Fauna…, particularly in "The Past Is a Grotesque Animal".

The second part of the song, "Undrum to Muted Da", is a short instrumental piece leading into the next song, "Derailments in a Place of Our Own". "Derailments" is a solo acoustic performance that lyrically details Kevin's deepest depression. The EP-only track "Miss Blonde Your Papa Is Failing" refers to Kevin's daughter in the title. Its lyrics explain a breakup between him and Nina as gently as possible to his daughter Alabee.

"No Conclusion" is the longest song on the EP. It is about the suicidal thoughts harbored by Barnes. The song's lyrics mention this specifically but describe a figurative suicide. In his review published by Pitchfork Media, Rob Mitchum stated that "No Conclusion" would "likely end up as one of 2007's finest musical accomplishments".

== Track listing ==
All tracks are written by Kevin Barnes.

No.	Title	Length
1.	"Du Og Meg"	2:21
2.	"Voltaic Crusher/Undrum to Muted Da"	2:04
3.	"Derailments in a Place of Our Own"	3:03
4.	"Miss Blonde Your Papa Is Failing"	3:55
5.	"No Conclusion"	9:41

== Credits ==
- Mastered by Glenn Schick
- Artwork by David Barnes
