= Lady on the Cusp =

Studio album by of Montreal
- Released: May 17, 2024
- Genre: Psychedelic pop, funk
- Length: 34:56
- Label: Polyvinyl
- Producer: Kevin Barnes

Of Montreal chronology
Freewave Lucifer Fck Fck Fck (2022)	Lady on the Cusp (2024)	Aethermead (2026)

Singles from Lady on the Cusp
- 1. "Yung Hearts Bleed Free" Released: March 5, 2024; 2. "Rude Girl on Rotation" Released: April 16, 2024; 3. "Soporific Cell" Released: May 14, 2024

Professional ratings
Aggregate scores
Source	Rating
Metacritic	67/100
Review scores
Source	Rating
AllMusic	3.0/5 stars
Exclaim!	7/10
PopMatters	6/10
Under the Radar	7/10

Lady on the Cusp is the nineteenth studio album by American indie rock band of Montreal. It was released on May 17, 2024, through Polyvinyl Record Co.

== Background ==
Prior to the album's release, Kevin Barnes and his partner Christina Schneider left Athens, Georgia for the state of Vermont. The process of relocating from his home of nearly three decades directly inspired this album. A press release refers to Lady on the Cusp as a "reintroduction" to the band, continuing on a "path forward rather" instead of revisiting "past sounds". The album announcement on March 5, 2024, also saw the release of the lead single "Yung Hearts Bleed Free", which was inspired by Leos Carax's Boy Meets Girl (1984), the group Bootsy's Rubber Band and the purchase of a Yamaha TG33 and a Kawai K1M. With the track, Barnes aimed at a "strutting, sexy little vamp of a song" that came out "playful and free". A North American tour to support the album took place from May to July 2024.

== Track listing ==
All tracks are written by Kevin Barnes.

Lady on the Cusp track listing
No.	Title	Length
1.	"Music Hurts the Head"	3:48
2.	"2 Depressed 2 Fuck"	2:47
3.	"Rude Girl on Rotation"	2:40
4.	"Yung Hearts Bleed Free"	3:50
5.	"Soporific Cell"	5:17
6.	"I Can Read Smoke"	2:15
7.	"Pi$$ Pi$$"	4:04
8.	"Sea Mines That Mr. Gone"	3:30
9.	"Poetry Surf"	2:17
10.	"Genius in the Wind"	4:28
Total length:		34:56

== Personnel ==
- Kevin Barnes – vocals, guitar, synthesizer, production, engineering
- Mike Nolte – mastering
- Clayton Rychlik – drums, percussion, and xylophone on "Soporific Cell"
- Jojo Glidewell – piano and synthesizer on "Soporific Cell", saxophone on "Sea Mines That Mr. Gone"
