= Westover High School (Fayetteville, North Carolina) =

American public school in North Carolina

Location
- 277 Bonanza Drive; Fayetteville, North Carolina 28303; United States; 35°05′06″N 78°59′14″W

Information
- Type: Public
- Motto: Powerful Beyond Measure
- Established: 1977 (49 years ago)
- School district: Cumberland County Schools
- CEEB code: 341327
- Principal: Vernon Lowery
- Teaching staff: 63.34 (on FTE basis)
- Grades: 9–12
- Enrollment: 1,244 (2023–2024)
- Student to teacher ratio: 19.64
- Schedule type: Block
- Colors: Blue and grey
- Athletics conference: 5A-6A Eastern Sandhills
- Sports: Football, Baseball, Basketball, Wrestling, Track&Field, Soccer, Softball, and Volleyball
- Mascot: Wolverine
- Feeder schools: Westover Middle, Anne Chesnutt Middle
- Website: wohs.ccs.k12.nc.us

Westover High School is a public high school located in Fayetteville, North Carolina, United States. It is a member of Cumberland County Schools (CCS).

== History ==
In the early 1900s, a small one room school house was built off what is now Morganton Road. Writing on simple desks and seated on wooden benches, students attended school only three months out of the year and teachers received only an average income of twenty dollars a month.

On November 10, 1924, Macpherson, Glendale, Galatia, Raymount, Kornbow, and Westover schools were consolidated to form Seventy-First High School. Fifty years later, plans were once again made for a separate Westover. First, the junior high was built, and then two years later plans for the senior high followed.

The new school, which cost approximately five million dollars to build, encountered problems before its completion. Work on the building fell behind schedule and the school opened four months late. Consequently, the senior high school students had to go on a split shift with Westover Junior High. The seventh through ninth graders attended school from 7:30am to 12:30pm, and the high school students went to school from 1:30pm to 6:15pm.

After the move to the senior high at the end of October 1977, the building was not completely finished, but Westover was again a separate school. Much of the initial student body and faculty came from Seventy-First.

The principal at the time of opening was Doctor William Shipp.

== Athletics ==
The Lady Wolverines won the 2007–2008 State 4A Women's Basketball Championship.

The men’s basketball team tied (due to cancellation of the state championship game because of COVID) for state champion in 2020 with a 30-0 record under Coach Stackhouse.

== Notable alumni ==
- Dottie Alexander — keyboardist for the band of Montreal
- Affion Crockett — actor, writer, dancer, rapper, comedian, and music producer
- Eric Maynor — NBA player
- Marshall Pitts Jr. — lawyer and politician
- Dennis L.A. White — stage and screen actor
