= Aureate Gloom =

Studio album by of Montreal
- Released: March 2, 2015
- Recorded: Sonic Ranch (Tornillo, Texas)
- Genre: Glam rock
- Length: 43:28
- Label: Polyvinyl
- Producer: Kevin Barnes

Of Montreal chronology
Lousy with Sylvianbriar (2013)	Aureate Gloom (2015)	Innocence Reaches (2016)

Singles from Aureate Gloom
- 1. "Bassem Sabry" Released: December 9, 2014

Aureate Gloom is the thirteenth studio album by indie rock band of Montreal. It was released in the UK on March 2, 2015, and in the US on March 3. On February 18, the album was made available for instant download on the Polyvinyl Record Co. website, two weeks before its retail release date.

== Reception ==
Professional ratings
Aggregate scores
Source	Rating
Metacritic	67/100
Review scores
Source	Rating
Allmusic	4/5 stars
The A.V. Club	B-
Consequence of Sound	C+
DIY	4/5 stars
Drowned in Sound	6/10
Pitchfork Media	7/10
Popmatters	5/10 discs
Rolling Stone	3/5 stars
Sputnikmusic	2.6/5
Exclaim!	8/10
Inveterate	6/10

Aureate Gloom received positive reviews from critics. On the review aggregate site Metacritic, the album has a score of 67 out of 100, indicating "generally favorable reviews".

== Track listing ==
All tracks are written by Kevin Barnes.

No.	Title	Length
1.	"Bassem Sabry"	4:45
2.	"Last Rites at the Jane Hotel"	5:02
3.	"Empyrean Abattoir"	4:32
4.	"Aluminum Crown"	3:34
5.	"Virgilian Lots"	3:21
6.	"Monolithic Egress"	5:23
7.	"Apollyon of Blue Room"	3:56
8.	"Estocadas"	4:20
9.	"Chthonian Dirge for Uruk the Other"	2:48
10.	"Like Ashoka's Inferno of Memory"	5:49

== Personnel ==
of Montreal

- Kevin Barnes – vocals, guitars
- Clayton Rychlik – drums, percussion, clarinet, vocals
- Jojo Glidewell – keys, synth
- Bob Parins – bass, clarinet
- Bennett Lewis – guitars
- Kishi Bashi – strings, vocals

Production

- Drew Vandenberg – engineer, mixing
- Charles Godfrey – assistant engineer
- Greg Calbi – mastering

Artwork

- David Barnes – artwork
- Jerrod Landon Porter – layout, lettering
