= Rune Husk =

EP by Of Montreal
- Released: January 13, 2017
- Genre: Indie rock, indie pop
- Length: 17:23
- Label: Polyvinyl Record Co.

Of Montreal chronology
Innocence Reaches (2016)	Rune Husk (2017)	White Is Relic/Irrealis Mood (2018)

Rune Husk is a 2017 EP by Of Montreal and has been said to sound like "Ziggy Stardust".

== Track listing ==
No.	Title	Length
1.	"Internecine Larks"	04:14
2.	"Stag to the Stable"	03:34
3.	"Widowsucking"	04:29
4.	"Island Life"	05:06
Total length:		17:23
