= Paralytic Stalks =

Studio album by of Montreal
- Released: February 7, 2012
- Recorded: Sunlandic Studios (Athens, Georgia)
- Genres: Psychedelic pop; psychedelic rock; experimental pop
- Length: 58:05
- Label: Polyvinyl
- Producer: Kevin Barnes

Of Montreal chronology
thecontrollersphere (2011)	Paralytic Stalks (2012)	Daughter of Cloud (2012)

Professional ratings
Aggregate scores
Source	Rating
Metacritic	62/100
Review scores
Source	Rating
AllMusic	3.5/5 stars
The A.V. Club	B+
Consequence of Sound	3.5/5 stars
Drowned In Sound	7/10
Paste Magazine	7.2/10
Pitchfork	4.6/10
Rolling Stone	3/5 stars
Sputnikmusic	3.5/5 stars
Tiny Mix Tapes	4.5/5 marks
Under the Radar	8/10 stars

Paralytic Stalks is the eleventh full-length studio album by American group of Montreal. It was released on the Polyvinyl website and in stores on February 7, 2012. The band released the album in several formats, including music download, CD, cassette, vinyl, and a special-edition "Fuchsia Purple" vinyl, which was limited to 1,500 copies. Later pressings of the vinyl were offered in yellow as well as black vinyl. All physical versions of the album featured free digital downloads. To support the release of the album, of Montreal toured America in early 2012.

== Sound and style ==
The recording of the album is dense, featuring dark tones and an indiscriminate eclectic nature both electronically and aesthetically. The album features a wide array of music, ranging from "pseudo-country" and, to a larger degree, neo-prog often switching and mixing music styles multiple times through the course of a song. Most of the recording was done with a Synclavier 9600 workstation. Kevin Barnes's lyricism also returns to the confessional style heard in Hissing Fauna, Are You the Destroyer?, entailing dark topics such as revenge, self-hatred, the human condition, and their painful relationship with their wife Nina. It has been called their most personal recording to date.

== Recording ==
The album was recorded in Barnes' personal studio and was mixed at Chase Park Transduction with engineer Drew Vandenberg, who has mixed albums by Toro y Moi, Futurebirds, and Kishi Bashi. Kevin is the producer, songwriter, and co-engineer for the album. The album features a crew of hired session musicians for the first time in of Montreal's history and features horn and flute player Zac Colwell as a new addition to the band's line-up. While Kevin Barnes is known to take primary creative control of their recordings, K. Ishibashi of Kishi Bashi was a known collaborator on this record and was said by Barnes to have helped shape the songs.

== Reception ==
The reception from critics has been mixed, with the average critical score being a 62 out of 100, according to Metacritic. Some have praised its emotional rawness, while others thought its divergence from the band's previous poppy style was alienating.

== Track listing ==
All tracks are written by Kevin Barnes.

No.	Title	Length
1.	"Gelid Ascent"	4:17
2.	"Spiteful Intervention"	3:40
3.	"Dour Percentage"	4:39
4.	"We Will Commit Wolf Murder"	5:41
5.	"Malefic Dowery"	2:36
6.	"Ye, Renew the Plaintiff"	8:45
7.	"Wintered Debts"	7:33
8.	"Exorcismic Breeding Knife"	7:41
9.	"Authentic Pyrrhic Remission"	13:13

== Credits ==
- Mixed by Kevin Barnes and Drew Vandenberg at Chase Park Transduction
- Mastered by Greg Calbi
