= Innocence Reaches =

Studio album by of Montreal
- Released: August 12, 2016
- Genre: Indie rock, synth-pop, neo-psychedelia
- Length: 56:26
- Label: Polyvinyl
- Producer: Kevin Barnes

Of Montreal chronology
Aureate Gloom (2015)	Innocence Reaches (2016)	Rune Husk (2017)

Singles from Innocence Reaches
- 1. "It's Different for Girls" Released: June 1, 2016; 2. "My Fair Lady" Released: July 21, 2016

Innocence Reaches is the fourteenth studio album by American indie rock band of Montreal. It was released on August 12, 2016.

== Music ==
The album has been characterized as electronic, synthpop and psychedelic.

=== Style and influences ===
Kevin Barnes cited the Beach Boys, the Beatles, Jack Ü, Chairlift and Arca as influences for the album.

== Critical reception ==
Professional ratings
Aggregate scores
Source	Rating
AnyDecentMusic?	6.4/10
Metacritic	68/100
Review scores
Source	Rating
AllMusic	3.5/5 stars
The A.V. Club	B+
Consequence of Sound	C+
Exclaim!	8/10
The Guardian	3/5 stars
Pitchfork	6.3/10
Spin	5/10

At Metacritic, which assigns a normalized rating out of 100 to reviews from mainstream publications, the album received an average score of 68, based on 21 reviews. Writing for Exclaim!, Daniel Sylvester praised the "inspired, inventive, re-energized and wide-eyed" sound.

== Track listing ==
Innocence Reaches
No.	Title	Length
1.	"Let's Relate"	3:53
2.	"It's Different for Girls"	4:00
3.	"Gratuitous Abysses"	4:10
4.	"My Fair Lady"	4:25
5.	"Les Chants de Maldoror"	6:04
6.	"A Sport and a Pastime"	4:33
7.	"Ambassador Bridge"	3:37
8.	"Def Pacts"	5:02
9.	"Chaos Arpeggiating"	5:54
10.	"Nursing Slopes"	4:17
11.	"Trashed Exes"	4:15
12.	"Chap Pilot"	6:16
Total length:		56:32

Notes

- Every song is stylized in lowercase.

== Personnel ==
Adapted from AllMusic.

- Bennett Lewis – guitar
- Clayton Rychlik – drums, percussion, piano
- David Barnes – artwork
- Drew Vandenberg – engineer
- Greg Calbi – mastering
- Jerrod Landon Porter – layout, lettering
- JoJo Glidewell – keyboards, piano, synthesizer
- Keiko Ishibashi – violin
- Kevin Barnes – bass, composing, drum programming, engineering, guitar, mixing, producing, synthesizer, vocals
- Philip Mayer – percussion
- Robert Parins – acoustic guitar, pedal steel
- Zac Colwell – brass, woodwind
