= Lousy with Sylvianbriar =

Studio album by of Montreal
- Released: October 8, 2013
- Genres: Indie folk, folk rock, psychedelic pop, indie pop
- Length: 45:29
- Label: Polyvinyl
- Producer: Kevin Barnes

Of Montreal chronology
Daughter of Cloud (2012)	Lousy with Sylvianbriar (2013)	Aureate Gloom (2015)

Singles from Lousy with Sylvianbriar
- 1. "Fugitive Air" Released: July 23, 2013

Lousy with Sylvianbriar is the twelfth studio album by indie rock band of Montreal. It was released on 8 October 2013. It was recorded at Sunlandic Studios. All songs were engineered by Drew Vandenberg except "Raindrop In My Skull" and "Colossus" done by Kevin Barnes.

== Critical reception ==
Professional ratings
Aggregate scores
Source	Rating
Metacritic	(72/100)
Review scores
Source	Rating
AllMusic	4.5/5 stars
The A.V. Club	(B−)
Consequence of Sound	4/5 stars
Earbuddy	(5.5/10)
Paste	(9.2/10)
Pitchfork	(7.4/10)
PopMatters	8/10
Sputnikmusic	(3.8/5)
Under the Gun	9.4/10
Under the Radar	7/10 stars

Lousy with Sylvianbriar was met with "generally favorable" reviews from critics. At Metacritic, which assigns a weighted average rating out of 100 to reviews from mainstream publications, this release received an average score of 72, based on 25 reviews.

== Track listing ==
All tracks are written by Kevin Barnes.

No.	Title	Length
1.	"Fugitive Air"	4:13
2.	"Obsidian Currents"	3:54
3.	"Belle Glade Missionaries"	5:55
4.	"Sirens of Your Toxic Spirit"	4:06
5.	"Colossus"	3:36
6.	"Triumph of Disintegration"	4:12
7.	"Amphibian Days"	5:04
8.	"She Ain't Speakin' Now"	3:40
9.	"Hegira Émigré"	4:02
10.	"Raindrop in My Skull"	2:47
11.	"Imbecile Rages"	4:01

== Artwork and packaging ==
The motorcycle shown on the cover is a Honda CL360 from the mid-1970s.

== Personnel ==
- Kevin Barnes – vocals, guitar, bass guitar
- Rebecca Cash – vocals
- Clayton Rychlik – drums, percussion, vocals
- Jojo Glidewell – piano, keys
- Bennett Lewis – guitars, mandolin, vocals
- Bob Parins – bass guitar, pedal steel, upright bass

Additional performers

- Kishi Bashi – strings on "Hegira Emigre"
- Laura Lutzke – strings on "Raindrop in My Skull"
- Marie Davon – strings on "Sirens of Your Toxic Spirit

== Charts ==
Chart performance for Lousy with Sylvianbriar
Chart (2013)	Peak position
US Billboard 200	115
US Independent Albums (Billboard)	21
US Top Rock Albums (Billboard)	40

== Release History ==
Country	Date	Format	Label
United States	8 October 2013	CD; Digital download	Polyvinyl
France	8 October 2013	CD; Digital download	Polyvinyl
Australia	8 October 2013	CD; Digital download	Polyvinyl
