= White Is Relic/Irrealis Mood =

Studio album by of Montreal
- Released: March 9, 2018
- Genre: Neo-psychedelia, progressive pop, electropop, experimental pop
- Length: 40:28
- Label: Polyvinyl
- Producer: Kevin Barnes

Of Montreal chronology
Rune Husk (2017)	White Is Relic/Irrealis Mood (2018)	UR FUN (2020)

Professional ratings
Aggregate scores
Source	Rating
AnyDecentMusic?	6.6/10
Metacritic	69/100
Review scores
Source	Rating
AllMusic	3.5/5 stars
The A.V. Club	B
DIY'	2/5 stars
Exclaim!	7/10
Pitchfork	7.2/10
Spin	5/10
Under the Radar	7.5/10

White Is Relic/Irrealis Mood is the fifteenth studio album by American indie rock band of Montreal, released on March 9, 2018.

== Music ==
Singer Kevin Barnes said the album's sound was influenced by 1980s-style "extended dance mixes" and explained that he "also decided to abandon the 'live band in a room' approach." Barnes listed Angela Davis, Noam Chomsky, Chris Kraus, Ta-Nehisi Coates, Malcolm X, and Mark E. Smith as lyrical influences.

== Track listing ==
No.	Title	Length
1.	"Soft Music/Juno Portraits of the Jovian Sky"	5:36
2.	"Paranoiac Intervals/Body Dysmorphia"	7:16
3.	"Writing the Circles/Orgone Tropics"	6:15
4.	"Plateau Phase/No Careerism No Corruption"	5:19
5.	"Sophie Calle Private Game/Every Person Is a Pussy, Every Pussy Is a Star!"	8:09
6.	"If You Talk to Symbol/Hostility Voyeur"	8:33
Total length:		41:08

== Charts ==
Chart performance for White Is Relic/Irrealis Mood
Chart	Peak position
US Independent Albums (Billboard)	18
US Vinyl Albums (Billboard)	12
