= AMOC (disambiguation) =

AMOC or Amoc may refer to:

- Atlantic meridional overturning circulation, current in the Atlantic Ocean
- Alaska Mission Operations Center, a US National Security Agency base
- Amoc (rapper), a Finnish Sámi rapper
- Aston Martin Owners Club, a car enthusiasts' club
