= Ur Fun =

Studio album by Of Montreal
- Released: January 17, 2020
- Recorded: 2019
- Studios: Sunlandic (Athens, Georgia)
- Genres: Synth-pop; bubblegum pop
- Length: 40:30
- Label: Polyvinyl
- Producer: Kevin Barnes

Of Montreal chronology
White Is Relic/Irrealis Mood (2018)	Ur Fun (2020)	I Feel Safe with You, Trash (2021)

Professional ratings
Aggregate scores
Source	Rating
AnyDecentMusic?	7.1/10
Metacritic	76/100
Review scores
Source	Rating
AllMusic	4.0/5 stars
Exclaim!	7/10
Pitchfork	5.9/10
Uncut	8/10
Under the Radar	6.5/10

Ur Fun (stylised in all caps) is the sixteenth studio album by American indie rock band Of Montreal, released on January 17, 2020.

== Music ==
The album was inspired by 1980s synth-pop, specifically Cyndi Lauper's She's So Unusual and Janet Jackson's Control. Their new relationship with Locate S,1 singer Christina Schneider was also cited, her backing vocals being prominently featured throughout.

== Track listing ==
No.	Title	Length
1.	"Peace to All Freaks"	4:44
2.	"Polyaneurism"	3:30
3.	"Get God's Attention by Being an Atheist"	3:50
4.	"Gypsy That Remains"	4:18
5.	"You've Had Me Everywhere"	4:46
6.	"Carmillas of Love"	3:59
7.	"Don't Let Me Die in America"	3:35
8.	"St. Sebastian"	4:05
9.	"Deliberate Self-harm Ha Ha"	4:20
10.	"20th Century Schizofriendic Revengoid Man"	3:23
Total length:		40:30

== Personnel ==
- Kevin Barnes – vocals, all instruments, production, mixing, engineering, art direction
- Christina Schneider – backing vocals, art direction, photography
- Mike Nolte – mastering
- Jerrod Landon Porter – design, layout
