= Heimdalsgate Like a Promethean Curse =

Single by Of Montreal

from the album Hissing Fauna, Are You the Destroyer?
- Released: January 23, 2007
- Genre: Indie pop, neo-psychedelia
- Length: 3:18
- Label: Polyvinyl
- Songwriter: Kevin Barnes
- Producer: Kevin Barnes

Of Montreal singles chronology
"She's a Rejector" (2006)	"Heimdalsgate Like a Promethean Curse" (2007)	"Suffer for Fashion" (2007)

"Heimdalsgate Like a Promethean Curse" is the first single released by Polyvinyl Records from Of Montreal's 2007 album Hissing Fauna, Are You the Destroyer?. Like the rest of the album, the song was written, performed and recorded by Kevin Barnes. The music video was directed by The Brothers Chaps.

The song opens with a Roland Jupiter 8 bass into a lead made with a Sequential Circuits Prophet 5. Along with a LinnDrum and an electric piano, the quirky electronics give the song a 1985 feel.

In an early review of the song, posted shortly after the leak of the album in September 2006, Pitchfork Media's Andy Dubbin describes it as "one of the more breakneck, 'old Of Montreal'-styled songs on an otherwise discofunk-lite album, bringing proper attention to itself without overextending its theme."

== Song meaning ==
In his review for Pitchfork, Dubbin suggests that "'Heimdalsgate' takes up the drugs-as-artistic-inspiration vs. drugs-as-personal-ruin dilemma and plays it out with equally conflicted musical gestures." According to Kevin Barnes, this interpretation is not valid. Asked "Are you a stoner?" by The Stranger's Christopher Frizzelle in direct reference to the song's "chemicals", Barnes says, "Yeah, that has nothing to do with drugs. That's the chemicals in your mind."

FRIZZELLE: Serotonin?

BARNES: Yeah. I went through this chemical depression, and that's when I was writing a lot of the songs for Hissing Fauna. They're all songs about that experience. And I was experiencing it in the moment that I was writing the songs, and sort of asking myself: What the hell is going on? Why are you all of a sudden totally paranoid and plagued by these anxieties? And why is everything so distorted and confusing and fucked up? My lifestyle hadn't changed that much. And then I realized, well, there's something going on inside of me that I don't have control over, and then you realize how vulnerable you are to these things, these elements that you can't understand, or unless you go on medication and get it under control. It's like you're being betrayed by your body.

FRIZZELLE: Sometimes if you just put on a dress or something your whole mood can change.

BARNES: To some degree. I'd gotten to that point where nothing was working. I was borderline suicidal, and my relationship with my girlfriend had totally eroded and she'd gone back to Norway with our daughter and everything was totally fucked, and I was just like, What can I do? "The Past Is a Grotesque Animal" is about that. The lyrics tell the story of what was really going on and the music sort of represents this other emotion that I wish existed. The music was really happy because I wanted to make something that would lift my spirits.

"Heimdalsgate" is the name of the street in Oslo on which Barnes lived; the suffix "-gate" translates from the Norwegian language to mean "street." The name of the street is more precisely Heimdalsgata, Heimdalsgate with the article "the" before it. "Promethean Curse" alludes to the ancient myth of Prometheus; Barnes is thought to be employing the curse as it pertains to "the burdens of consciousness and creativity" inflicted upon mankind when, against the demands of Zeus, Prometheus brought fire to earth.

Heimdal is the Norse god that guards the frozen rainbow bridge between Asgård, where the gods live and Jotunheim (or Udgård) where the Jötnar (jætter) live. At the Norse Armageddon, Ragnarok, he will blow his horn.
