= Aethermead =

Studio album by of Montreal
- Released: June 5, 2026
- Studios: The Honey Jar (Brooklyn); Sunlandic (Brooklyn)
- Genre: Indie rock • art pop • chamber pop • dream pop • post-punk
- Length: 41:18
- Label: Polyvinyl
- Producer: Kevin Barnes

of Montreal chronology
Lady on the Cusp (2024)	Aethermead (2026)

Singles from Aethermead
- 1. "When" Released: April 2, 2026; 2. "Already Dreaming" Released: May 5, 2026; 3. "Take the Form" Released: June 2, 2026

Aethermead, stylized in all lowercase, is the twentieth studio album of American indie rock band of Montreal. It was released on June 5, 2026, through Polyvinyl Records.

== Background ==
Before writing the album, singer Kevin Barnes split from his then-fiancée Christina Schneider after eight years. After the break-up, Barnes moved from Vermont to Brooklyn, where he was then inspired to create the new album. The album was announced on April 2, 2026, along with the release of a new single, "When". A month prior to the album's announcement, the band announced a tour with openers CorMae and Sloppy Jane. The album's title is based off the Nethermead area in Prospect Park. On May 5, the second single from the album released, "Already Dreaming". The music video that released alongside it was directed by Beatrice Barnes, the daughter of Kevin Barnes. The band's third single released June 2, a song titled "Take the Form".

== Tour ==
On June 19, 2026, of Montreal started their summer North American tour in support of the album at the 40 Watt Club in the band's hometown of Athens, Georgia. The openers CorMae and Sloppy Jane are listed to both open for the band for each half of the tour dates respectively, the sole exception being one show in Nashville, Tennessee where no opener is listed. For a show at The Sinclair in Cambridge, Massachusetts, a second opener performed along with CorMae, Boyhood. The tour concluded on August 8, 2026, in Birmingham, Alabama.

This tour was the first to feature Matthew Danger Lippman with the band since joining on guitar and keys.

== Track listing ==
All tracks are written by Kevin Barnes.

aethermead track listing
No.	Title	Length
1.	"Already Dreaming"	3:08
2.	"Wanting on Air"	3:02
3.	"Listen to Music and Cry"	2:51
4.	"My Zhe Zhe"	2:23
5.	"Take the Form"	3:05
6.	"When"	2:32
7.	"Hack it Up"	3:22
8.	"Lacan in the Family"	2:54
9.	"Having a Moment"	3:32
10.	"From the Font of You"	4:50
11.	"To Nothing's Reward"	2:32
12.	"Now We Cringe at the Thought"	3:24
13.	"Dismissal Mosaics"	3:43
Total length:		41:18

== Personnel ==
Credits are adapted from the album's Bandcamp page.

=== of Montreal ===
- Kevin Barnes – vocals, guitars, slide guitars, pianos, synthesizers, percussion, production, mixing, engineering
- Ross Brand – bass guitars, guitars
- Clayton Rychlik – drums, vibraphone, synthesizers, percussion
- Jojo Glidewell – pianos, synthesizers, keys

=== Additional contributors ===
- Drew Vandenberg – engineering
- Mike Nolte – mastering
- David Barnes – artwork
- Ryan Miller – layout

== Critical reception ==
Professional ratings
Aggregate scores
Source	Rating
Metacritic	74/100
Review scores
Source	Rating
Beats Per Minute	76/100
Far Out	4/5
Paste	B+
Pitchfork	6.1/10

The album released to mixed-to-positive reviews. Paste magazine praised the album's vulnerability and the "band-centric" focus. Far Out magazine also praised the lyricism on the album, Reuben Cross writing "(...) they’ve pared back the loquaciousness and gone for a more direct approach that sparingly flaunts how literary they can be."

Pitchfork's Ethan Beck wrote that the music is "drab" and "lacks the personality and vision of their best work" and rated the album a 6.1/10.
