= Amok (The Late B.P. Helium album) =

Studio album by The Late B.P. Helium
- Released: 2004
- Genres: Indie rock, Garage rock revival
- Label: Orange Twin

The Late B.P. Helium chronology
Kumquat Mae (2002)	Amok (2004)

Professional ratings
Review scores
Source	Rating
Pitchfork	(6.5/10)
PopMatters	

Amok is the first full-length album by Elephant Six musician The Late B.P. Helium. It was released in 2004 on Orange Twin Records.

== Track listing ==
All tracks by Bryan Poole, except where noted.

1. "Belief System Derailment Scenario" - 4:20
2. "Bluebeard" (Bryan Poole, Taylor Davis, Aaron Wegelin) - 2:00
3. "The Ballad of Johnny Rad" - 2:16
4. "Rabbit's Ear" - 3:23
5. "They Broke the Speed of Light" - 6:35
6. "Emperor's Drone" - 3:22
7. "Candy for Everyone" - 3:40
8. "Curse of the Trial" - 3:10
9. "I Tried to Make It with You" - 3:16
10. "Reminder to Self" - 2:50
11. "Raisa Raisa" - 5:04
