= Skeletal Lamping =

2008 album by of Montreal

Studio album by of Montreal
- Released: October 21, 2008
- Genres: Indie pop, funk, psychedelic pop, progressive pop, experimental rock
- Length: 57:56
- Label: Polyvinyl
- Producer: Kevin Barnes

Of Montreal chronology
Icons, Abstract Thee (2007)	Skeletal Lamping (2008)	False Priest (2010)

Singles from Skeletal Lamping
- 1. "An Eluardian Instance" Released: 2008; 2. "Id Engager" Released: September 9, 2008; 3. "For Our Elegant Caste" Released: June 23, 2009

Professional ratings
Aggregate scores
Source	Rating
Metacritic	71/100
Review scores
Source	Rating
Allmusic	2.5/5 stars
The A.V. Club	(B)
Blender	4.5/5 stars
ChartAttack	4.5/5 stars
Drowned in Sound	(9/10)
Pitchfork	(5.9/10)
PopMatters	(6/10)
Rolling Stone	3.5/5 stars
Tiny Mix Tapes	3/5 stars
URB	4.5/5 stars

Skeletal Lamping is the ninth studio album by Athens, Georgia-based band of Montreal.

== Style ==
As with most of Montreal albums, Kevin Barnes performed almost all the instrumental and vocal tracks himself.

== Distribution ==
Skeletal Lamping was released on October 21, 2008. The album was released in different formats, including conventional CD and vinyl, as well as T-shirts, a button set, wall decals, and a paper lantern, the latter formats including a digital download code for the album itself.

All items for the collection were designed by The Bee With Wheels (David Barnes) and Gemini Tactics (Nina Barnes), a coalition termed the 'Apollinaire Rave Collective'. In an essay addressing the concept behind the album's release, Kevin Barnes stated "We feel that there’s no reason to produce another object that just sits on a shelf. We only want to produce objects that have a function and that can be treasured for their singularness."

== Georgie Fruit ==
Kevin Barnes at a 2007 show in San Francisco

Georgie Fruit is the name of Kevin Barnes' African-American cross-dressing stage persona, similar in many ways to David Bowie's alter ego Ziggy Stardust. Georgie Fruit was first mentioned on Montreal's 2007 album Hissing Fauna, Are You the Destroyer? during the song "Labyrinthian Pomp". Georgie Fruit plays a prominent role on Skeletal Lamping.

In a post made on the of Montreal website in September 2020, Barnes expressed regret for the "problematic" characterization of Georgie, apologizing for giving him a race and gender other than his own in his lyrical depiction. Barnes replaced the song "Wicked Wisdom" on streaming and all future pressings of "Skeletal Lamping" to remove a slur for trans people.

Polyvinyl Records has arranged to donate 50% of the proceeds of Skeletal Lamping to Black Trans Advocacy Coalition, an organization dedicated to address material inequities faced by transgender black people.

== Track listing ==
All songs written by Kevin Barnes.

1. "Nonpareil of Favor" – 5:48
2. "Wicked Wisdom" – 5:00
3. "For Our Elegant Caste" – 2:35
4. "Touched Something's Hollow" – 1:26
5. "An Eluardian Instance" – 4:35
6. "Gallery Piece" – 3:48
7. "Women's Studies Victims" – 2:59
8. "St. Exquisite's Confessions" – 4:35
9. "Triphallus, to Punctuate!" – 3:23
10. "And I've Seen a Bloody Shadow" – 2:23
11. "Plastis Wafer" – 7:11
12. "Death Isn't a Parallel Move" – 3:01
13. "Beware Our Nubile Miscreants" – 4:52
14. "Mingusings" – 3:01
15. "Id Engager" – 3:24

=== Polyvinyl digital bonus EP ===
1. Jimmy (M.I.A. cover) - 3:46
2. Feminine Effects - 2:56
3. Little Rock - 0:58
