= False Priest =

Studio album by of Montreal
- Released: September 14, 2010
- Studios: Apollinaire Rave studio (Athens, Georgia); Ocean Way Recording (Los Angeles, California)
- Genres: Psychedelic pop, dance pop, R&B
- Length: 53:43
- Label: Polyvinyl
- Producers: Kevin Barnes, Jon Brion

Of Montreal chronology
Skeletal Lamping (2008)	False Priest (2010)	thecontrollersphere (2011)

False Priest is the tenth full-length studio album by indie-pop group of Montreal, released on September 14, 2010 by Polyvinyl Records on CD, digital, and 180-gram vinyl in both red and black. In addition, Joyful Noise Recordings released a limited-edition cassette version of the album, making False Priest the first of Montreal album ever released on cassette.

== Singles ==
On June 25, 2010, the first single, "Coquet Coquette", was released as a free mp3, along with album art and pre-order information on the band's website. On July 7, 2010, the second single, "Hydra Fancies", was released on Somekindofawesome.com

== Videos ==
There are two official music videos inside False Priest. The first single, as mentioned above, Coquet Coquette, and the other, Famine Affair. The latter, stars Josh McKay of Deerhunter, as the main character in it. The material is about a different Earth than our own, that is ruled and dominated by women. Men are distributed into households that they must stay in, one per, where they are used for breeding purposes. The only way for the male to get out of this cycle, is when they pass, or if they become sexually impotent.

== Sound ==
Speaking with Pitchfork, frontperson Kevin Barnes said of the album's sound, "there's a thick R&B influence, so it's cool that we have a lot of deep low end. There's a lot of very dancey, very funky songs... We try to have these 'holy fuck' moments where you're really having your mind blown, especially if you're listening to it on headphones."

The album also features appearances by Janelle Monáe and Solange Knowles, and marks the return of organic instruments such as live drums, strings and pianos.

Professional ratings
Aggregate scores
Source	Rating
Metacritic	74/100
Review scores
Source	Rating
AllMusic	4/5 stars
Consequence of Sound	C+
MSN Music (Expert Witness)	A−
Pitchfork	6.7/10
Spin	9/10
Rolling Stone	3.5/5 stars

== Track listing ==
All tracks are written by Kevin Barnes.

No.	Title	Length
1.	"I Feel Ya' Strutter"	3:40
2.	"Our Riotous Defects" (feat. Janelle Monáe)	5:15
3.	"Coquet Coquette"	3:44
4.	"Godly Intersex"	3:31
5.	"Enemy Gene" (feat. Janelle Monáe)	3:37
6.	"Hydra Fancies"	3:25
7.	"Like a Tourist"	4:02
8.	"Sex Karma" (feat. Solange)	4:02
9.	"Girl Named Hello"	4:14
10.	"Famine Affair"	3:49
11.	"Casualty of You"	2:59
12.	"Around the Way"	4:33
13.	"You Do Mutilate?"	6:52

== Charts ==
Chart (2010)	Peak position
US Alternative Albums	11
US Digital Albums	19
US Rock Albums	14
