= James Husband (music project) =

- James Huggins performing in Amiens, on May 26, 2007.

Background information
- Origin: Athens, Georgia, United States
- Genres: Indie pop, indie rock
- Years active: 2004–present
- Labels: Polyvinyl (US), Self released (worldwide)

James Husband is the recording project of James Huggins III, of Montreal's multi-instrumentalist.

== Biography ==
James Husband is the recording alias for multi-instrumentalist/songwriter James Huggins III. In the group 'of Montreal', Husband recorded and toured as a core member from 1998 to 2010. He left the band after nearly 13 years in June 2010, yet is the only live band member to appear on every release up through 2012's "Daughter of Cloud" and the three previous releases since his departure (after recording on 5 albums between the band's debut "Cherry Peel" & 2005's "Sunlandic Twins" LP). He toured and recorded for well over a decade including performances at the Hollywood Bowl, Roseland Ballroom, The Palladium, and many cities in countries around the globe. James performed on national television in 'of Montreal' on both the "Late Show with David Letterman" & "Late Night with Conan O'Brien" as well as an acting role in the Nickelodeon show Yo Gabba Gabba.

He also recorded a separate Christmas song for Yo Gabba Gabba on the episode "Sick" starring Anthony Bourdain as James Husband. Huggins also performed on a recorded live appearance in Tokyo for NHK national Japanese radio with songwriter Robyn Hitchcock & has performed live with Robyn on several other occasions.

Husband has featured on many albums of his Elephant 6 cohorts, and is a founding member/multi-instrumentalist/songwriter for the band Great Lakes and recorded 3 albums & several 7-inch singles while touring with the group for many years. He was also a touring member of several fellow Elephant 6-associated bands, including The Ladybug Transistor, Elf Power, The Essex Green, Marshmallow Coast, & The Late B.P. Helium. James was a touring member of Azure Ray (2010-2011). From 2012 to 2014, he also recorded and performed live with Elf Power for their release 'Sunlight on the Moon' as well as contributing photographs for the album artwork. Husband has recently been performing with Scott Spillane (Neutral Milk Hotel/Gerbils) in the band E/X/P/. James is working on a new full-length album release including sessions with producer Mitch Easter culled from the remaining 'Stockholm sessions' from 2008 to 2011 mixed with brand new material recorded by members of the new live band featuring BP Helium & Dottie Alexander (of Montreal/Great Lakes). Husband had also recorded with the group Air Sea Dolphin alongside Robert Schneider (Apples in Stereo), the brothers Chaps, and Ryan Sterrit of Homestar Runner fame. The group has released one single on the Chuncklet indie label and has an EP arriving soon. Husband is also performing live currently with Athens, Ga band Summer Hymnns. He is also the co-founder of the ACC (Athens Cowboy Choir) A group of men singing songs from the old west featuring members of Neutral Milk Hotel, of Montreal, the Glands, the Arcs, Elf Power, Fable Factory, and Modern Skirts

== Discography ==
James has released several albums independently recorded and distributed exclusively on CD format.

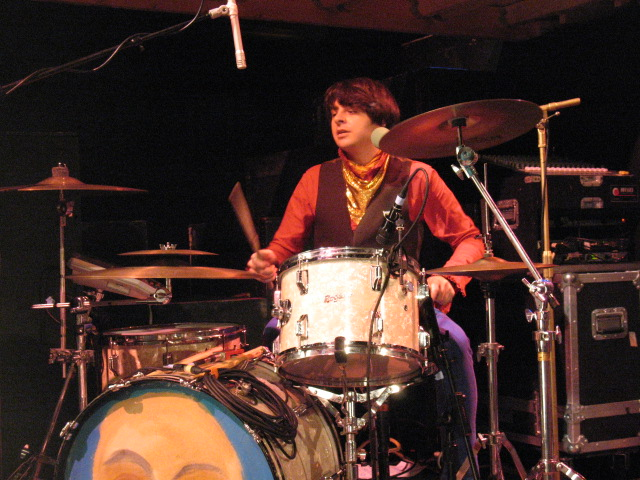
James playing drums for of Montreal in San Francisco, February 2007.

His first album, released in 2005, was entitled Now Listen. It featured twelve original songs; three covers: The Beatles' "We Can Work It Out" and "What You're Doing"; and "Indian Fables" by Guided by Voices. Now Listen was available during Montreal's 2005 tour in support of The Sunlandic Twins.

In 2008, he self-released Turning Tires which also contains a dozen original songs and a couple of covers. As with his previous works, it could only be found at live shows.

A vinyl-only split single with of Montreal was released in March 2009 on the independent, Athens, GA-based Happy Happy Birthday To Me Records. It featured James Husband's "A Grave In The Gravel".

A Parallax I, James' first full-length commercial release, was released on October 27, 2009 on Polyvinyl Record Co to generally favorable reviews. The CD was augmented by a 7-song bonus CD of covers by artists such as Tubeway Army, Buffalo Springfield, Guided By Voices, and The Beatles.

=== Releases ===
- 2005 Now Listen Homemade CD
- 2008 Turning Tires Homemade CD
- 2008 Smothered In Covers Homemade CD
- 2010 A Parallax I + bonus covers EP. released on Polyvinyl Records
- 2009 "A Grave In The Gravel" b/w of Montreal 7" on HHBTM
- 2011 "Sing For Your Meat" GBV tribute album -cover version "Buzzards & Dreadful Crows" NMFL

2017 ASD (Air Sea Dolphin) 7" single EXLODING on Chiunklet Ind

== Live appearances ==
James Husband made a full band debut as a live act by playing three shows in one day at the CMJ Music Marathon in NYC on October 23, 2009. Though, J.H. & Dottie Alexander had performed dozens of shows prior as a two-piece sometimes augmented by other e-6 collaborators.
