= The Late B.P. Helium =

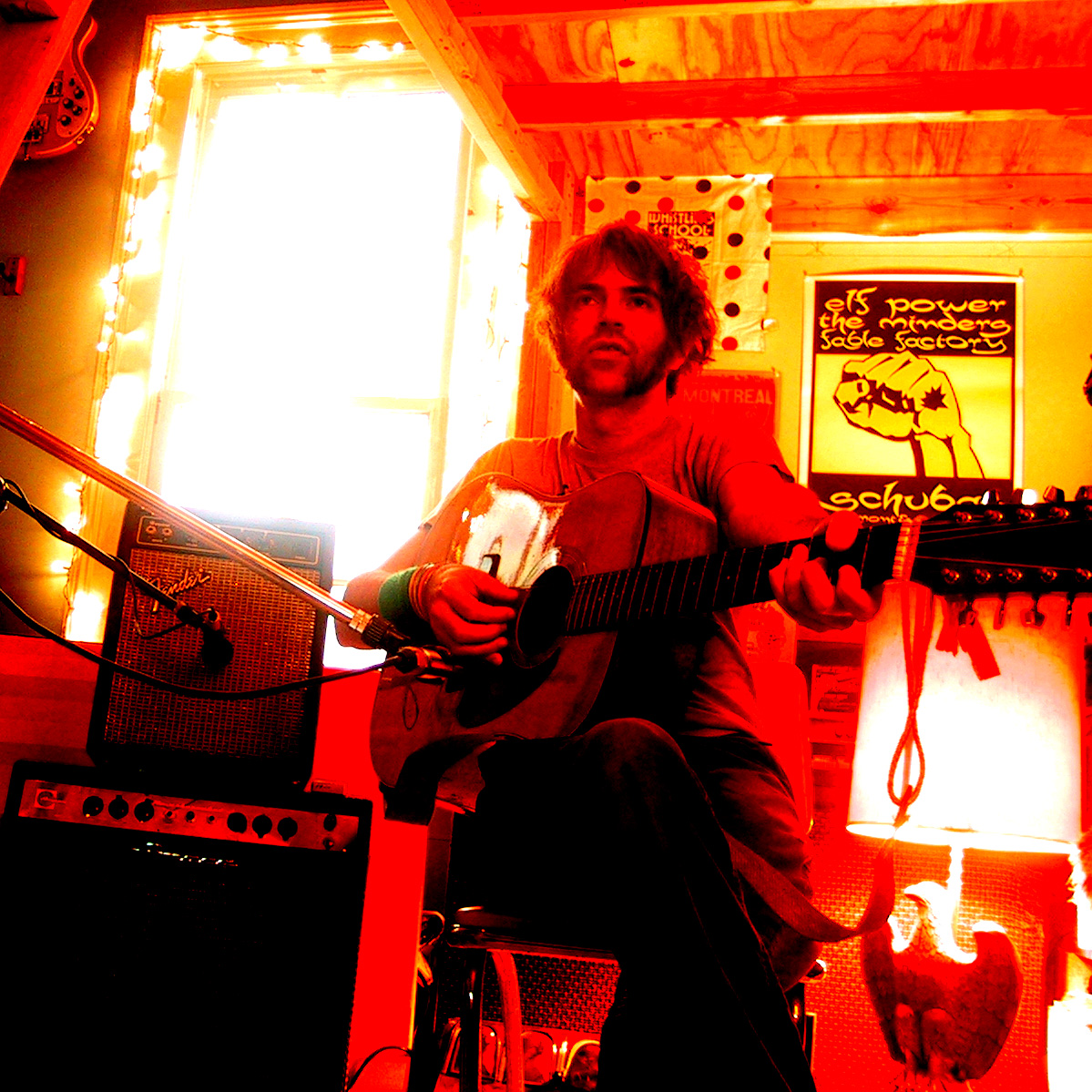
The Late B.P. Helium circa 2006

The Late B.P. Helium is the solo recording project and, at times, stage name of Elephant Six musician Bryan Poole, who also goes by Bryan Helium.

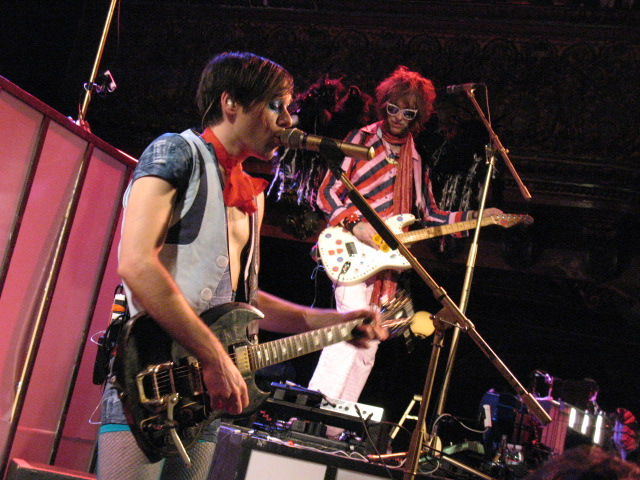
Helium (right) on stage with Of Montreal in San Francisco, 2007.

Poole has spent much of his musical career playing bass and guitar on and off with of Montreal and Elf Power since the mid-1990s. He was also a member of the XTC cover band Helium Kids (a.k.a. The Mummers) from 1994 to 1995. In 2001, he released a few singles and submitted tracks to various compilations before offering his first EP, Kumquat Mae, on his 2002 tour with The Visitations. It was later re-released on Orange Twin Records in 2003, and allowed him to work on his solo debut album, Amok, which was also released on Orange Twin in 2004.

== Discography ==
=== Albums ===
- Amok (CD) – Orange Twin – 2004

=== Singles and EPs ===
- Happy Happy Birthday to Me Singles Club: August (7") – HHBTM – 2001
- Split single with Of Montreal (7") – Jonathan Whiskey – 2001
- Kumquat Mae (CD) – Hype City Records/Orange Twin – 2002
