= Of Montreal =

American indie pop band

of Montreal
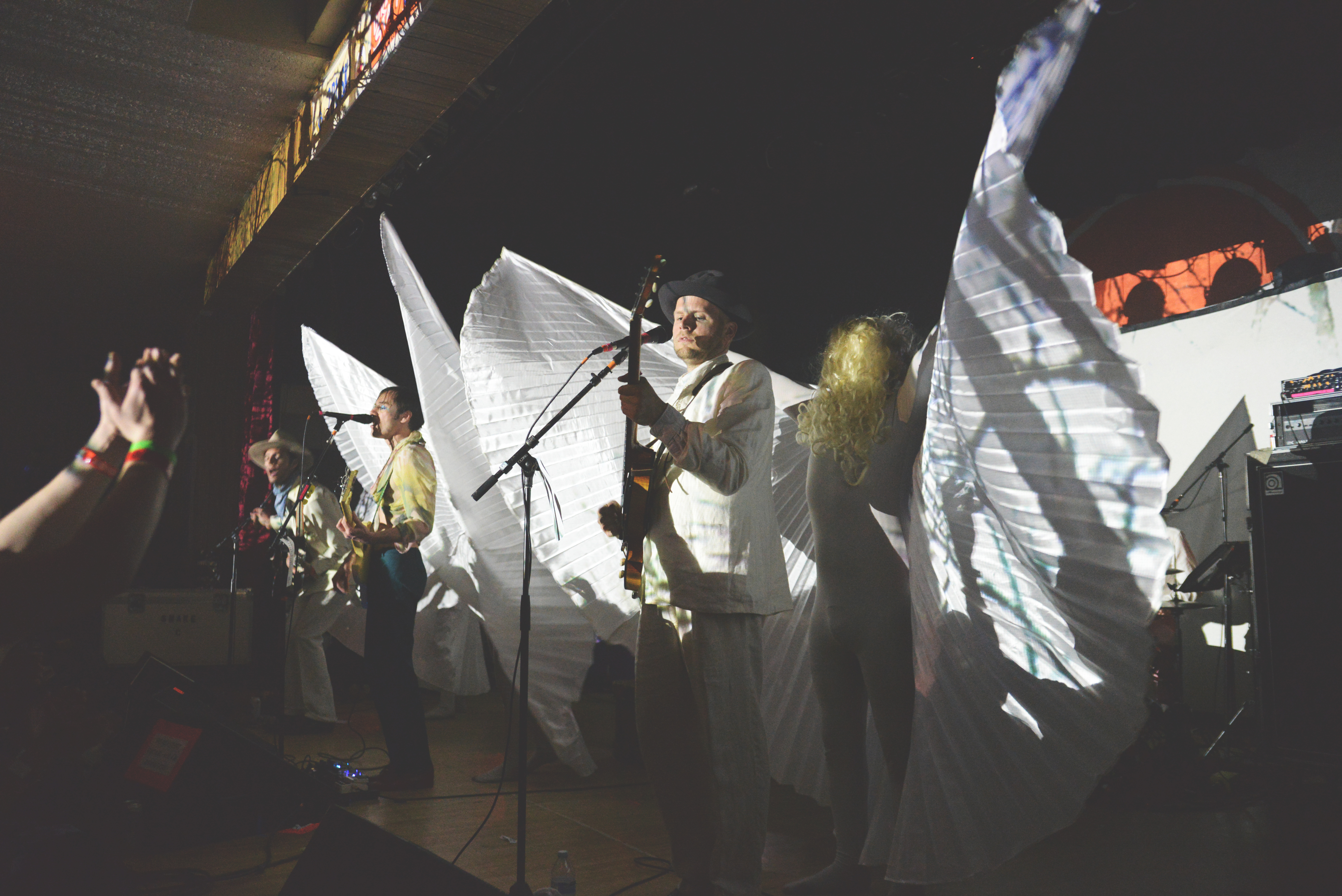
- of Montreal performing in 2015

Background information
- Origin: Athens, Georgia, U.S.
- Genres: Indie pop; psychedelic pop; R&B; progressive pop; electropop; funk
- Years active: 1996–present
- Labels: Polyvinyl; Kindercore; Joyful Noise; Bar/None; Low Transit Industries
- Members: Kevin Barnes; Clayton Rychlik; Jojo Glidewell; Ross Brand; Matthew Danger Lippman
- Past members: Bryan Poole; Derek Almstead; Dottie Alexander; James Huggins; Andy Gonzales; Julian Koster; Jason NeSmith; Nina Grøttland; Matthew Paris Dawson; Ahmed Gallab; Thayer Sarrano; Zac Colwell; Kishi Bashi; Rebecca Cash; Bob Parins; Bennett Dean Lewis; Davey Pierce; Nicolas Dobbratz
- Website: ofmontreal.net

Of Montreal is an American indie pop band from Athens, Georgia. It was founded by frontperson Kevin Barnes in 1996, named after a failed romance between Barnes and a woman "of Montreal". The band is identified as part of the Elephant 6 collective.

Throughout its existence, of Montreal's (Note: It has been established that the band name is conventionally written with a lowercase of by the band and sources referring to it. This article therefore displays the band name with the of both capitalised and not, depending on placement within a sentence.) musical style has evolved considerably and drawn inspiration from 1960s psychedelic pop acts. The band's twentieth album was released in June 2026.

== History ==
=== 1996–1998 ===
Kevin Barnes founded of Montreal, allegedly naming it for a failed romance with a woman from Montreal, Quebec. Barnes was the only member of the group prior to their (Note: As of October 17, 2022, Barnes uses "all pronouns". This article uses they/them pronouns for consistency.) relocation to Athens, Georgia. There, they met Derek Almstead (Circulatory System, Marshmallow Coast, Elf Power) and Bryan Poole, who also performs as The Late B.P. Helium. Together, they recorded their debut album, Cherry Peel, and subsequent releases The Bird Who Ate the Rabbit's Flower and The Bedside Drama: A Petite Tragedy.

After production on The Gay Parade, the band's third album, began in 1998, Poole left the band to focus on his involvement with Elf Power, another Elephant Six band. Barnes then recruited James Husband and Dottie Alexander, who had been performing together as Lightning Bug vs. Firefly. Almstead moved from drums to bass, and Marshmallow Coast's Andy Gonzales joined soon after. Prior to the release of The Gay Parade in 1999, of Montreal released a number of singles and a re-release of The Bird Who Continues to Eat the Rabbit's Flower.

=== 1999–2006 ===
Following the release of The Gay Parade, the band signed with Kindercore Records, and in 2001, the concept album Coquelicot Asleep in the Poppies: A Variety of Whimsical Verse was released.

Kindercore Records folded in 2002, shortly after the release of Aldhils Arboretum, and Gonzales and Almstead left the band. Barnes took to writing and performing their 2004 album Satanic Panic in the Attic mostly by themselves. It was released by Polyvinyl Records. In 2005 The Sunlandic Twins was released.

=== 2007–2012 ===
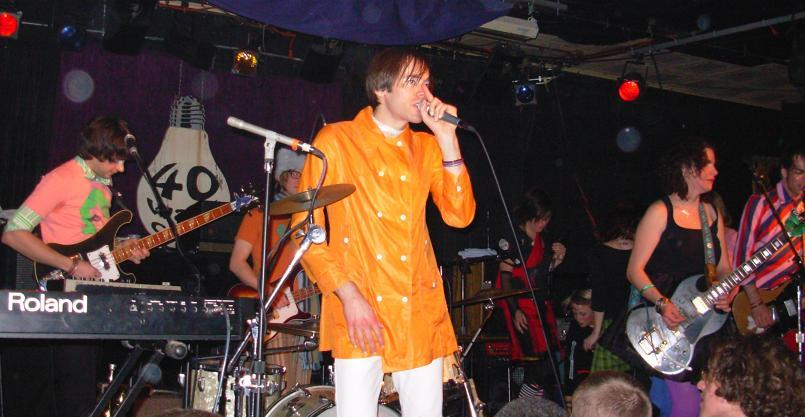
of Montreal performing in Athens, Georgia (2007)

Barnes recorded most of the band's 2007 release, Hissing Fauna, Are You the Destroyer?, by themselves while living in Norway and Athens, Georgia. They also released a companion CD to Hissing Fauna, Are You the Destroyer? called Icons, Abstract Thee. In 2007, Kevin Barnes performed five songs nude during a performance in Las Vegas.

Of Montreal's next album, Skeletal Lamping, was released on October 21, 2008. It was released in ten different formats, including conventional CD and vinyl, as well as T-shirts, button sets, wall decals, tote bags, and a paper lantern, the latter formats complete with a digital download code for the album. All items for the collection were designed by The Bee With Wheels (David Barnes) and Gemini Tactics (Nina Barnes). In an essay addressing the concept behind the album's release, Kevin Barnes stated, "We feel that there's no reason to produce another object that just sits on a shelf. We only want to produce objects that have a function and that can be treasured for their singularness." In an interview with NPR, Kevin Barnes revealed that the concept of the CD may be going the way of the 8-track in favor of MP3 downloads. David Barnes joked that fans would buy the album via MP3 download and the version that comes with an amazing sandwich.

In August 2009, the band contributed a T-shirt design, which was printed and sold through the Yellow Bird Project website to raise money for the St. Judes Children's Hospital. The shirt was designed by David Barnes.

During this era, the band lent its songs many times to commercials, television programs, and films. The song "Wraith Pinned to the Mist (And Other Games)" can be heard on radio and television commercials (with words changed) for an advertisement for Outback Steakhouse. Similarly, their song "Every Day Feels Like Sunday" was used in television commercials for NASDAQ. "A Sentence of Sorts In Kongsvinger" was used in a Comcast commercial. "Gronlandic Edit" was used for a T-Mobile commercial which also featured the band as actors.

Teaming up with Jon Brion, Kevin Barnes traveled to Ocean Way Recording to record False Priest.

On October 25, 2011, of Montreal released a Cassette Box Set of all 10 full-length albums via Joyful Noise Recordings. The release was limited to 500 hand-numbered copies, and housed in a custom-built wooden box (screen-printed with original artwork from David Barnes). Each of the 10 cassettes were pressed on multi-colored tape shells and included original album art. Like their previous cassette release, MP3 download was included.

Kevin Barnes had revealed some information on the following album in an interview with Pitchfork Media. On October 20, 2011, Barnes announced that the next album was complete. In November 2011, the band released a new track titled "Wintered Debts" via the band's SoundCloud site, a track off the new album Paralytic Stalks. In January 2012, of Montreal released "Dour Percentage," the first single from the new album. Paralytic Stalks was released on February 7, 2012.

On November 12, 2012, the band created a Kickstarter page to help in the funding of a career-spanning, feature-length documentary called Song Dynasties. The film consists of footage collected throughout of Montreal's entire career, including touring and studio sessions, as well as other musicians such as Andrew VanWyngarden of MGMT. The tentative release window for Song Dynasties was announced as March 2013. An update regarding the documentary's progress was posted on the band's Facebook site in February. The film was eventually released in June 2014 with the title "The Past Is a Grotesque Animal."

=== 2013–2018 ===
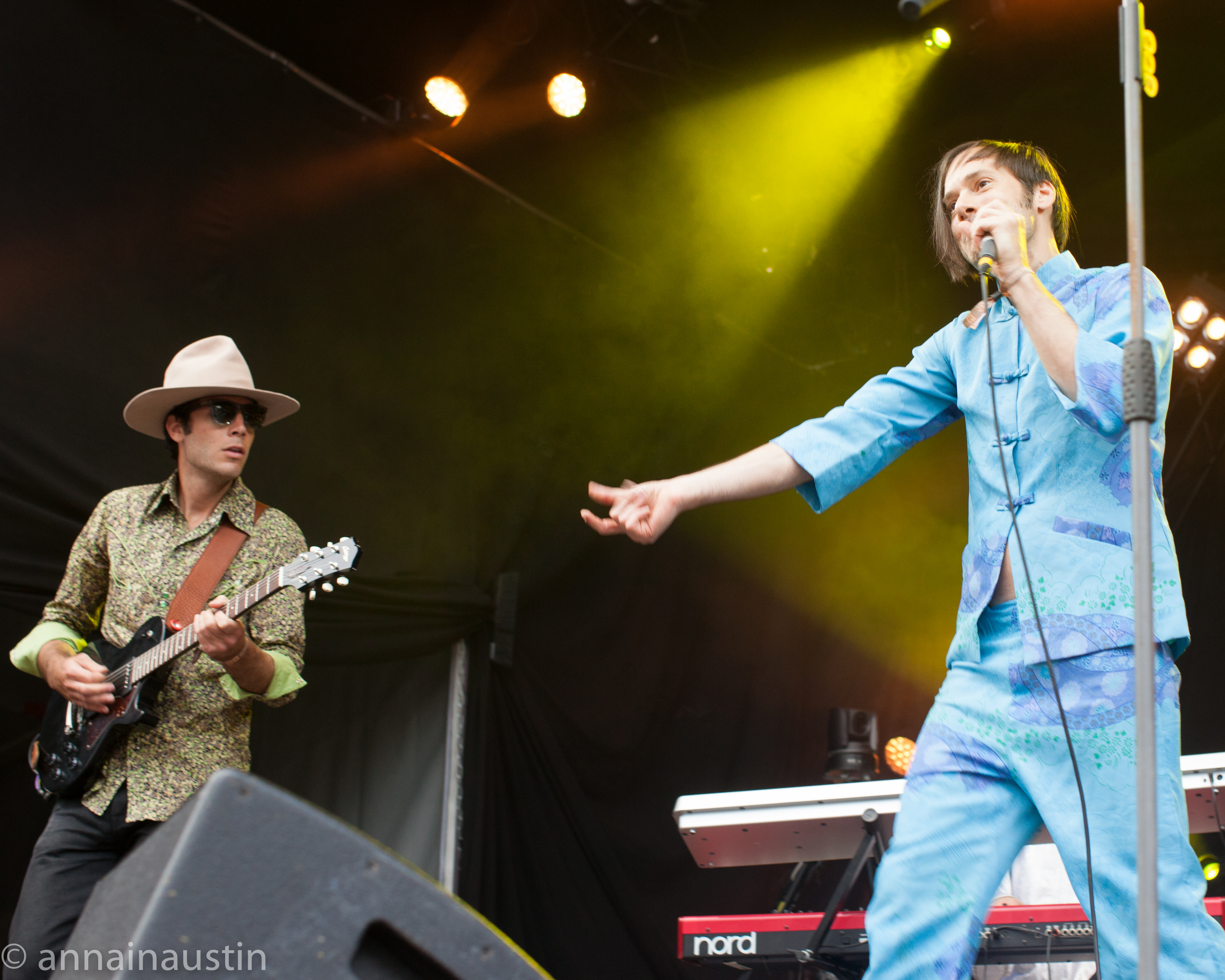
of Montreal performing at the Positivus Music Festival in Riga last 2014

On April 25, 2013, of Montreal posted an announcement on their Facebook page stating that a new album titled Lousy with Sylvianbriar had been completed. The post went into detail about the album's conception, including that Barnes' writing occurred while on a " self imposed isolation experiment in San Francisco" in early 2013. They were influenced by Sylvia Plath, the Grateful Dead, Neil Young, and the Flying Burrito Brothers in their writing. The album was recorded with a new lineup of musicians, including Jojo Glidewell, Nicolas Dobbratz, Bennett Lewis, and Bob Parins, with Clayton Rychlik and Kevin Barnes as the only returning members. The album and subsequent tour also featured Rebecca Cash on vocals. Lousy with Sylvianbriar was released on October 8, 2013. On July 10, 2013, the band released the first single from the album, entitled "Fugitive Air." On July 31, 2013, they announced that they would be touring their new album in October and November. This tour featured the same musicians that performed on the album, instead of longtime band members such as Bryan Poole and Dottie Alexander.

By means of a Facebook post and an interview with Barnes, conducted by Stereogum, of Montreal's album Aureate Gloom was announced. The record was influenced by "the mid-to-late 1970s music scene in New York," including bands such as Talking Heads and Led Zeppelin. The album captures Barnes' emotions borne from their separation from their wife of 11 years and its aftermath. They described the album as being "all over the place musically", lending to its reflection of their mindset during the time of its creation. The album was released March 3, 2015.

In August 2016, of Montreal released Innocence Reaches, which incorporated new, EDM-inspired sounds, as well as the progressive rock sounds of the previous two albums. For the tour following the album's release, bassist Davey Pierce returned to the band, replacing Bob Parins.

On January 13, 2017, of Montreal released a new EP by surprise, entitled Rune Husk. On March 9, 2018, the album White Is Relic/Irrealis Mood was released on Polyvinyl, with singer Barnes explaining that the sound was influenced by "extended dance mixes" from the 1980s.

=== 2019–present ===
The band released its sixteenth studio album, Ur Fun, on January 17, 2020. This was followed by the album, I Feel Safe with You, Trash, on March 5, 2021, and Freewave Lucifer F<ck F^ck F>ck on July 29, 2022.

The band's nineteenth studio album, Lady on the Cusp, was released on May 17, 2024. It was preceded by three singles, "Yung Hearts Bleed Free", "Rude Girl on Rotation", and "Soporific Cell" released March 5, April 16, and May 14, 2024, respectively.

On April 2, 2026, the band released a single titled "When" and announced their twentieth studio album, aethermead, released on June 5 of the same year. On May 5, they released their second single, "Already Dreaming" with a music video directed by Barnes’s daughter, Beatrice. On June 2, the third single for aethermead released, "Take the Form".

== Band members ==
Current

- Kevin Barnes – singer, multi-instrumentalist, songwriter (1996–present)
- Clayton Rychlik – drums (2010–present)
- Jojo Glidewell – keys (2013–present)
- Ross Brand – bass (2022–present)
- Matthew Danger Lippman – guitar, keys (2026–present)

Former

- Bryan Poole – bass (1996–1998); guitar (2004–2013)
- Derek Almstead – drums (1996–1998); bass (1998–2003)
- James Huggins – drums, multi-instrumentalist, keys, bass, guitar, trumpet, vocals, arrangements, songwriting (1997–2011)
- Dottie Alexander – keys (1998–2013)
- Andy Gonzalez – guitar (1998–2003)
- Julian Koster – various (1998–2001)
- Jason NeSmith – guitar (2004–2005)
- Nina Grøttland – bass, visual performer, artist (2004–2012)
- Matthew Paris Dawson – bass (2005–2007)
- Davey Pierce – bass (2007–2013, 2015–2022)
- Ahmed Gallab – drums (2008–2009)
- Nicolas Dobbratz – keys, percussion, bass, guitar (2010–2013, 2015–2022)
- Thayer Sarrano – keys (2010–2012)
- Kaoru Ishibashi – violin, keys (2010–2012)
- Zac Colwell – woodwinds, keys, guitar (2012)
- Rebecca Cash – vocals, keys, bass, percussion (2013–2014)
- Bob Parins – bass (2013–2015)
- Bennett Dean Lewis – keys, guitar (2013–2015)

== Side projects ==
True to the style of most Elephant Six recording artists, of Montreal's members have been in a variety of side projects with other bands:

- Kevin Barnes played keyboard for "The Difference in the Shades" on the Bright Eyes' album Letting Off the Happiness.
- Kevin Barnes, Nina Barnes, and David Barnes did a comedy tour called "A Pollinaire Rave".
- The band performed as the backing band for Marshmallow Coast on record and on tour.
- Dottie Alexander released the song "The You I Created" on the Kindercore singles club, under the pseudonym My First Keyboard; of Montreal acted as her backing band.
- Bryan Poole has a solo career as the Late B.P. Helium.
- Davey Pierce and Travis Adams from the now-defunct emo band My Hotel Year, created the band Inkwell in 2004.
- James Huggins released A Parallax I under the name "James Husband" which featured a cover of The Beatles' "We Can Work It Out".
- Ahmed Gallab has a solo career as Sinkane. He has played in the bands Born Ruffians, Caribou, Yeasayer, and Eleanor Friedberger. He is also the music director and band leader of the Atomic Bomb! Band.
- Derek Almstead has worked with many artists as a musician and engineer including his collaboration with Andy Gonzales M Coast, Elf Power, and Circulatory System.
- The group worked with artist Janelle Monáe on a track called "Make The Bus" in her 2010 LP The ArchAndroid (Suites II and III).
- Kevin co-produced the 2012 Solange Knowles single "Losing You".
- K Ishibashi has a solo career as Kishi Bashi and toured as a supporting act with Sondre Lerche in 2011.
- Kevin Barnes produced and played on the album Marble Mouth by Pillar Point.

== Discography ==
=== Studio albums ===
- Cherry Peel (Bar/None, 1997)
- The Bedside Drama: A Petite Tragedy (Kindercore, 1998)
- The Gay Parade (Bar/None, 1999)
- Coquelicot Asleep in the Poppies: A Variety of Whimsical Verse (Kindercore, 2001)
- Aldhils Arboretum (Kindercore, 2002)
- Satanic Panic in the Attic (Polyvinyl, 2004)
- The Sunlandic Twins (Polyvinyl, 2005)
- Hissing Fauna, Are You the Destroyer? (Polyvinyl, 2007) – No. 72 US
- Skeletal Lamping (Polyvinyl, 2008) – No. 38 US
- False Priest (Polyvinyl, 2010) – No. 34 US
- Paralytic Stalks (Polyvinyl, 2012) – No. 121 US
- Lousy With Sylvianbriar (Polyvinyl, 2013) – No. 115 US
- Aureate Gloom (Polyvinyl, 2015)
- Innocence Reaches (Polyvinyl, 2016)
- White Is Relic/Irrealis Mood (Polyvinyl, 2018)
- Ur Fun (Polyvinyl, 2020)
- I Feel Safe with You, Trash (Sybaritic Peer, 2021)
- Freewave Lucifer F<ck F^ck F>ck (Polyvinyl, 2022)
- Lady on the Cusp (Polyvinyl, 2024)
- aethermead (Polyvinyl, 2026)
