= Kevin Barnes =

American musician

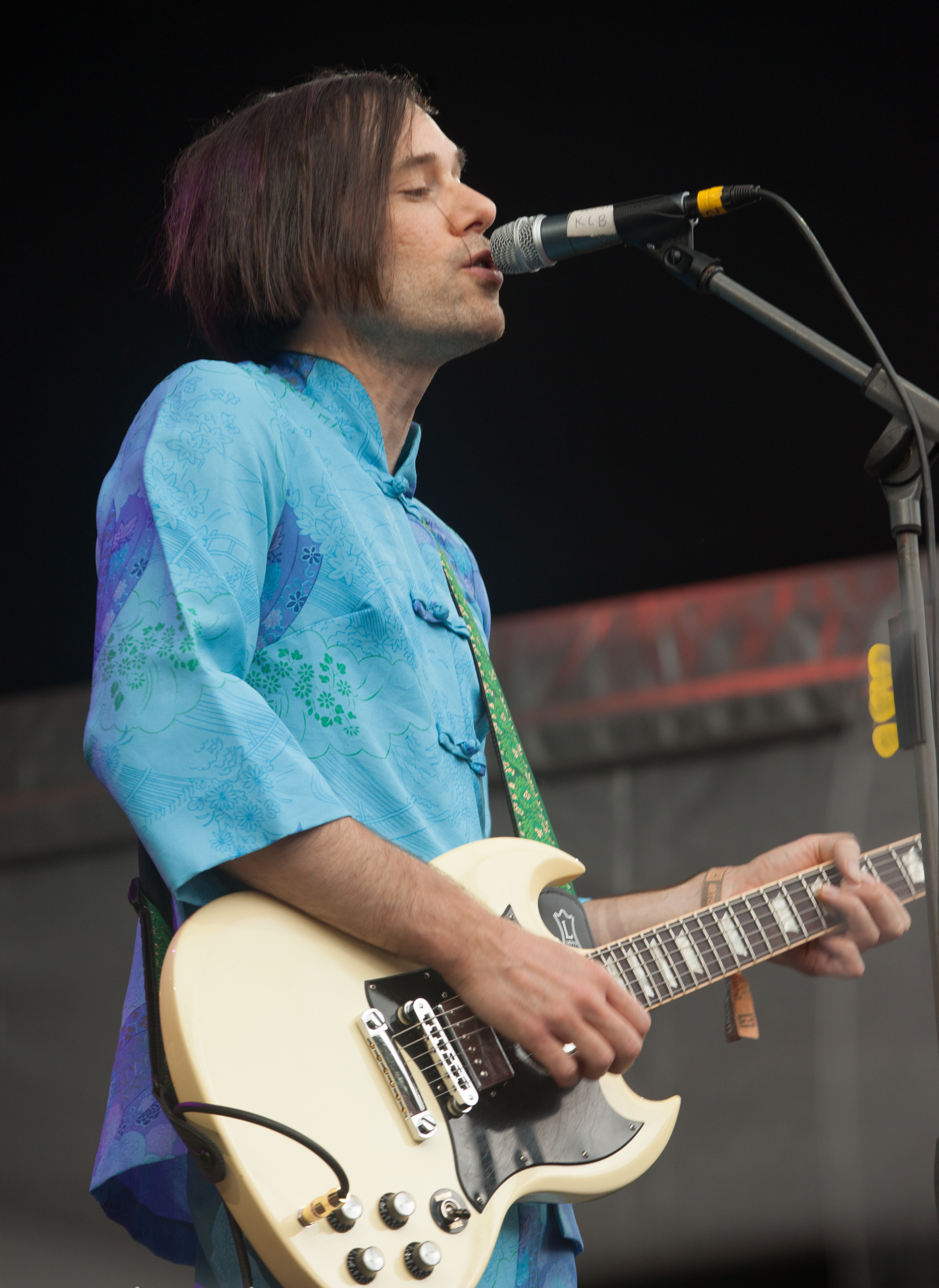
- Barnes at Positivus Music Festival (2014)

Background information
- Born: Kevin Lawrence Barnes; Rocky River, Ohio, U.S.
- Origin: Athens, Georgia, U.S.
- Genres: Indie pop, psychedelic pop, experimental, electronic, funk, R&B
- Occupations: Singer-songwriter, musician
- Instruments: Vocals, synthesizer, guitar, bass guitar, piano, drums
- Labels: Polyvinyl, Kindercore, Bar/None

Kevin Lawrence Barnes is an American musician who is the singer, multi-instrumentalist, and songwriter for the indie rock group of Montreal (Note: It has been established that the band name is conventionally written with a lowercase of by the band and sources referring to it. This article therefore displays the band name with the of both capitalised and not, depending on placement within a sentence.), part of the Elephant 6 Collective. Barnes started the band and, although providing several stories as to the origin of the name, is said to have named it after a failed romance with a woman from Montreal. The group has recorded 20 full-length albums, and numerous EPs and 7" singles. Barnes' brother, David, is an artist and has designed most of the band's artwork for albums since the release of The Gay Parade.

== of Montreal ==
Of Montreal consists of various musicians, with Barnes being the only continuous member. The group has recorded 20 studio albums, beginning with Cherry Peel (1997), and, most recently, aethermead, which was released on June 5, 2026 on Polyvinyl Records. While melodic pop has always been Barnes's primary vehicle, the band's style has transformed significantly since its debut. The acoustic tendencies of early albums gradually transformed into a more electronic, funk, and overall eclectic sound. One of the features which often appears in Barnes's songwriting is upbeat melodies with gloomy, cryptic lyrics and morose subject matter. At different periods in the band's career, Barnes has dealt with subjects both personal and fictional, tending to employ unusual words, phrases, and sophisticated wordplay.

== Lyrical style ==
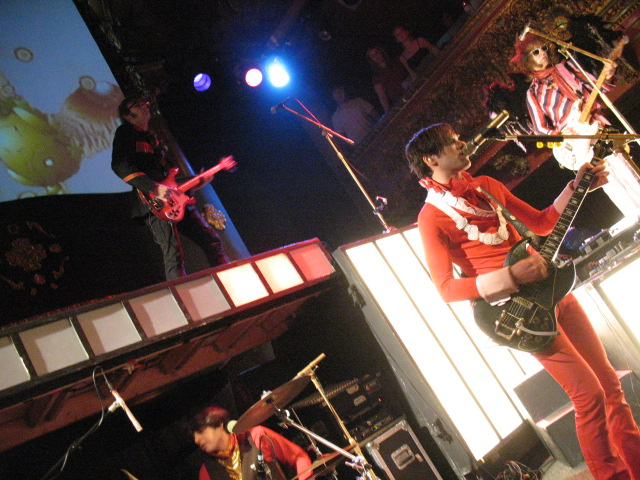
Barnes and bandmates on stage in San Francisco, 2007

Barnes's writing has encompassed many styles over the years. Of Montreal's first album, Cherry Peel, dealt mainly with personal issues of unrequited love, as in the songs "Baby", "Montreal"; or "Tim I Wish You Were Born a Girl". Barnes's style then shifted to storytelling, often involving dialogues as in "Good Morning Mr. Edminton" (from the album Coquelicot Asleep in the Poppies: A Variety of Whimsical Verse), or fictional characters, such as Rose Robert or Jacques Lamure, and even a fictional mythological creature, the Efeblum.

The albums The Gay Parade, The Bedside Drama: A Petite Tragedy, and the aforementioned Coquelicot Asleep in the Poppies are constructed as concept albums.

By 2004, Barnes had started to revert to more personal lyrics, even incorporating the names of familiars and using them as characters, including Barnes's daughter Alabee, in "So Begins Our Alabee" and "Miss Blonde Your Papa Is Failing", and Eva, an acquaintance and resident of Athens, Georgia, in "Bunny Ain't No Kind of Rider".

Barnes has fluctuated between writing personal and fictional lyrics, explaining:

I think if you only write about yourself and your personal life it feels maybe a bit narcissistic, but I think it's inevitable that there will always be some aspect of your personal life or your personal emotions coming through, even if you write about something that would seem like fiction.

Barnes's lyrics, though mostly concerned with dark themes, often portray a certain fondness for:

- French literature, the works of Jean Genet, Guillaume Apollinaire or Georges Bataille in particular.
- Avant-garde cinema. Luis Buñuel's Phantom of Liberty receives a mention in "Lysergic Bliss", Jaromil Jireš' Valerie and Her Week of Wonders in "St. Exquisite Confessions" and Wong Kar-wai in "Rapture Rapes the Muses"
- Greek mythology. "Heimdalsgate Like a Promethean Curse", "Rapture Rapes the Muses" (with references to "antediluvian Troy"), and frequent use of antonomasia (Petrarch and Dido in "So Begins Our Alabee", "Cato as a Pun")

Despite some lyrical references to drugs, Barnes says that recreational drugs or psychedelics do not play a large part in the writing, composing, or recording of his music.

== On stage ==
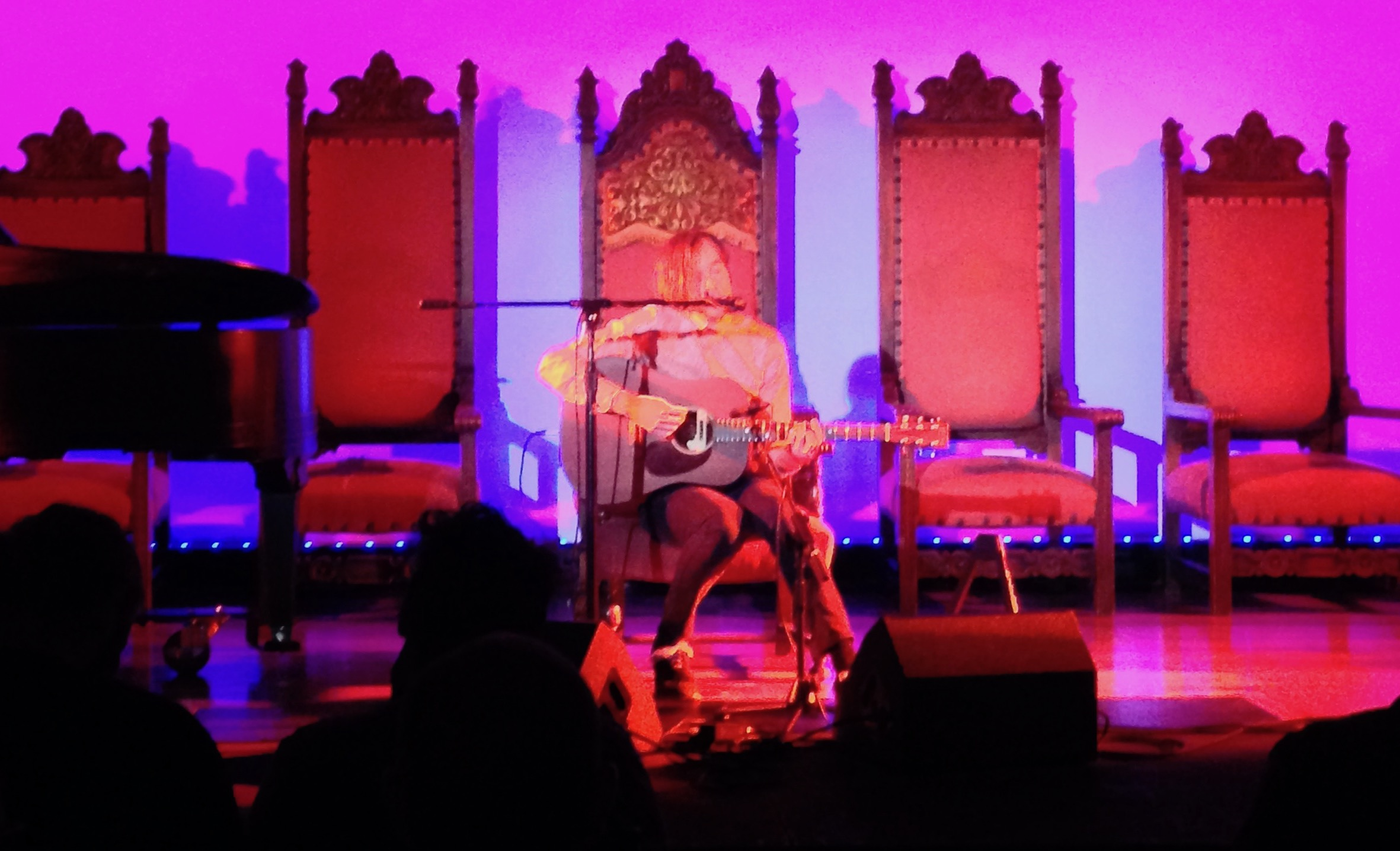
Barnes playing a solo set at the Hollywood Forever Cemetery Masonic lodge in 2014

Barnes consistently combines a love of theater, comedy, and music, often resulting in interludes between songs—skits, slow-motion sword fights and surreal interaction between band members. Barnes performs as many different alter egos or personas, which included a glam rock alter ego, Georgie Fruit, first mentioned in "Labyrinthian Pomp". In 2007, Barnes described Georgie Fruit as a black man in his forties who has undergone multiple sex changes. In 2019, Barnes announced that the persona had been retired, tweeting that "it was an insensitive portrayal of a marginalized group of people that I had no [business] representing."

Barnes has performed in unusual circumstances, such as while astride a white horse, and while completely nude.

== Other projects ==
- A Pollinaire Rave is a comedy tour by Kevin Barnes, David Barnes, and Kevin Barnes's ex-wife, Nina. A CD with the same name was sold, and five of the seven songs on the EP became songs on the Of Montreal album Satanic Panic in the Attic.
- Barnes contributed to Bright Eyes' album Letting Off the Happiness, playing keyboard on "The Difference in the Shades" and performing the background vocals on "A Poetic Retelling of an Unfortunate Seduction".
- Barnes was a member of the teaching faculty at Bennington College in Bennington, Vermont. They taught the Spring 2025 course "Songwriting Crimes and Recording Atrocities."
- Barnes almost entirely wrote and produced "Make the Bus", a song on Janelle Monáe's 2010 album The Archandroid, as well as performing vocals on the track. The song was originally planned to be released on the Of Montreal album False Priest, but Barnes insisted that the song was a much better fit for The Archandroid.
- Barnes performed background vocals for the B-side track on Solange's 2012 single Losing You, "Sleep in the Park".
- Barnes was featured on vocals in the song "Star Power III: What Are We Good For", which was on Foxygen's 2014 album ...And Star Power. Barnes wrote and performed the spoken word part, as well as performed background vocals for the rest of the song.

== Personal life ==
In 2003, Barnes married Nina Aimee Grøttland, a graphic artist and former Ethnobabes member. They separated in December 2013. They have one daughter, born in Oslo in 2004. Barnes then started dating and eventually got engaged to Locate S,1 singer Christina Schnieder before they split in 2026.

In 2020, Barnes came out as bisexual, non-binary, and genderqueer. Barnes' Twitter account lists she/her, he/him, and they/them pronouns.
