= Teenbeat discography =

The following is a list of releases by Teen-Beat. TeenBeat Records was established in 1984.

Each item in the list includes the catalogue number, artist, the release name, the release medium or media.

== 1984–1990 ==
Year	Artist	Title	Type	Catalog number
1984	Unrest	This Side, Numskull	Cassette	TeenBeat J
1985	Clarence	Clarence	Cassette	TeenBeat 5
1985	Thirsty Boys	In A Can	Cassette	TeenBeat 4
1985	Unrest	Lisa Carol Freemont	Cassette	TeenBeat 6
1985	Unrest	Unrest	Cassette, 7"	TeenBeat 2, TeenBeat 7
1985	Various	Extremism In The Defense Of Liberty Is No Vice	Compilation cassette	TeenBeat 1
1985	William & Vivian	William And Vivian	Cassette	TeenBeat 3
1986	Flowers of Discipline	Flowers of Discipline	7"	TeenBeat 9
1987	Synthetic Sox	Synthetic Socks	Cassette	TeenBeat 15
1987	Unrest	Tink of S.E.	LP	TeenBeat 14
1988	Clarence	Hurry Up	Cassette	TeenBeat 25
1988	The Tube Bar	The Tube Bar	Cassette	TeenBeat 22
1988	Unrest	Twister	Cassette	TeenBeat 23
1989	Dustdevils	...Is Big Leggy	7"	38
1989	Johnny Cohen's Love Machine	Johnny Cohen's Love Machine	LP	TeenBeat 39
1989	Mark E.	Sammy Supreme My Man!	7"	TeenBeat 37, TeenBeat 187
1989	Scaley Andrew	The Soul of Postmodernism	Cassette	TeenBeat 30
1989	Unrest	"Catchpellet" (single)	7"	TeenBeat 28
1989	Vomit Launch	Relapsation	7"	TeenBeat 29

== 1991-2000 ==
Year	Artist	Title	Type	Catalog number
1990	Butch Willis	Shopping Bag	7"	TeenBeat 44
1990	Crispy Ambulance	Crispy Ambulance	Cassette	TeenBeat 18
1990	Dustdevils	Struggling Electric and Chemical	LP, cassette, CD	TeenBeat 48
1990	Mark E. Superstar	Mark E. Superstar	Cassette	TeenBeat 57
1990	Scaley Andrew	Meridian Hill Park	Cassette	TeenBeat 40
1990	Scaley Andrew	Raising the Goddess	7"	TeenBeat 33
1990	Sexual Milkshake	Space Gnome and Other Hits	7"	TeenBeat 55
1990	The Tube Bar	The Tube Bar	LP	TeenBeat 31
1990	Unrest and Dustdevils	Live at D.C. Space	Cassette	Teenbeat 41
1990	Vomit Launch	Of	7"	TeenBeat 52
1991	Clarence	-	Three-cassette box set	TeenBeat 45
1991	Eggs	"Skyscraper / Ocelot"	7"	TeenBeat 66
1991	Flying Saucer	Real	7"	TeenBeat 62
1991	Jonny Cohen	Space Butterfly	7"	TeenBeat 69
1991	The Tube Bar	The Tube Bar Deluxe	CD	TeenBeat 81
1991	Unrest	"Yes, She Is My Skinhead Girl" (single)	7"	TeenBeat 42
1991	Unrest	"Cherry Cherry" (single)	7"	TeenBeat 49
1991	Unrest	"A Factory Record" (single)	7"	TeenBeat 63
1992	Bells Of	11:11	CD	TeenBeat 93
1992	Eggs	Bruiser	LP, CD	TeenBeat 76
1992	Grenadine	Goya	LP, cassette, CD	TeenBeat 59/99
1992	Grenadine	"Trilogy" (single)		TeenBeat 88
1992	Jonny Cohen	Indian Giver	7"	TeenBeat 89
1992	Los Marauders	You Make Me Cum in My Pants!	7"	TeenBeat 82
1992	Sexual Milkshake	Sing Along in Hebrew	LP, CD	TeenBeat 75
1992	Unrest	Isabel Bishop	7", 12", CD	TeenBeat 70, BAD 30007, TBT070
1992	Unrest	Imperial f.f.r.r.	LP, cassette, CD	TeenBeat 77, TeenBeat 392 (Deluxe edition, 2005)
1992	Unrest	"Bavarian Mods & Other Hits" (single)	7"	TeenBeat 84
1992	Vomit Launch	Dogeared	Cassette, CD	TeenBeat 85
1993	Barbara Manning	"B4 We Go Under" (single)	7"	TeenBeat 102
1993	Blast Off Country Style	I Love Entertainment	7"	TeenBeat 67
1993	Blast Off Country Style	Pretty Sneaky Sis	7"	TeenBeat 104
1993	Blast Off Country Style	Giggles and Gloom	7"	TeenBeat 114
1993	Eggs	"A Pit With Spikes"	7"	TeenBeat 116
1993	Gastr del Sol	The Serpentine Similar	LP, CD	TeenBeat 95
1993	Grenadine	"Don't Forget the Halo / 777"	7"	TeenBeat 111
1993	In Camera	13 (Lucky for Some)	CD	TeenBeat 106
1993	Jonny Cohen's Love Machine	Getting Our Heads Back Together	CD	TeenBeat 109
1993	Unrest	Fuck Pussy Galore (& All Her Friends)	LP, cassette, CD	TeenBeat 67, OLE 024-1, OLE 024-2
1993	Unrest	Perfect Teeth	CD, cassette	TeenBeat 119, 2-45401, 9 45401-2, 170.3012.20, CAD 3012, TBX 119
1993	Unrest	Cath Carroll	12", CD	TeenBeat 105, BAD 3015
1993	Unrest	So Sick	7"	TeenBeat 98
1993	Unrest	"Where Are All Those Puerto Rican Boys? / Mountain" (single)	7"	TeenBeat 121
1993	Unrest	"Make Out Club" (single)	7"	TeenBeat 126
1993	Various	Teenbeat 50	Compilation CD, LP, cassette	TeenBeat 50, OLE 025-2
1993	Various	Teenbeat 100	Compilation 7"	Teenbeat 100
1994	Air Miami	"Airplane Rider / Stop Sign" (single)	7"	TeenBeat 147
1994	Bells Of	Two Dos Or Not 2?	CD	Teenbeat 143
1994	Blast Off Country Style	"What Gives?" (single)	7"	TeenBeat 124
1994	Blast Off Country Style	C'mon and Blast Off Country Style	LP, CD	TeenBeat 131
1994	Blast Off Country Style	Rainbow Mayonnaise Deluxe	LP, CD	TeenBeat 144
1994	Butch Willis & The Rocks	Repeats	CD	TeenBeats 134
1994	Cath Carroll	"My Cold Heart"	7"	TeenBeat 137
1994	Eggs	Exploder	LP, cassette, CD	TeenBeat 96
1994	Eggs	"Genetic Engineering" (single)	7"	TeenBeat 136
1994	Gastr del Sol	Twenty Songs Less	7"	TeenBeat 125
1994	Grenadine	Christiansen	7"	TeenBeat 166
1994	Grenadine	Nopalitos	LP, CD	TeenBeat 155
1994	Los Marauders	Every Song We Fuckin' Know	LP	TeenBeat 122, TeenBeat 212
1994	Romania	Planes	7"	TeenBeat 150
1994	Tuscadero	"Angel In A Half Shirt / Poster Boy" (single)	7"	TeenBeat 149
1994	Tuscadero	"Mount Pleasant / Nancy Drew"	7"	TeenBeat 139
1994	Tuscadero	The Pink Album	LP, CD, cassette	TeenBeat 159, TB4-159P, 61918-2
1994	Unrest	"Animal Park" (single)	7"	TeenBeat 133
1994	Various	Wakefield. The TeenBeat Story/Vol. 1	CD	TeenBeat 141
1994	Versus	The Stars are Insane	LP, cassette, CD	TeenBeat 142, RAIN 011
1994	Vomit Launch	Not Even Pretty +	CD	TeenBeat 128
1995	Air Miami	Me. Me. Me.	LP, cassette, CD	TeenBeat 177, 9 46000-2, CAD 5011, COCY-78763, 7243 8 41014 2 9, RTD 120.2023.2
1995	Butch Willis & The Rocks	Conquering the Ice	CD	TeenBeat 154
1995	Cath Carroll	"Bad Star" (single)	7"	TeenBeat 157
1995	Cath Carroll	True Crime Motel	LP, CD	TeenBeat 167
1995	Eggs	How Do You Like Your Lobster?	CD	TeenBeat 156
1995	Gamma Ray	"Lovely" (single)	7"	TeenBeat 164
1995	Phil Krauth	Cold Morning	LP, CD	TeenBeat 165
1995	No Trend	The Early Months	CD	TeenBeat 130
1995	Romania	Remodel	CD	TeenBeat 170
1995	Tel Aviv	Tel Aviv	LP, CD	TeenBeat 193
1995	Tel Aviv	Cigarette 45	7"	TeenBeat 183
1995	Tuscadero	The Mark Robinson Re-Mixes EP	7"	TeenBeat 169
1995	Tuscadero	Step into My Wiggle Room	LP, CD	TeenBeat 179
1995	Unrest	B.P.M.	LP, cassette, CD	TeenBeat 175, TB4-175P
1995	Various	Wakefield. Hai Communist Tart/Vol. 2	CD	TeenBeat 151
1995	Various	Wakefield. Superstars on 45/Vol. 3	CD	TeenBeat 161
1995	Various	Wakefield. February 23, 1985/Vol. 4	CD	TeenBeat 171
1995	Various	Wakefield	Four-CD box set	Teenbeat 181
1995	Versus	Dead Leaves	LP, cassette, CD	TeenBeat 162
1995	Versus	"Big Head On" (single)	7"	TeenBeat 152
1995	Viva Satellite	Leonardo	7"	TeenBeat 146
1996	Ascension	Incarnate	7"	TeenBeat 211
1996	Blast Off Country Style	In My Arms	10", CD	TeenBeat 184
1996	Butch Willis & The Rocks	Speedballs	7"	TeenBeat 204
1996	The Feminine Complex	Livin' Love	CD	TeenBeat 196, BMRC-0013, CR Rev 66
1996	The Feminine Complex	Hide & Seek	7"	TeenBeat 216
1996	Gamma Ray	Dynamite	7"	TeenBeat 224
1996	The Gollipopps	Moana	7"	TeenBeat 215
1996	Phil Krauth	Silver Eyes	LP, CD	TeenBeat 205
1996	Olympic Death Squad	Blue	LP, CD	TeenBeat 200
1996	Uncle Wiggly	Jump Back, Baby	LP, CD	TeenBeat 185, 100GM-16
1996	Various	1996 Teenbeat Sampler	Compilation CD	TeenBeat 191
1996	Versus	Deep Red	12", CD	TeenBeat 192
1996	Versus	Secret Swingers	LP, CD	TeenBeat 222
1996	Viva Satellite	Nishma	CD	TeenBeat 186
1997	The Feminine Complex	To Be in Love	CD	TeenBeat 236
1997	Jonny Cohen's Love Machine	If Six Were Eight	8", CD	TeenBeat 229
1997	LUNA	Pup Tent	LP	TeenBeat 232
1997	The Project	Celluloid Dreams of Superman	7"	TeenBeat 226
1997	The Ropers	The World is Fire	LP, CD	TeenBeat 225
1997	Tel Aviv	The Shape of Fiction	CD	TeenBeat 223
1997	True Love Always	When Will You Be Mine?	CD	TeenBeat 239
1997	True Love Always	Mediterranean	7"	TeenBeat 219
1997	Various	1997 Teenbeat Sampler	Compilation CD	TeenBeat 221
1997	Viva Satellite	Extra Eye		TeenBeat 246
1998	Air Miami	World Cup Fever	CD	TeenBeat 257
1998	Andrew Beaujon	A Raw-Boned June	CD	TeenBeat 256
1998	Flin Flon	A-OK	LP, CD, cassette	TeenBeat 252
1998	Flin Flon	"Swift Current" (single)	7"	TeenBeat 241
1998	Phil Krauth	One, Two, Three...	CD	TeenBeat 245, 7 92487 0245-2 3
1998	The Rondelles	Safety in Numbers		TeenBeat 248
1998	True Love Always	Take Me Over	7"	
1998	True Love Always	Hopefully	CD	TeenBeat 269
1998	Tuscadero	My Way or the Highway	LP	TeenBeat 259, PRCD-9994-2
1998	Various	1998 Teenbeat Sampler	Compilation CD	
1998	Versus	Two Cents Plus Tax	LP	TeenBeat 242
1998	Versus	Oriental American / Wallflower	7"	TeenBeat 272
1999	Aden	Black Cow	CD	TeenBeat 266
1999	Bridget Cross, Kathi Wilcox, and Doug Bailey	"Love Will Rule Our Party" (single)	7"	TeenBeat 280
1999	Flin Flon	Boo-Boo	CD, LP	TeenBeat 274
1999	Flin Flon	Black Bear	CD	TeenBeat 263
1999	Hot Pursuit	"Basketball / Hawaii"	7"	TeenBeat 264
1999	Robert Schipul	The American Scene	CD	TeenBeat 261
1999	The Rondelles	The Fox	LP, CD	TeenBeat 278
1999	True Love Always	Buried Treasure	7"	TeenBeat 279
1999	Unrest	Malcolm X Park	LP, cassette, CD	TeenBeat 231
1999	Unrest	Kustom Karnal Blackxploitation	LP, cassette, CD	TeenBeat 238
1999	Various	1999 Teenbeat Sampler	CD	TeenBeat 271

== 2001-2010 ==
Year	Artist	Title	Type	Catalog number
2000	Aden	Hey 19	CD	TeenBeat 286
2000	Bells Of	3's Company	CD	TeenBeat 283
2000	Butch Willis & The Rocks	Superstitious Mummys / Of 2	CD	TeenBeat 284
2000	Hot Pursuit	The Thrill Department	CD	TeenBeat 289
2000	Mark Robinson	Taste	CD	TeenBeat 302
2000	Mark Robinson	Tiger Banana	CD	TeenBeat 307
2000	True Love Always	Windows Fade	7"	TeenBeat 298
2000	True Love Always	Torch	CD	TeenBeat 299
2000	Various	2000 Teenbeat Sampler	CD	TeenBeat 291
2001	Mark Robinson	Canada's Green Highways	LP, CD	TeenBeat 297, PUL003
2001	Tracy Shedd	Blue	CD	TeenBeat 312
2001	True Love Always	Spring Collection	LP, CD	TeenBeat 309
2001	Various	2001 Teenbeat Sampler	Compilation CD	TeenBeat 311
2002	+/-	Self-Titled Long-Playing Debut Album	CD	TeenBeat 323, TeenBeat 403 (DVD)
2002	Aden	Topsiders	CD	TeenBeat 326
2002	Currituck Co.	Unpacking my Library	CD	TeenBeat 336
2002	Flin Flon	Chicoutimi	CD	TeenBeat 285
2002	The Screamers	Greatest Hits	CD	TeenBeat 315
2002	The Pacific Ocean	So Beautiful and Cheap and Warm	CD	TeenBeat 324
2002	Pocket Rockets	Love or Perish	CD	TeenBeat 328
2002	Various	2002 Teenbeat Sample	CD	TeenBeat 331
2003	+/-	You Are Here	CD	TeenBeat 363, TeenBeat 368, TeenBeat 443 (Exstended)
2003	+/-	Holding Patterns	CD	TeenBeat 343
2003	Horse ing Two=Hit	Tilt	CD	TeenBeat 340
2003	Mark Robinson	Origami and Urbanism	LP, CD	TeenBeat 317
2003	The Sisterhood of Convoluted Thinkers	Better Days Coming Now	CD	TeenBeat 356
2003	True Love Always	Clouds	LP, CD	TeenBeat 329
2003	Various	2003 Teenbeat Sampler	CD	TeenBeat 341
2004	+/-	Wicker Park soundtrack ("All I Do")	Compilation CD	LKS 33804
2004	The Fontaine Toups	TFT	CD	TeenBeat 325, TeenBeat 372
2004	hollAnd	I Steal and Do Drugs	DVD, CD	TeenBeat 350, TeenBeat 360
2004	Tracy Shedd	Red	CD	TeenBeat 352
2004	Various	2004 Teenbeat Subscribers' CD (Sound of the Future)	Compilation CD	TeenBeat 359
2004	Various	2004 Teenbeat Sampler	Compilation CD	TeenBeat 361
2005	Phil Krauth	Tight Fit	CD	TeenBeat 325, TeenBeat 385
2005	William and Vivian	Fly to France	CD	No. 3
2005	Various	Teenbeat 20th	Compilation CD	TeenBeat 381
2006	Bossanova	Hey, Sugar	CD	TeenBeat 407
2006	Flin Flon	Dixie	CD, LP	TeenBeat 377, TeenBeat 388
2006	hollAnd	The Paris Hilton Mujahideen	CD	TeenBeat 400
2007	+/- and Bloodthirsty Butchers	+/- vs. Bloodthirsty Butchers	CD	TeenBeat 383
2007	hollAnd	Love Fluxus	CD	TeenBeat 430
2007	Subject to Change	Slouching Toward Somerville	CD	TeenBeat 505
2008	Cotton Candy	A Souvenir Album	CD	TeenBeat 403
2008	Maybe It's Reno	Maybe It's Reno	CD	TeenBeat 434
2008	The Rondelles	In Your Face	CD	TeenBeat 428
2008	The Rondelles	Good Enough for Gravy	CD	TeenBeat 438
2008	Tracy Shedd	Cigarettes & Smoke Machines	LP, CD	TeenBeat 442
2008	Various	Teenbeat No. 1 Record Label	Compilation CD	TeenBeat 411
2009	Cotton Candy	Fantastic & Spectacular	7"	TeenBeat 454
2009	Flin Flon	Et Cetera	CD	TeenBeat 419
2009	Loudest Boom Bah Yea	Booty Beats Fully Realized	LP	TeenBeat 433
2009	Subject to Change	Somerville Speakout	CD	TeenBeat 425, TeenBeat 327, TB410DIGI
2009	Unrest	Newcastle, August 2, 1993	CD	TeenBeat 462
2009	Unrest	Washington, DC, February 25, 2005	CD	TeenBeat 469
2009	Various	Speed Dating	Compilation CD	TeenBeat 436
2010	+/-	Pulled Punches	CD	TeenBeat 483
2010	Bells Of	Young McDonald and the 5 Season Farmers	CD	TeenBeat 493
2010	Cotton Candy	Top-Notch & First-Rate	LP	TeenBeat 457
2010	hollAnd	I Blow Up	CD	TeenBeat 460
2010	Rob Schipul	Cute-Core	CD	TeenBeat 461
2010	Unrest	England, 1992	CD	TeenBeat 476

== 2011-2020 ==
Year	Artist	Title	Type	Catalog number
2011	Bossanova	Blue Bossanova	12"	TeenBeat 456
2011	Fang Wizard	"Fink Beverage" (single)	Cassette	BSK 479-4
2011	Fang Wizard	Pure Hex	LP	TeenBeat 477
2011	Various	The Trouble with Harry	Compilation	11
2012	Cotton Candy	Off-The-Hook & Out-Of-Control		TeenBeat 494
2012	Stick Insect	Circular Scratch		TeenBeat 486
2012	Talk It	Cluck-Cluck	CD	TeenBeat 496
2014	+/-	Jumping the Tracks		TeenBeat 523
2016	Jonny Cohen Love Machine	A Quiet Reminder	CD	TeenBeat 549
2016	Mark Robinson	The BJ Rubin Show soundtrack	MP3 file	TeenBeat 510
2016	True Love Always	Return of the Wild Style Fashionistas	CD	TeenBeat 559
2020	Butch Willis	Amateur On Plastic	DVD	TeenBeat 564

== 2021-present ==
Year	Artist	Title	Type	Catalog number
2021	Fang Wizard	"Shrunken Donuts"	Cassette	TeenBeat 498
2021	Jungle George & the Plague	From Tree to Shining Tree (Greatest Hits)	Cassette	10
2021	Scaley Andrew	You're Safer at Home	Cassette	TeenBeat 60
2021	Scaley Andrew and the Lizards from Hell	Too Tight to Tango	Cassette	TeenBeat 13
2021	Scaley Andrew and the Lizards from Hell	Nervous Twitch	Cassette	TeenBeat 16
2021	Versus	Let's Electrify! (re-issue)	EP	TeenBeat 552
2022	Unrest	West Coast Love Affair	7"	TeenBeat 91
2023	Party Milk	Your Problem as a Mountain	LP	TeenBeat 556
2023	Mark Robinson	KingXMas	Cassette	TeenBeat 27
