= Whysall Lane =

American indie rock band

- Origin: New York City, U.S.
- Genres: Indie rock
- Years active: 1999–2006
- Labels: Devil in the Woods, TeenBeat, Blackball
- Members: Richard Baluyut; Mikel Delgado; Adam Pfahler
- Past members: Lorna Lithgow; Jerry diRienzo; Wyatt Cusick
- Website: http://www.whysall-lane.com/

Whysall Lane was an American indie rock band based in San Francisco whose music combines elements of 1990s indie rock and classic rock with lyrics inspired by romantic obsession. The band's members were Richard Baluyut, Mikel Delgado and Adam Pfahler.

== History ==
Whysall Lane was originally conceived as an acoustic solo side project for Versus singer/guitarist Richard Baluyut to perform Versus songs, original material, the occasional Depeche Mode cover version, and Filipino folk songs. Whysall Lane became Richard's main musical outlet in 2001 after Versus temporarily disbanded.

That year Richard Baluyut relocated to San Francisco from New York City, and Whysall Lane played some live shows with Sooyoung Park playing bass and Richard's brother James Baluyut playing keyboards. Eventually a permanent lineup solidified later that year around Richard Baluyut on vocals and guitar, Mikel Delgado (formerly of The Little Deaths) on bass and vocals, Adam Pfahler (formerly of Jawbreaker) on drums, and Lorna Lithgow on keyboards. The focus of the group changed to electric instrumentation and original material. Lithgow left the band in 2002, and Jerry diRienzo (who also recorded the band's debut album) briefly joined the group as a lead guitarist in 2003.

The band released a version of "During the Mutiny" recorded by Richard and Mikel on a limited edition split single with James' band +/- in early 2002. Recording of the group's debut album started in 2002 but was prolonged owing to band members' family commitments. Apart from work-in-progress versions of some songs streamed on the internet in 2003, the band's only release during the next 3 years was a track on a 2004 TeenBeat compilation. The band's self-titled debut album was finally released on Adam Pfahler's Blackball Records on February 14, 2006. Richard Baluyut's love of classic rock such as Pink Floyd was more in evidence than it had ever been in Versus, leading to the marketing slogan for the debut album of "Indie Rock for people who hate indie rock".

The band's live performances since 2001 had been relatively infrequent and mainly limited to Southern California. Many of their live shows were linked to local Asian-American community events or as a support band to Richard's old friends Yo La Tengo and Mission of Burma.

In March 2007 it was announced on the band's MySpace page and the Blackball Records site that Mikel Delgado had left the band in late 2006, and "the band as you knew it no longer exists".

== Trivia ==
- The band is named after a street in Richard's home town of Detroit.

== Discography ==
- "During the Mutiny" on 7-inch split single with +/- (2002) Devil in the Woods
- "Everything Slows Down" on 2004 TeenBeat Sampler (2004) TeenBeat
- Whysall Lane (2006) Blackball
