= Declaration of Independence (disambiguation) =

A declaration of independence is an assertion of the independence of an aspiring state or states.

Declaration of Independence may also refer to:

- Declaration of Independence (painting), 1817–18 painting by John Trumbull
- Declaration of Independence (film), 1938 American short drama film
- Declaration of Independence (EP), 2011 EP by alternative rock band No Americana
- Declaration of Independence (album), 2012 album by American country rap artist Colt Ford
- "The Declaration of Independence", a song by +/- from Self-Titled Long-Playing Debut Album, 2002

== See also ==
- United States Declaration of Independence
- Mecklenburg Declaration of Independence
- Unilateral declaration of independence
