= Whysall Lane (album) =

Studio album by Whysall Lane
- Released: February 14, 2006
- Recorded: 2002 –2005
- Genre: Indie rock
- Length: 38:45
- Label: Blackball
- Producer: James Baluyut, Richard Baluyut

Professional ratings
Review scores
Source	Rating
The A.V. Club	B−
Under the Radar	7/10 stars

Whysall Lane is the debut album by Whysall Lane. The album was recorded by Jerry diRienzo at Hot Pie studios in California between 2002 and 2005.

The album was recorded using predominantly electric instruments and is reminiscent of lead singer Richard Baluyut's old band Versus. "During the Mutiny" was originally released in a different version on a 2002 split single with +/-. "Theme" dates from 1999, when it was first performed live.

The CD version of the album contains a hidden track "Little Moon" in the pregap of "Not a Fool". "Little Moon" can only be accessed by rewinding past the start of the first track. The running order listed on the CD cover is incorrect, and the track listing below follows the running order of the actual CD.

== Track listing ==
1. "Not a Fool" – 4:06
2. "Half Life" – 4:33
3. "Time Machine" – 5:00
4. "The Way Back" – 3:59
5. "Pillows " – 4:01
6. "Wither Without You" – 5:38
7. "During the Mutiny" – 4:50
8. "Watts" – 6:08
9. "Theme " – 4:35
10. "High Heels " – 5:53

== Personnel ==
- Richard Baluyut – guitar, vocals
- Mikel Delgado – bass, vocals
- Adam Pfahler – drums
- Jerry diRienzo – lead guitar, slide guitar
- James Baluyut – string arrangements, backing vocals
- Ric Quaglia – loops
