= You Are Here (+/- album) =

- Japanese/Taiwanese cover

Studio album by +/-
- Released: November 5, 2003
- Recorded: December 2002 – June 2003
- Studios: Stratosphere Sound and Union Square, New York City
- Genres: Alternative rock, indie rock
- Length: 77:26
- Labels: TeenBeat, White Wabbit, &, BB Island
- Producer: James Baluyut

+/- chronology
Holding Patterns (2003)	You Are Here (2003)	As Seen on Television (2004)

Professional ratings
Review scores
Source	Rating
Pitchfork Media	(7.6/10)
Allmusic (US)	4/5 stars
The A.V. Club	(US)
Splendid E-zine	(positive)
Transform online	(positive)
Paste	(positive)

You Are Here is the second album released by +/-. It was the first full-length release to feature the line-up of James Baluyut, Chris Deaner and Patrick Ramos. It featured a remixed and edited version of Trapped Under ice Floes from the Holding Patterns EP. With its European release in mid-2008 it became the first +/- album to be available in LP format. The tracks "Megalomaniac" and "Summer Dress 1 (All Her Winter Clothes)" appear as background music in the DVD of Roswell Season 3, in episodes 1 and 12 respectively.

== Track listing ==
=== US version ===
1. "Ventriloquist" – 3:15
2. "Surprise!" – 3:45
3. "Trapped Under Ice Floes (Redux)" – 3:27
4. "She's Got Your Eyes" – 4:18
5. "Summer Dress 1 (All Her Winter Clothes)" – 3:01
6. "Cutting Out" – 3:15
7. "Megalomaniac" – 3:49
8. "Scarecrow" – 5:08
9. "No One Sees You Like I Do" – 3:07
10. "Here We Are (Again)" – 4:42
11. "Everything I See Makes It Feel Wrong" – 3:37
- Includes a QuickTime video clip for the EP version of "Trapped Under Ice Floes."
- Contains a hidden track consisting of 33 seconds of electric piano and drum loops. To access the track, find a file on the enhanced content of the CD called "jumble.wav.txt"- if this file is copied to a hard disk and renamed to jumble.wav then it will be playable.

=== Japanese and Taiwanese versions ===
1. "She's Got Your Eyes"
2. "Scarecrow"
3. "Trapped Under Ice Floes (Redux)"
4. "Summer Dress 1 (All Her Winter Clothes)"
5. "Walk in a Straight Line"
6. "Ventriloquist"
7. "Surprise!"
8. "No One Sees You Like I Do"
9. "Megalomaniac"
10. "Here We Are (Again)"
11. "Chromatic"
12. "Everything I See Makes It Feel Wrong"
- Different artwork to the US release.
- Contains a version of Ventriloquist that is 15 seconds longer and has a different mix to that on the US release.
- No video clip.
- Taiwanese release is packaged with the US version of Holding Patterns.

=== European version ===
Disc 1

1. "She's Got Your Eyes"
2. "Scarecrow"
3. "Trapped Under Ice Floes (Redux)"
4. "Summer Dress 1 (All Her Winter Clothes)"
5. "Walk in a Straight Line"
6. "Ventriloquist"
7. "Surprise!"
8. "No One Sees You Like I Do"
9. "Megalomaniac"
10. "Here We Are (Again)"
11. "Chromatic"
12. "Everything I See Makes It Feel Wrong"

Disc 2

1. "I've Been Lost"
2. "Trapped Under Ice Floes"
3. "Far Into The Fields"
4. "You've Just Got It All"
5. "Making The Horse Drink"
6. "Cutting Out"
7. "Waking Up Is Hard To Do"
8. "Back And Forth"
9. "Hellkite"
- Described in catalogues as "You Are Here (extended)"
- Different artwork to previous releases
- Contains all the material recorded during the You are Here sessions
- LP only includes disc 1, CD includes both discs
