= Let's Build a Fire =

- Japanese/Taiwanese cover

Studio album by +/-
- Released: November 26, 2005
- Recorded: February 2005 – May 2006
- Studios: Stratosphere Sound, Union Square, New York City
- Genres: Alternative rock, indie rock
- Labels: Absolutely Kosher, White Wabbit, &
- Producer: James Baluyut

+/- chronology
bloodthirsty butchers vs +/- {PLUS/MINUS} (2005)	Let's Build a Fire (2005)	Self Titled Debut Digital Video Disc (2007)

Professional ratings
Review scores
Source	Rating
AllMusic	4/5 stars
Boston Phoenix	3/5 stars
LAS Magazine	(US)
Pitchfork	(Taiwan)
Pitchfork	(US)
Stylus Magazine	(US)
Transform Online	(US)

Let's Build a Fire is the third album released by +/-. It was first released in Taiwan by White Wabbit Records in November 2005 and in Japan by & Records on December 14, 2005. A revised version of the album was released by Absolutely Kosher Records in the U.S. on October 24, 2006.

The influential American online publication Pitchfork ignited a controversy in November 2006 when it reviewed the Taiwanese version of the album by mistake. The review was critical of elements of the Taiwanese version which had been changed in the subsequent US release. Once the error was drawn to the publishers' attention they quickly commissioned another journalist to review the US version of the album.

The music video for "Steal the Blueprints" was directed by Chris Deaner and won Best Video at the 7th Annual San Diego Asian Film Festival. Deaner also directed a video for the song Fadeout. The song "For You" is used prominently in Episode 19 of Season 5 of CSI: Miami.

== Track listing ==
=== US version ===
1. "Let's Build a Fire" – 3:26
2. "Fadeout" – 5:11
3. "Steal the Blueprints" – 3:05
4. "The Important Thing Is to Love" – 4:14
5. "Thrown into the Fire" – 3:18
6. "Summer Dress 2 (Iodine)" – 3:25
7. "Profession" – 2:44
8. "Ignoring All the Detours" – 4:58
9. "One Day You'll Be There" – 3:51
10. "This Is All (I Have Left)" – 3:27
11. "Leap Year" – 5:18
12. "Time and Space" – 4:41
13. "For You" – 4:31
- Also includes the video clip for "Steal the Blueprints."

=== Japanese version ===
1. "Let's Build a Fire"
2. "Fadeout"
3. "Steal the Blueprints"
4. "The Important Thing Is to Love"
5. "Summer Dress 2 (Iodine)"
6. "Ignoring All the Detours"
7. "Profession"
8. "One Day You'll Be There"
9. "This Is All (I Have Left)"
10. "Leap Year"
11. "Time and Space"
12. "Camouflage Fades into Trust"
13. "Forward March"
14. "Hellkite"
- Also includes the video clip for "Megalomaniac."

=== Taiwanese version ===
1. "Let's Build a Fire"
2. "Fadeout"
3. "Steal the Blueprints"
4. "The Important Thing Is to Love"
5. "Summer Dress 2 (Iodine)"
6. "Ignoring All the Detours"
7. "Leap Year"
8. "One Day You'll Be There"
9. "Hellkite"
10. "Back and Forth"
11. "Time and Space"
12. "Camouflage Fades into Trust"
