= Me. Me. Me. =

Studio album by Air Miami
- Released: 1995
- Recorded: May 1995
- Studio: Criteria
- Genre: Indie rock
- Label: 4AD/Teenbeat
- Producer: Guy Fixsen

Air Miami chronology
Me. Me. Me. (1995)	Fuck You, Tiger EP (1995)

Me. Me. Me. (also stylized as me. me. me.) is the only album by the American indie rock band Air Miami, released in 1995. It was recorded after the breakup of Unrest, the former band of guitarist Mark Robinson and bassist Bridget Cross. The band promoted the album with a North American tour that included shows with Throwing Muses.

== Production ==
Recorded during two weeks in May 1995 at Criteria Studios, in Miami, the album was produced by Guy Fixsen; Gabriel Stout played drums. It was the band's intention to produce an album of short songs. "Afternoon Train" is a re-recording of the final Unrest single.

== Critical reception ==
Professional ratings
Review scores
Source	Rating
AllMusic	4.5/5 stars
The Austin Chronicle	3/5 stars
The Encyclopedia of Popular Music	3/5 stars
MusicHound Rock: The Essential Album Guide	3/5 stars
The Philadelphia Inquirer	3.5/4 stars
Press & Sun-Bulletin	A
Spin	8/10
The Tampa Tribune	4/4 stars

Me. Me. Me. was met with generally favourable reviews. The Washington Post wrote that Robinson and Cross "trade lead vocals on 13 short songs that combine bubblegum tunefulness ('Neely'), with lounge-ballad melancholy ('Seabird'), evanescent soundscapes ('Reprise') and occasional space-rock bleeps." Trouser Press thought that "the bubblegum aftertaste left by segments of Me. Me. Me. is a bit too strong when Robinson indulges his propensity for creating inconsequential chantalongs like 'World Cup Fever', but he offsets that with reams of bracing, Fire Engines-styled guitar and a guileless new wave sensibility (see 'Dolphin Expressway') that should sway all but the most diehard Anglophobe." The Austin Chronicle deemed the album "a heady mix of danceable trivialities and serious longing." The Tampa Tribune concluded that "Air Miami soars through a universe of pop styles with a surfeit of panache and a minimum of bombast... Pure pleasure—clean, clever, surprising."

Spin called Robinson "one of the few men in indieland who can hold a vocal melody," and wrote that "the guitar work here is as nimble as Dean Wareham's." The Post and Courier determined that "Robinson's avant pop/punk songs are fun, and serve as great set-ups for Cross' more oblique offerings." The St. Louis Post-Dispatch labeled the album "alternately fun and pretentious, like most 4AD stuff," writing that "faced with the choice of copping either atmospheric Velvets-style arrangements or Wire-esque sprinters, Air Miami did the all-American thing and riffed off both."

AllMusic wrote that, "unsurprisingly, early drum machines provide percussion as well, a sonic signifier that also fits nicely more often than not ... Me, Me, Me is a simpler musical pleasure than most." MusicHound Rock: The Essential Album Guide opined that Me. Me. Me. "doesn't have the giddiness of the Unrest work, but it is sweet to listen to."

== Legacy ==
Time Out considered the album cover to be one of the 40 best of the 1990s. "Seabird" was covered by Maria Somerville for the 2021 4AD compilation Bills & Aches & Blues.

== Track listing ==
No.	Title	Length
1.	"I Hate Milk"
2.	"World Cup Fever"
3.	"Seabird"
4.	"Special Angel"
5.	"Afternoon Train"
6.	"Dolphin Expressway"
7.	"Sweet as a Candy Bar"
8.	"You Sweet Little Heartbreaker"
9.	"Neely"
10.	"Bubble Shield"
11.	"The Event Horizon"
12.	"Definitely Beachy"
13.	"Reprise"
