= What Lies Beneath (disambiguation) =

What Lies Beneath is a 2000 American supernatural horror-thriller film.

What Lies Beneath may also refer to:

== Music ==
- What Lies Beneath (Robin Trower album), 2009
- What Lies Beneath (Tarja album), 2010
- "What Lies Beneath", a song by Breaking Benjamin from Dear Agony, 2009

== Television ==
=== Series ===
- What Lies Beneath (TV series), a Philippine mystery series

=== Episodes ===
- "What Lies Beneath" (According to Jim), 2007
- "What Lies Beneath" (All Saints), 2007
- "What Lies Beneath" (Black-ish), 2017
- "What Lies Beneath" (Casualty), 2016
- "What Lies Beneath" (Di-Gata Defenders), 2007
- "What Lies Beneath" (Durham County), 2007
- "What Lies Beneath" (The Gates), 2010
- "What Lies Beneath" (Generator Rex), 2010
- "What Lies Beneath" (Holby City), 2007
- "What Lies Beneath" (The Loud House), 2024
- "What Lies Beneath" (McLeod's Daughters), 2006
- "What Lies Beneath" (Miami Medical), 2010
- "What Lies Beneath" (My Little Pony: Friendship Is Magic), 2018
- "What Lies Beneath" (Painkiller Jane), 2007
- "What Lies Beneath" (Quatermass), 1979
- "What Lies Beneath" (Sea Patrol), 2007
- "What Lies Beneath" (Superman & Lois), 2022
- "What Lies Beneath" (The Vampire Diaries), 2014
- "What Lies Beneath" (Yu-Gi-Oh! GX), 2007
- "What Lies Beneath", an episode of Tracker

== See also ==
- What Lies Below (disambiguation)
- What Lies Ahead (disambiguation)
