= Secret Swingers =

Studio album by Versus
- Released: 1996
- Genre: Indie rock
- Label: TeenBeat/Caroline
- Producer: Nicolas Vernhes

Versus chronology
Deep Red (1996)	Secret Swingers (1996)	Two Cents Plus Tax (1998)

Secret Swingers is the second studio album by the American band Versus, released in 1996. The band supported the album by participating in the Caroline All-Stars Fall Tour.

== Recording and production ==
The band added a second guitar player, James Baluyut, prior to the Secret Swingers recordings sessions. The album was produced by Nicolas Vernhes, and was recorded over a month and a half. The album title and many of the songs allude to double lives and secretive relationships. "Angels Rush In" incorporates counterpoint vocals.

== Critical reception ==
Professional ratings
Review scores
Source	Rating
AllMusic	4/5 stars
Chicago Sun-Times	3/4 stars
The Encyclopedia of Popular Music	4/5 stars
MusicHound Rock: The Essential Album Guide	3.5/5 stars

The Nashville Banner called the album "derivative of Sonic Youth," but wrote that "Versus still manages to bring its fair share of ideas to the table." The Village Voice deemed it "as 'original' as guitar-bass-drums-vocals indie-rock music gets," declaring that "with equal boy and girl intensity, and ecstatic, near-schizophrenic tempo/volume changes, Versus have forged that rare commodity: a 'sound'." The Sunday Times praised Fontaine Toups, writing that she "supplies the kind of motorised bass parts New Order's Peter Hook wouldn't have been ashamed of." The Day noted Versus' "odd guitar tunings, bittersweet vocal harmonies and paranoid lyrics."

AllMusic called the album "a superbly textured set more consistent and eclectic than anything else the band has done to date." Magnet wrote that "Secret Swingers may not have been revolutionary, but like a good inside joke between friends, it stuck around." Reviewing the band's 2010 album, On the Ones and Threes, Pitchfork thought that Versus' two Caroline releases "sound as close as most any other records to a definitive indie rock sound."

== Track listing ==
No.	Title	Length
1.	"Lose That Dress"
2.	"Yeah You"
3.	"Glitter of Love"
4.	"Ghost Story"
5.	"Use as Directed"
6.	"Double Suicide (Mercy Killing)"
7.	"Jealous"
8.	"Shower Song"
9.	"Angels Rush In"
10.	"One Million"
11.	"A Heart Is a Diamond"
