= What Lies Ahead (disambiguation) =

"What Lies Ahead" is the second-season premiere episode of The Walking Dead.

What Lies Ahead also may refer to:

- "What Lies Ahead", a song by +/- from Jumping the Tracks, 2014
- "What Lies Ahead", a song by Kensington from Time, 2019
- "What Lies Ahead" (song), a song by Peter Gabriel from O\I, 2026.
- What Lies Ahead (film), a thriller film starring Rumer Willis

== See also ==
- What Lies Beneath (disambiguation)
