= Bernard Wilson (American football) =

American football player (born 1970)

No. 96, 94
- Position: Defensive tackle

Personal information
- Born: August 17, 1970 (age 56); Nashville, Tennessee, U.S.
- Listed height: 6 ft 3 in (1.91 m)
- Listed weight: 303 lb (137 kg)

Career information
- High school: Maplewood (Nashville)
- College: Tennessee State
- NFL draft: 1992: undrafted

Career history
- Detroit Lions (1992–1993)*; Tampa Bay Buccaneers (1993–1994); Arizona Cardinals (1994–1998)
- * Offseason or practice squad member only

Career NFL statistics
- Tackles: 213
- Sacks: 4
- Interceptions: 1
- Stats at Pro Football Reference

Raphael Bernard Wilson (born August 17, 1970) is an American former professional football player who was a defensive tackle in the National Football League (NFL). He was signed by the Detroit Lions as an undrafted free agent in 1992. He played college football for the Tennessee State Tigers.

Wilson attended Maplewood High School. Wilson also played for the Tampa Bay Buccaneers and Arizona Cardinals, and left the NFL in 1998. He married Roslyn Marie O'Neal in 1994.
