= My Way or the Highway (Tuscadero album) =

Studio album by Tuscadero
- Released: 1998
- Genre: Indie rock
- Label: Teen Beat/Elektra
- Producer: Keith Cleversley

Tuscadero chronology
Step into My Wiggle Room EP (1995)	My Way or the Highway (1998)

My Way or the Highway is an album by the American indie rock band Tuscadero, released in 1998. The first single was "Paper Dolls". The band supported the album with a North American tour.

== Production ==
The album was produced by Keith Cleversley. Tuscadero devoted more time to constructing the songs, while also attempting to avoid creating an overly slick record. Guitar players Melissa Farris and Margaret McCartney employed fuzz tones on the album and also made use of technically inferior, "trashy" sound equipment. "Tickled Pink" is about binge drinking.

== Critical reception ==
Professional ratings
Review scores
Source	Rating
AllMusic	4/5 stars
Robert Christgau	(1-star Honorable Mention)
Entertainment Weekly	B+
Knoxville News Sentinel	4/5 stars
San Francisco Examiner	2/4 stars

The Washington Post thought that "the band's appeal does get lost in the ornate production of a few of these tracks, notably the over-orchestrated 'Dr. Doom' and the anti-super model 'Paper Dolls', which rides its funky sax sound to the six-minute mark." Robert Christgau praised the "songcraft as end-in-itself." Newsday noted that the album "abandons some of the kitsch of its previous effort for stern, often angry lyrics."

Tulsa World called the album "fun, gritty pop," noting Farris's "reverence for the Pretenders/Blondie ethos." Entertainment Weekly opined that "sonic departures like the slinky antifashion anthem 'Paper Dolls' and the flamboyantly James Bondish 'Dr. Doom' neatly transcend alt-guitar-rock limitations." The Dayton Daily News wrote: "Meaty hooks and solid crunch back up songs that mostly pick on campus rock-band preptiles who overindulge in, um, passably clever pop-cultural strip mining."

AllMusic wrote that the "heady concoction of fizzy pop hooks, teen melodrama, slamming punk, and misfit glee makes My Way or the Highway an intoxicating punk-pop rush."

== Track listing ==
No.	Title	Length
1.	"Queen for a Day"
2.	"Paper Dolls"
3.	"Freak Magnet"
4.	"Not My Johnny"
5.	"Hot Head"
6.	"Tiny Shiny Boyfriend"
7.	"Dr. Doom"
8.	"Tickled Pink"
9.	"Evil Eye"
10.	"You Got Your Pride"
11.	"Cathy Ray"
12.	"Liquid Center"
13.	"Temper Temper"
14.	"Mutiny"
