= Self-Titled Long-Playing Debut Album =

First album by +/-

- First edition silver cover

Studio album by +/-
- Released: February 5, 2002
- Recorded: 2001
- Studio: Beverley Manor and Union Square, New York City
- Genre: Alternative rock, indie rock
- Length: 39:01
- Label: TeenBeat
- Producer: James Baluyut

+/- chronology
Self-Titled Long-Playing Debut Album (2002)	Holding Patterns (2003)

Professional ratings
Review scores
Source	Rating
Allmusic (US)	4/5 stars
Pitchfork Media	(8.4/10)
CMJ New Music Monthly	(positive)

Self-Titled Long-Playing Debut Album is the debut studio album by American band +/-, released on February 5, 2002, by TeenBeat Records. It was written, performed and recorded almost entirely by former Versus guitarist James Baluyut, with his Versus bandmate Patrick Ramos playing additional drums on the album. Baluyut used the recording of the album to experiment with techniques such as 5-4 time and sampling. Upon release, the album was acclaimed for its fusion of indie rock song structures with electronica production techniques, and it was compared favourably to works by The Microphones and The Notwist. The track "All I Do" was later featured in the soundtrack for the film Wicker Park.

== Track listing ==
1. "All I Do" – 2:34
2. "Crestfallen" – 2:37
3. "The Queen of Detroit" – 3:52
4. "Beverley Road" – 3:26
5. "Manifest Destiny (In General)" – 1:27
6. "The Declaration of Independence" – 3:10
7. "Setting Your Head on Fire" – 2:56
8. "The Industrial Revolution" – 3:38
9. "Yo Yo Yo (Please Don't Fall in Love)" – 2:46
10. "I Sleep Forever" – 3:45
11. "All I Have to Do Is Make You" – 2:18
12. "Ill Advised" – 2:47
13. "The Separation of Church and State" – 3:45
- Includes a Flash video clip for "A Million Pieces on the Ground."
