= Currituck Co. =

Indie folk band

- Origin: Washington, D.C.
- Genre: Indie folk
- Years active: 2000–present
- Labels: TeenBeat Records, The Track & Field Organisation, Lexicon Devil, Troubleman Unlimited
- Members: Kevin Barker, Otto Hauser
- Past members: Terrence J. Black, Eddie Carlson, Jeremy Challender, Joe Dolce, Matt Everett, Mark Greenberg, Fern Knight, Bree Van Reyk, Margie Wienk, Christopher M. Sienko, Ruth E. Welte
- Website: www.teenbeatrecords.com/artists/currituckco.html

Currituck Co. (short for Currituck County) is an indie folk project started in 2000 by Kevin Barker, who is also the former lead guitarist for Aden. Originally formed in Washington, D.C., Barker moved to New York City the following year, taking the project with him.

== Studio album discography ==
- Long Playing Record Album (Death Rattle Of The West, 2000)
- Unpacking My Library (TeenBeat, 2002)
- Ghost Man on First (Lexicon Devil/Track & Field, 2003/2004)
- Sleepwalks in the Garden of the Deadroom (Track & Field, 2005)
- Ghost Man on Second (Troubleman Unlimited, 2005)
