= Funky Little Demons =

Studio album by the Wolfgang Press
- Released: 1995
- Length: 47:51
- Label: 4AD
- Producer: Drostan Madden

The Wolfgang Press chronology
Queer (1991)	Funky Little Demons (1995)	Everything Is Beautiful (A Retrospective 1983-1995) (2001)

Funky Little Demons is the fifth studio album by the English band the Wolfgang Press, released in 1995.

The album peaked at No. 75 on the UK Albums Chart. The first single was "Going South". The band supported the album by touring North America with Suddenly, Tammy!

== Production ==
The album was produced by Drostan Madden. It was recorded in the band's own studio, although founding member Mark Cox was often not present for sessions.

The band split the album between songs that were written in a standard verse-chorus manner, and those that were built out of musical soundscapes. "11 Years" is an autobiographical song; "New Glass" is an instrumental track.

== Critical reception ==
Professional ratings
Review scores
Source	Rating
AllMusic	3/5 stars
Calgary Herald	B−
The Encyclopedia of Popular Music	3/5 stars
Knoxville News Sentinel	4/5 stars
MusicHound Rock: The Essential Album Guide	3/5 stars
The Record	2.5/4 stars
The Tampa Tribune	1.5/4 stars

Trouser Press wrote: "No longer enigmatic risk-takers, the Wolfgang Press have become just another white post-new wave soul band." The Guardian thought that the album "contains enough elements from pop's more melodic spectrum to lift them squarely out of their old art-terrorism mode." The Calgary Herald deemed it "funky without tryin'," likening it to "Joy Division goes uptown."

The Irish Times determined that Funky Little Demons "sees the Wolfies change from dark, brooding neo industrialists to bright, ironic soul popsters." The Ottawa Citizen stated that "Going South" "is positively contagious, resonating with gravelly lead vocals, piercing slide work and soul-touching background singers." The New York Times noted that Wolfgang Press "has been letting its pop float to the surface of its dirges, ending up with a stylized soul music that sounds like a chunkier version of Roxy Music." Joyce Jones, of The Washington Post, listed the album among the 10 best of 1995, writing that Allen "exudes a cantankerous charm, coming off like Nick Cave on Soul Train."

AllMusic wrote that "the album is neither particularly funky nor at all demonic, and in these tamer surroundings, Michael Allen's formerly compelling baritone murmur sounds kind of mannered and pretentious."

== Track listing ==
No.	Title	Length
1.	"Going South"
2.	"11 Years"
3.	"Blood Satisfaction"
4.	"Chains"
5.	"Christianity"
6.	"Derek the Confessor"
7.	"So Long Dead"
8.	"Executioner"
9.	"She's So Soft"
10.	"New Glass"
11.	"Fallen Not Broken"
12.	"People Say"
