= True Love Always =

American pop band

- Origin: Charlottesville, Virginia, U.S.
- Genres: Indie rock, pop rock
- Years active: 1995–2002 (hiatus) • 2007
- Label: TeenBeat Records
- Members: Matt Datesman; John Lindaman; Tony Zanella
- Past members: Tobin Rodriguez; Fred Kovey; Jeff Grosfeld

True Love Always is an American pop band formed in Charlottesville, Virginia in 1995, with a mission to play only love songs. The band was influenced by João Gilberto, Dionne Warwick, and Earth, Wind & Fire. The band has been associated with TeenBeat Records.

== History ==
Original members Matt Datesman (drums), John Lindaman (guitar and vocals) and Tobin Rodriguez (bass and vocals) began experimenting with softer sounding music after the breakup of Charlottesville rock band Operation:Love!, which featured Lindaman and Datesman. Soon after their first show, in November 1995, they opened for TeenBeat Records act Versus at the Tokyo Rose in Charlottesville. A TeenBeat Records executive was in attendance, and was impressed by their two song cassette featuring the song "Mediterranean". He asked them to record Mediterranean as a single for TeenBeat, beginning their long association with the label.

After several albums, singles and a few tours, Rodriguez left the band in 1999. After a few tours of the United States and Japan with substitute bassists including Jeff Grosfeld and Fred Kovey, bassist Tony Zanella joined in 2000, touring, recording some singles and the album, Clouds. Shortly after recording Clouds in 2002, the band went on an indefinite hiatus as Lindaman moved to New York, Datesman became a father, and Zanella completed his Master of Philosophy. In 2007, the band began working on new material, but at a much slower pace than their former methods allowed. Datesman continues to record and perform occasionally with Flin Flon; Zanella continues to tour with +/-. Lindaman performs regularly with a number of groups in New York City, including Latin Hustle, The Solitary Cyclist, and The Instruments, as well as recording experimental instrumental improvisations under his own name.

== Recordings ==
=== Singles ===
- "Mediterranean", 1996
- "Take Me Over", 1997
- "Secret Scenes", 1998 (Motorway label, Japan)
- "Buried Treasure", 1999
- "Windows Fade", 2000 (promotional Japan tour 7", co-released with Rover Records)

=== Albums ===
- When Will You Be Mine?, 1997
- Hopefully, 1998
- Torch, 2000
- Spring Collection, 2001
- Clouds, 2003
- Very Important Love Songs, 2006 (Thai label Smallroom career retrospective)
- Return of the Wild Style Fashionists, 2016

=== Compilation albums ===
TeenBeat compilations from 1997 to the present

- All's Fair in Love and Chickfactor
