= E. J. Junior =

American football player and coach (born 1959)

No. 54, 53, 50, 93
- Position: Linebacker

Personal information
- Born: December 8, 1959 (age 66); Salisbury, Maryland, U.S.
- Listed height: 6 ft 3 in (1.91 m)
- Listed weight: 235 lb (107 kg)

Career information
- High school: Maplewood Comprehensive (Nashville, Tennessee)
- College: Alabama (1977–1980)
- NFL draft: 1981: 1st round, 5th overall pick

Career history

Playing
- St. Louis / Phoenix Cardinals (1981–1988); Miami Dolphins (1989–1991); Tampa Bay Buccaneers (1992); Seattle Seahawks (1992–1993)

Coaching
- Seattle Seahawks (1994) Linebackers coach; Miami Dolphins (1996–1998) Director of player development; Minnesota Vikings (2003) Minority intern coach; Jacksonville Jaguars (2005) Minority intern coach; Rhein Fire (2005) Assistant coach; Southwest Baptist (2006–2008) Linebackers coach; Central State (OH) (2009–2013) Head coach; Delaware State (2015–2017) Defensive line coach

Awards and highlights
- As a player: First-team All-Pro (1984); 2× Pro Bowl (1984, 1985); 2× National champion (1978, 1979); Unanimous All-American (1980); Second-team All-American (1979); SEC Lineman of the Year (1980); 3× First-team All-SEC (1978, 1979, 1980)

Career NFL statistics
- Sacks: 36.5
- Interceptions: 12
- Interception yards: 186
- Fumble recoveries: 7
- Defensive touchdowns: 1
- Stats at Pro Football Reference

Head coaching record
- Career: 9–45 (.167)
- College Football Hall of Fame

Ester James Junior III (born December 8, 1959) is an American former football player and coach. He played as a linebacker in the National Football League (NFL) for 13 seasons, from 1981 to 1993, with the St. Louis / Phoenix Cardinals, the Miami Dolphins, the Tampa Bay Buccaneers, and the Seattle Seahawks. Junior played college football for the Alabama Crimson Tide, where he played as a defensive end and earned consensus selection to the 1980 College Football All-America Team. He was selected by the Cardinals in the first round with the fifth overall pick of the 1981 NFL draft. Junior served as the head football coach at Central State University from 2009 to 2013. He was inducted into the College Football Hall of Fame as a player in 2020.

== Early years and family ==
Junior was born in Salisbury, Maryland and grew up in Nashville, Tennessee. He and his wife, Yolanda, have eight children: Shandon Hood, Torren Hood, Ashley James, Adam J. Junior, Aja J Junior, E.J. Junior IV, Kyle E. Junior, and Cameron M. Junior.

== Playing career ==
=== College ===
Junior attended the University of Alabama, where he played for coach Bear Bryant's Alabama Crimson Tide football team from 1977 to 1980, wearing jersey number 39. In the 1979 opener against Georgia Tech, he returned an interception 59 yards for a touchdown. He finished the season with 5 sacks, 52 tackles, and a blocked punt. As a senior in 1980, he produced 71 tackles and blocked a field goal. He was recognized as a consensus first-team All-American.

Junior was a member of Kappa Alpha Psi fraternity at Alabama.

=== Professional ===
The St. Louis Cardinals chose Junior in the first round (fifth pick overall) of the 1981 NFL Draft, and he played for them from 1981 to 1988. In 1983, he was suspended four games for cocaine use. He was a two-time Pro Bowl selection for the Cardinals in 1984 and 1985. He subsequently played for the Miami Dolphins, Tampa Bay Buccaneers and Seattle Seahawks.

== Coaching career ==
Since leaving the NFL, Junior has been the executive director of youth programs in Miami under the NBA's Alonzo Mourning. He also spent time back in the NFL as a coach and in the front office. He was the Seattle Seahawks linebacker coach in 1994 and then was the director of player development programs for the Miami Dolphins from 1996 to 1998. He has been a minority intern coach for the Minnesota Vikings (2003) and Jacksonville Jaguars (2005) and coached in NFL Europe for the Rhein Fire in Düsseldorf, Germany. On the college setting, he coached the linebackers at the East–West Shrine Bowl in 2005 and 200 .

From 2006 to 2009, Junior was the linebackers coach at Southwest Baptist University in Bolivar, Missouri. He was promoted to defensive coordinator in February 2009, but left a month later to become head coach at Central State University in Wilberforce, Ohio. From 2015 to 2017, he was the defensive line coach at Delaware State University.

== Honors ==
In May 2012, he was inducted into the Alabama Sports Hall of Fame and into the Tennessee Hall of Fame 2010. He made the Senior Bowl Hall of Fame in 2007. Junior was nominated for the College Football Hall of Fame in 2016 but fell short in votes. He was again nominated in June 2017. On March 11, 2020, the College Football Hall of Fame announced the Junior as a member of the 2020 class of inductees.

== Head coaching record ==
Year	Team	Overall	Conference	Standing	Bowl/playoffs
Central State Marauders (Great Lakes Football Conference) (2009)
2009	Central State	1–10	1–2	4th	
Central State Marauders (NCAA Division II independent) (2010–2011)
2010	Central State	1–10			
2011	Central State	1–10			
Central State Marauders (Great Lakes Valley Conference) (2012)
2012	Central State	4–7	4–4	5th	
Central State Marauders (Southern Intercollegiate Athletic Conference) (2013)
2013	Central State	2–8	2–3	T–3rd (West)	
Central State:		9–45	7–9		
Total:		9–45			
