= Rob Christiansen =

American musician and recording engineer

Rob Christiansen is an American musician and recording engineer, who played in the 1990s indie pop band Eggs and the Grenadine 'supergroup', and plays in the band Sisterhood of Convoluted Thinkers and The Shot Heard 'Round the World. In 2006, he produced the Shot Heard 'Round the World's Ten Songs for Town & Country record.
