= Bird Wood Cage =

Studio album by the Wolfgang Press
- Released: 1988
- Studio: The Townhouse, Blackwing
- Label: 4AD
- Producer: Flood, the Wolfgang Press

The Wolfgang Press chronology
Standing Up Straight (1986)	Bird Wood Cage (1988)	Queer (1991)

Bird Wood Cage is the third studio album by the English band the Wolfgang Press, released in 1988 by 4AD.

== Critical reception ==
The Washington Post wrote: "Like New Order ... the group adopts the big-beat conventions of American dance music only to drain them of soulfulness." The Chicago Tribune stated that "the members of Wolfgang have perfected their own smart mix of the edgy energy and irreverent wit of alternative music and the rhythmic richness of funk and reggae." Trouser Press determined that "the band's thickly laid atmosphere envelops all sorts of effective ingredients: female backing vocals on 'King of Soul', wah-wah guitar on 'Kansas', dub reggae effects on 'Hang on Me (For Papa)'."

== Track list ==
1. "King of Soul" 4:02
2. "Raintime" 4:39
3. "Bottom Drawer" 4:42
4. "Kansas" 3:53
5. "Swing Like a Baby" 4:06
6. "See My Wife" 3:55
7. "The Holey Man" 4:16
8. "Hang on Me (For Papa)" 5:08
9. "Shut That Door" 5:40

=== From the "Big Sex" EP ===
1. "The Wedding" 3:51
2. "The Great Leveller" 4:31
3. "That Heat" 4:23
4. "God's Number" 4:39
