= Gerard Cosloy =

American music industry executive

Gerard Cosloy (born 1964) is an American music industry executive.

== Biography ==
Cosloy was raised in Wayland, Massachusetts, a western suburb of Boston. While he was in high school, he became involved in the local hardcore punk scene, put together many punk shows, and started Conflict, a mimeographed fanzine of underground and alternative rock and art. He continued to write and edit the fanzine during the '80s and early '90s. He never finished college though he did briefly attend the University of Massachusetts, Amherst, where he contributed reviews to "Daily Collegian," the college newspaper.

In 1984, Cosloy got a job at Homestead Records an independent label created by the Dutch East India Trading Co., a Long Island-based record distributor. He moved to New York for the position. Homestead put out many of the mid-80s defining alt-rock records, from Big Black, Sonic Youth, Dinosaur Jr., My Dad Is Dead, The Membranes and many others. He continued to publish Conflict during this time.

It was via Conflict that Cosloy first heard the band Pavement, after Scott Kannberg sent the fanzine the band's first studio recording, Slay Tracks. He did some DJing at WZBC, Boston College's radio station, as well. He had a record label called Conflict Records, which issued a compilation LP called Bands that Could be God. He also put out a 7-inch single by the Boston band The Flies. Cosloy also promoted shows in the Boston area, one of them being hardcore band Deep Wound, which evolved into Dinosaur Jr.

Cosloy next worked with Matador Records. The label was started in 1989 by Dutch East employee Chris Lombardi, and Cosloy joined the partnership in 1990.

For a time Cosloy lived in London working with Matador's UK and US operations. As of Autumn 2004, he has been living in Austin, Texas, continuing his partnership with Lombardi.

He has also started the experimental record label Parallelism and the label 12XU.

Cosloy is also a musician and is a member of Air Traffic Controllers and briefly worked with punk singer GG Allin. From 1992-1996, he fronted the New York quartet Envelope, while briefly filling in as bassist for the Dustdevils during Mark Ibold's tenure in Pavement.

Cosloy has a daily mostly-sports blog called Can't Stop the Bleeding.

Cosloy's house was destroyed by fire in August 2009. Cosloy, who worked out of his home, and another resident were awakened and evacuated around 3 a.m. by an officer of the Austin Police Department. Cosloy was quoted as saying, "There are a lot of people who have a lot less than I do, who deal with a lot worse, but this is pretty bad."
