= The Burden of Mules =

Studio album by the Wolfgang Press
- Released: 1 August 1983
- Recorded: May 1982 – June 1983
- Genre: Post-punk
- Label: 4AD
- Producer: Mark Cox, Michael Allen

The Wolfgang Press chronology
| The Burden of Mules (1983) | Standing Up Straight (1986) |

The Burden of Mules is the debut studio album by English post-punk band the Wolfgang Press. It was released on 1 August 1983, through record label 4AD.

== Track listing ==
Side A
| No. | Title | Writer(s) | Length |
|---|---|---|---|
| 1. | "Lisa (The Passion)" | Andrew Gray, Mark Cox, Michael Allen | 3:01 |
| 2. | "Prostitute I" | Cox, Allen | 3:01 |
| 3. | "The Burden of Mules" | Gray, Cox, Allen | 3:43 |
| 4. | "Complete and Utter" | Cox, Allen | 3:40 |
| 5. | "Prostitute II" | Cox, Allen | 3:26 |
| 6. | "Slow as a Child" | Cox, Allen | 6:36 |

Side B
| No. | Title | Writer(s) | Length |
|---|---|---|---|
| 1. | "Journalists" | Gray, David Steiner, Cox, Allen | 3:32 |
| 2. | "Give It Back" | Cox, Allen | 6:04 |
| 3. | "On the Hill" | Cox, Allen | 10:59 |

== Critical reception ==
Professional ratings
Review scores
| Source | Rating |
|---|---|
| AllMusic | 2/5 stars |
| Treble | favorable |

AllMusic's review was negative, calling the album "impenetrable" and some tracks "so morose and vehement as to verge on self-parody". Trouser Press called it "dark and cacophonous; an angry, intense slab of post-punk gloom that is best left to its own (de)vices."

Ernest Simpson of Treble was more positive, stating, "As the times changed, so did their [Wolfgang Press'] sound, but The Burden of Mules still stands as not only the beginnings of a great band, but as a definition of a specific time and place in music history. They trod the dark side of post-punk with a gloom and doom shared by many of their contemporaries, but it is their penchant for theatrics that makes this album stand out."

== Personnel ==
The Wolfgang Press

- Andrew Gray – guitar (tracks A1, A4 and B2), percussion (tracks A1 and B2), drums (tracks A3 and B1), sleeve photography
- David Steiner – drums (track B1)
- Michael Allen – drums (tracks A1 and B1), percussion (tracks A1, A2, A4–A6 and B2), bass guitar (tracks A2–A6, B2 and B3), vocals (tracks A2–A5 and B1–B3), synthesizer (tracks A2 and A5), piano (tracks A6, B2 and B3), organ (track A6), drum loops (track B2), cymbal and saxophone (track B3), production
- Mark Cox – synthesizer (tracks A2 and A4–B3), percussion (tracks A1, A2, A4–A6), clarinet (tracks A2, A5 and B3), "noises" (tracks A3, B1 and B2), pixiephone and chimes (tracks A2 and A4), piano (tracks A2 and A5), organ (tracks A1 and B1), "scratches" and whistling (track A6), bass guitar (track A3), production
- Richard Thomas – drums (tracks A2, A4–A6 and B3), flute and piano (track B3)

Technical

- John Madden – engineering, production
