= Bossanova (band) =

Canadian musical group

- Origin: Vancouver, British Columbia, Canada
- Genres: Soul music, Disco, Pop music, New wave music, folk, and psychedelia
- Years active: 1995-2011
- Labels: Teen Beat Records
- Members: Chris Storrow; Michael Boegh; Tony Koelwyn; Greg Macdonald; Kurt Dahle; Shawn Mrazek; Megan Bradfield; Elaine Fung; Heather Campbell; Brian Weiser; Chris Walters; Josh Wells; Mike Coulthard

Bossanova was a Canadian musical group from Vancouver. The eclectic band blended soul, disco, pop, new wave, folk, and psychedelia.

== History ==
Bossanova formed in 1997 in Vancouver. Original members were guitarist/vocalist Chris Storrow, bassist Michael Boegh, drummer Tony Koelwyn and Greg Macdonald on organ and synthesizer. The band started out playing in local clubs and bars, showcasing songs written by Storrow.

Bossanova released the 7" Bossanova, then inch, and then an EP, I Give You...Bossanova, in 1997. They signed with TeenBeat Records, through which they later contributed to several compilations, including the album Amateurs on Plastic in 2000.

Bossanova released the album Hey, Sugar in 2006. The album received some airplay on campus and community radio.

In 2010, the band travelled to Washington, DC to take part in a show organized by TeenBeat Records. Storrow then moved to Montreal and began a solo career.

== Discography ==
- Bossanova (1996, Cassette), Independent
- I Give You...Bossanova (1997, EP), Independent
- Hey Sugar (CD, 2006), Teen Beat

Compilation appearances

- Teenbeat Sampler (1999)
- Amateurs On Plastic (2000)
- Good Jacket Presents: Vancouver Special (2000)
- ShoopDeDoop (2001)
- Teenbeat Sampler (2003)
- Teenbeat Sampler (2004)
- Teenbeat Sampler (2008)
