= James Stone (American football) =

American football player (born 1992)

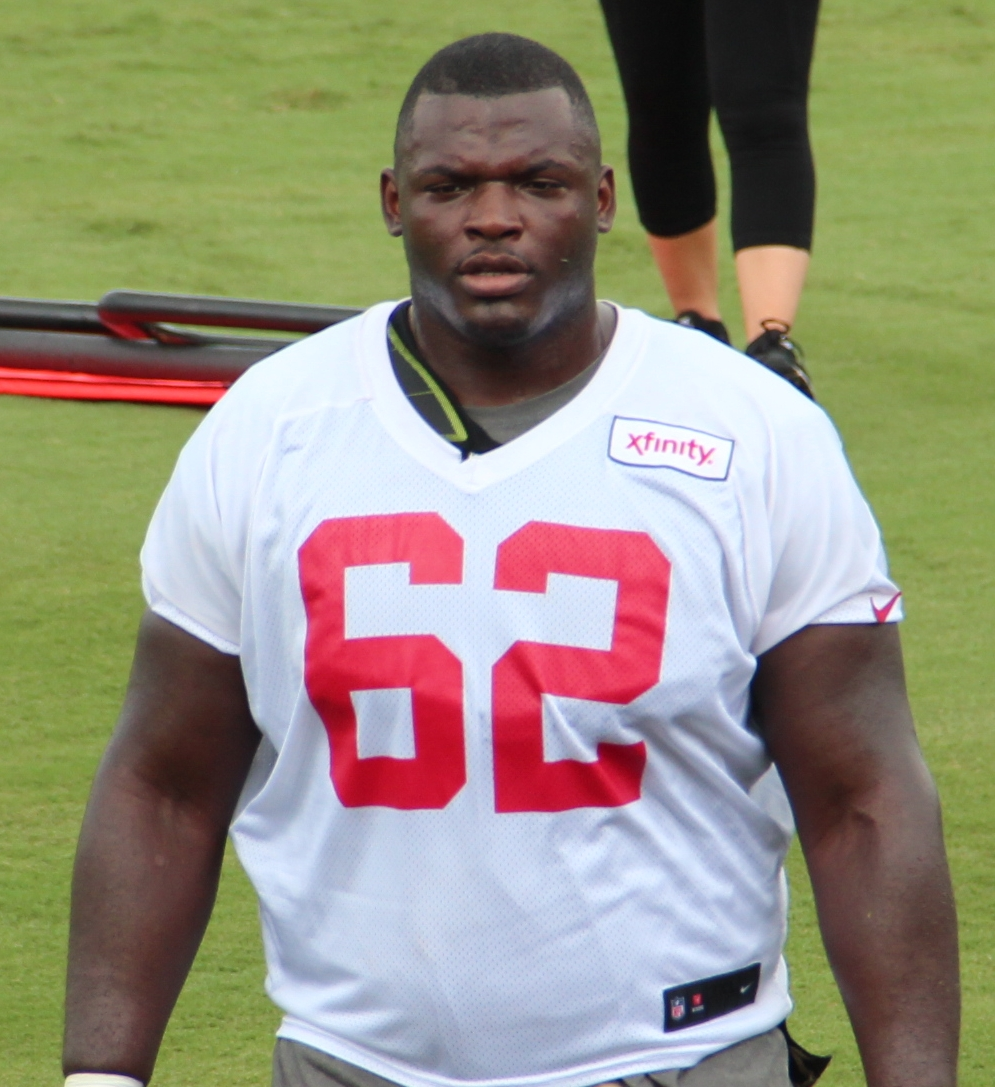
- Stone with the Atlanta Falcons in 2015

No. 62
- Position: Center

Personal information
- Born: April 26, 1992 (age 34); Nashville, Tennessee, U.S.
- Listed height: 6 ft 3 in (1.91 m)
- Listed weight: 291 lb (132 kg)

Career information
- High school: Maplewood (Nashville)
- College: Tennessee
- NFL draft: 2014: undrafted

Career history
- Atlanta Falcons (2014–2015); Tampa Bay Buccaneers (2017)*; Oakland Raiders (2017); Chicago Bears (2018)*
- * Offseason or practice squad member only

Career NFL statistics
- Games played: 21
- Games started: 10
- Stats at Pro Football Reference

James Robert Stone (born April 26, 1992) is an American former professional football player who was a center in the National Football League (NFL) for the Atlanta Falcons and Oakland Raiders. He played college football for the Tennessee Volunteers.

== Early life ==
Stone played high school football for the Maplewood High School in Nashville, Tennessee. He was the Tennessee AA Lineman of the Year and named to the Tennessee Sports Writers All-State first-team. He competed in the 2010 Under Armour All-America Game.

== College career ==
Stone played from 2010 to 2013 for the Tennessee Volunteers under head coaches Derek Dooley and Butch Jones.

== Professional career ==
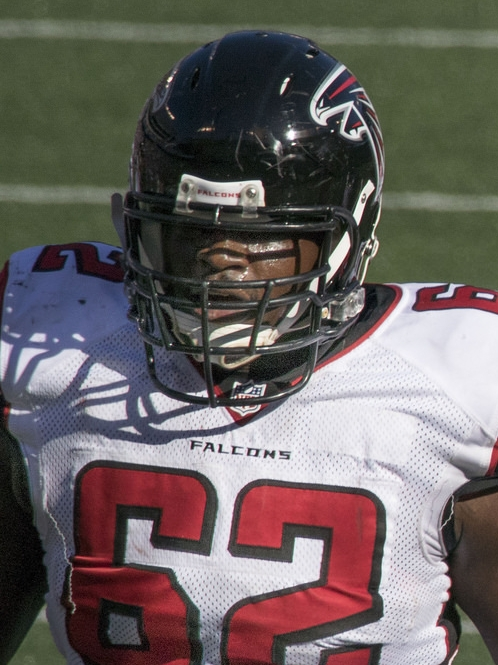
Stone with the Falcons in 2014

=== Pre-draft ===
Pre-draft measurables
Height	Weight	40-yard dash	10-yard split	20-yard split	20-yard shuttle	Three-cone drill	Vertical jump	Broad jump	Bench press
6 ft 4 in (1.93 m)	306 lb (139 kg)	5.17 s	1.81 s	2.99 s	4.63 s	8.16 s	27 1/2 in (0.70 m)	8 ft 9 in (2.67 m)	22 reps
All values from NFL Combine

Stone was rated the 10th best center in the 2014 NFL draft by NFLDraftScout.com.

=== Atlanta Falcons ===
Stone signed with the Atlanta Falcons on May 10, 2014, after going undrafted in the 2014 NFL Draft. He made his NFL debut on October 5, 2014, against the New York Giants. In the 2014 season, Stone was in 12 games, starting nine at center. On November 30, 2014, Stone's offense recorded 500 total yards versus the Arizona Cardinals. On December 8, 2014, Stone's offense recorded 465 total yards against the Green Bay Packers. Stone blocked for an offense that was 8th in the NFL in total offense with 378.2 yards per game. That same offense was 5th in passing yards per game with 284.6 yards a game.

On October 11, 2015, Stone filled in at center for an injured Mike Person, the offense gained a season-high 418 total yards, including 176 yards on the ground against the Washington Redskins. On October 15, 2015, Stone made his first start of the season, the offense gained 413 total yards, including 150 rushing yards against the New Orleans Saints. On December 18, 2015, Stone was placed on injured reserve with a knee injury. He was released by the Falcons with an injury settlement on July 19, 2016.

=== Tampa Bay Buccaneers ===
On January 20, 2017, Stone signed a reserve/future contract with the Tampa Bay Buccaneers. He was waived on September 2, 2017.

=== Oakland Raiders ===
On September 4, 2017, Stone was signed to the Oakland Raiders' practice squad. He was promoted to the active roster on December 20, 2017.

On September 1, 2018, Stone was released by the Raiders.

=== Chicago Bears ===
On September 3, 2018, Stone was signed to the Chicago Bears' practice squad. He was released on November 17, 2018.

Stone was suspended for the first three weeks of the 2019 NFL season, and was reinstated from suspension on September 24, 2019.
