= Xs on Your Eyes =

Studio album by +/-
- Released: October 15, 2008
- Genre: Alternative rock, indie rock
- Length: 48:01
- Label: Absolutely Kosher, &

+/- chronology
Self Titled Debut Digital Video Disc (2007)	Xs on Your Eyes (2008)	Thrown into the Fire (2009)

Professional ratings
Review scores
Source	Rating
Kabelbulme	(positive)
The Line of Best Fit	(93/100)
Magicrpm.com	(positive)
Pitchfork	(5.0/10)
QRO Magazine	(7.4/10)
Reax	4/5 stars
Spectrum Culture	(2.0/5.0)
Under the Radar	(8/10)
World of Music	4/5 stars

Xs on Your Eyes is the fourth album by +/-, released in late October 2008. An instrumental version of the song "sweet home Alabama" was used as background music in the menu loop of the band's 2007 Self Titled Debut Digital Video Disc DVD release. A music video for the song "Snowblind", directed by Nancy Mitchell, was released on 29 October 2008. The track "The Hours You Keep" appears as background music in Series 1 Episode 9 of the TV show Crash.

== Track listing ==
1. "Tired Eyes"
2. "Snowblind"
3. "Subdued"
4. "The Queen of Nothing"
5. "Halos"
6. "Unsung"
7. "The Hours You Keep"
8. "Marina"
9. "You'll Catch Your Death"
10. "Xs on Your Eyes"
11. "Flight Data Recorder"
12. "Reeling in the Years" (Bonus track on Japanese release)
