= Grenadine (band) =

American indie rock supergroup

- Origin: Arlington, Virginia
- Years active: 1991–1998
- Labels: Simple Machines/ TeenBeat/ Shimmy Disc
- Past members: Jenny Toomey; Mark Robinson; Rob Christiansen

Grenadine was an indie rock 'supergroup' from Arlington, Virginia comprising Jenny Toomey (of Tsunami), Mark Robinson (of Unrest), and Rob Christiansen (of Eggs). The band released two albums and three singles in the early 1990s. In contrast to the band members' other work, Grenadine's sound has been described as "lounge-pop".

== History ==
The band formed in 1991 and featured Jenny Toomey (vocals, guitar), Mark Robinson (vocals, guitar), and Rob Christiansen (trombone, guitar, drums). Their debut single Triology and the Kramer-produced album Goya were released in 1992 on Shimmy Disc in association with Toomey's and Robinson's labels, Simple Machines and TeenBeat respectively. Grenadine's second and final album, Nopalitos, was released in 1994. The band has been described as "indie-lounge-pop" and a "crooning, loungey cocktail act", and has also received comparisons to Rudy Vallee. The band continued until 1998.

== Discography ==
=== Albums ===
- Goya (1992), Simple Machines/TeenBeat/Shimmy Disc
- Nopalitos (1994), Simple Machines/TeenBeat

=== Singles ===
- Triology (1992), TeenBeat/Simple Machines - "Fillings"/"Gillan"
- "Don't Forget The Halo" (1993), TeenBeat/Simple Machines
- Christiansen EP (1994), TeenBeat/Simple Machines
