= Jumping the Tracks (+/- album) =

Studio album by +/-
- Released: February 4, 2014
- Genre: Alternative rock; indie rock
- Label: TeenBeat; &
- Producer: James Baluyut; Chris Deaner; Steve Choo

+/- chronology
Pulled Punches (2010)	Jumping the Tracks (2014)

Jumping the Tracks is the fifth studio album release from +/-. It contains 12 tracks.

== Critical reception ==
Professional ratings
Aggregate scores
Source	Rating
Metacritic	73/100
Review scores
Source	Rating
AllMusic	4/5 stars
Alternative Press	4/5 stars
PopMatters	4/10 stars

At Alternative Press, Annie Zaleski rated the album four stars out of five stars, stating the "Pensive and engaging, Jumping The Tracks is the quintessential headphones record that gets better with each listen." In addition, Zaleski noting that the album features "A smattering of atmosphere flourishes (backmasked sounds, twinkling percussion, howling harmonies) add welcome melancholy and texture." At AllMusic, Fred Thomas also rated the album four out of five stars and stated that the album "communicates greater depth and more sophistication than any of their other work."

== Track listing ==
1. "Young Once"
2. "The Bitterest Pill"
3. "Toe the Line"
4. "The Space Between Us"
5. "What Lies Ahead"
6. "Exorcising Your Ghost"
7. "Rewrite the Story"
8. "There Goes My Love"
9. "Running the Distance"
10. "No One Can Touch You Now"
11. "Jumping the Tracks (Bonus)"
12. "I'm a Little Teapot (Bonus)"
