= No Americana =

English alt-rock band

- Origin: Walsall, West Midlands, England, UK
- Genres: Alternative rock, rock, british rock
- Years active: 2009–2015
- Label: Vigo Records
- Past members: David James Foster; Adam Beddow; Jamie Weate; Daniel Taylor; Sam La'Penn
- Website: http://www.noamericana.com

No Americana were an English alternative rock band from Walsall, West Midlands, England. On 11 July 2011, they released their debut EP, Declaration of Independence.

== Formation and Declaration of Independence EP ==
No Americana formed in early 2009. Their first demo was recorded in Bark Studios, London, with producer Brian O'Shaughnessy (Primal Scream, My Bloody Valentine). The demo featured the track 'Never Say Never' which would later appear on their debut EP Declaration of Independence. The demo fell into the hands of the Metallica FOH engineer Big Mick Hughes after a chance meeting with frontman David in a Birmingham industrial estate cafe. After liking what he heard he decided to take the band on and manage them.

That year, No Americana went on to play a set on the Tuborg Stage at Download Festival followed by a UK tour support slot for The Wildhearts. They headed into rehearsal spaces to write more material, which resulted in the band being invited back to Download Festival in 2010 with better billing, and an additional slot for David and Adam while joining The Wildhearts frontman Ginger for his 'Guitarmageddon' set on the Jägermeister Stage. The band later joined Stone Sour for dates of their European tour.

Having still not released any official material (only demos), the band decided to head into a self-constructed studio.

Their debut EP Declaration of Independence was released on 11 July 2011. It received cult rave reviews and was shown great interest by Kerrang! Radio, particularly the track 'Wax Poetic'. This resulted in the band participating in the 'Kerrang! Breakthru Tour 2011'. and an appearance on the Jägermeister Stage at Sonisphere Festival, Knebworth.

The video for "Wax Poetic" was released on 8 February 2012, which featured the band being showered with water in a warehouse in Bolton. This led to Dan (drummer) becoming seriously ill with meningitis over the Christmas period prior to its release.

The band's second single, "Washed Out Summer", was released on 31 June.

== Musical style/influences ==
Their music has been described in a number of ways, but it is underpinned by catchy hooks, elements of frantic energy balanced by uplifting anthems, equal parts energy, artful songwriting and sharp, socially aware lyrics.

Influences come from all parts of the spectrum, with references made to commercial and current Rock, Metal, Punk and the more obscure and left-field genres. David regularly cites Oasis as an influence.

== Discography ==
=== EPs ===
Year	Release details
2011	Declaration of Independence EP: Release: 11 July 2011; Label: Vigo Records; Formats: Digital download, CD
2012	"Washed Out Summer": Release: 30 June 2012; Label: Vigo Records; Formats: Digital download
