= The Wolfgang Press =

English post-punk band

- 1992 4AD/Warner US promotional photo for Queer: Mick Allen, Mark Cox, Andrew Gray.

Background information
- Origin: London, England
- Genres: Post-punk, post-industrial
- Years active: 1983–1995, 2024–present
- Labels: 4AD, Warner Bros. (US)
- Members: Michael Allen; Andrew Gray; Stephen Gray
- Past members: Mark Cox
- Website: The Wolfgang Press at 4AD.com

The Wolfgang Press are an English post-punk band, originally active from 1983 to 1995. The core of the band during that era was Michael Allen (vocals, bass), Mark Cox (keyboards), and Andrew Gray (guitar). They reformed in 2024 with Stephen Gray, brother of Andrew, replacing Cox, to release a new LP titled "A 2nd Shape" on Downwards Records.

The group is best known for its 1992 international hit single "A Girl Like You".

== Style and influences ==
The official 4AD band profile describes them as "post-punk", transforming to "avant-dance groovers" with Queer. The group were frequently labelled "goth," though they denied the charge.

Allen's list of "important records" as of 1995 included De La Soul's 3 Feet High and Rising, Massive Attack's Blue Lines and "anything from Nick Cave and The Fall". He recalled that the record that "maybe started it all" for him was Public Image Ltd's Metal Box.

== History ==
=== Rema-Rema, Mass (1978–1981) ===
Allen started in the Models in 1977. Allen and Cox had both been members of Rema-Rema and Mass, while Gray had been a member of In Camera. All of these bands had also recorded for 4AD.

Rema-Rema were formed in 1978 by schoolmates Allen and Gary Asquith, with Cox, Marco Pirroni (also a school friend of Allen's and a fellow member of the Models) and Max Prior (who later recorded as Dorothy with Psychic TV). 4AD founder Ivo Watts-Russell said that hearing Rema-Rema's demo tape "was the first point I knew that we were actually doing something serious [with 4AD]." Their sole recording was the Wheel in the Roses 12"EP (4AD BAD-5, 1 Apr 1980). The band split when Pirroni left to join Adam and the Ants (although Pirroni says he had already left), and reformed as Mass.

Mass consisted of Allen and Cox with Asquith and Danny Briottet. Mass recorded a single, "You And I"/"Cabbage" (4AD AD-14, Oct 1980), and an album, Labour of Love (4AD CAD-107, May 1981). Mass split in 1981. Asquith and Briottet later (1986) formed Renegade Soundwave. (Asquith remained a friend and contributed to Queer.)

=== The Burden of Mules (1983) ===
After Mass split, Allen and Cox continued working together. The Burden of Mules was described by Trouser Press as "dark and cacophonous, an angry, intense slab of post-punk gloom that is best left to its own (de)vices"; the AllMusic Guide to Electronica describes some tracks as "so morose and vehement as to verge on self-parody." ZigZag was more positive, regarding the album as an artistic success and an "emphatic statement." The band's career retrospective compilation, Everything Is Beautiful, contains no tracks from the album.

Guest musicians included Richard Thomas (Dif Juz), David Steiner (In Camera) and guitarist and percussionist Andrew Gray, who soon joined the band.

=== Early EPs ===
The EPs Scarecrow, Water and Sweatbox followed, produced by Robin Guthrie. These were later compiled (with some remixed versions) as The Legendary Wolfgang Press and Other Tall Stories. The AllMusic Guide to Electronica describes Scarecrow as "a lighter, more streamlined affair", Water as spotlighting "ominously sparse torch songs", and Sweatbox as "deconstructionist pop".

=== Standing Up Straight (1986) ===
The 4AD band profile describes Standing Up Straight as "an intense blend of industrial and classical tropes". Trouser Press describes it as "as challenging and inventive as the band's other work, adding industrial and classical instrumentation to the creative arsenal", "dark and thoroughly uncompromising" and "not for the easily intimidated." The AllMusic Guide to Electronica describes it as "a challenging, even punishing album, but a rewarding one as well."

=== Bird Wood Cage (1988) ===
The AllMusic Guide to Electronica notes Bird Wood Cage as "one of the most pivotal records in the Wolfgang Press catalog; here, the trio begins to incorporate the dance and funk elements which would ultimately emerge as the dominant facet of their work." Trouser Press describes Bird Wood Cage as "inserting fascinating bits of business into superficially forbidding songs", including female backing vocals, funky wah-wah guitar and elements of dub reggae.

The album was preceded by the EP Big Sex, which presages Bird Wood Cage's musical themes. "King of Soul", "Kansas" and "Raintime"/"Bottom Drawer" were singles from the album.

Allen later said that Bird Wood Cage was the Wolfgang Press album he was most proud of.

=== Queer (1991), "A Girl Like You" (1992) ===
The genesis of the 1991 album Queer was listening to De La Soul's 1989 debut album 3 Feet High and Rising. As Allen put it, this was when they "rediscovered that music could indeed be fun." "It seemed such a joyous record. There was a freshness and ease about the way it was made that inspired us to reassess our working process."

The album's sound includes many samples and funkier, poppier beats than previous albums. The AllMusic Guide to Electronica describes it as "alien funk, a collection of idiosyncratic rhythms, dark textures, and ominous grooves." The band members each play multiple instruments, making the sound fuller than previous work. Bassist Leslie Langston of Throwing Muses guests on most tracks.

The singles from the album were "Time" (the album version being titled "Question of Time"), which included a sample from Pink Floyd's "Time" (from The Dark Side of the Moon), followed by a cover of Randy Newman's "Mama Told Me Not to Come".

The single "A Girl Like You" was released in May 1992 and became an international hit, scoring No. 2 on the Billboard US Modern Rock (Alternative Songs) chart on 15 August 1992. The song was later covered by Tom Jones (with Allen and Gray providing bass and guitar on the recording), who then asked the band to write "Show Me (Some Devotion)" for him, both recordings appearing on The Lead and How to Swing It (1994). Jones also joined them on-stage for All Virgos Are Mad, a 4AD anniversary concert in Los Angeles in January 1995.

Due to sample clearance issues, the 1992 U.S. release of Queer (which includes "A Girl Like You") needed considerable rerecording and remixing.

=== Funky Little Demons (1995) ===
After "A Girl Like You", the band bought their own studio, removing the financial pressure of traditional studio rental. The band spent two years recording Funky Little Demons.

Trouser Press describes the album as "straight-ahead dance music with the correct materials", though "no longer enigmatic risk-takers, the Wolfgang Press have become just another white post-new wave soul band."

The single "Going South" reached No. 117 on the UK Singles Chart and No. 33 on the US alternative chart. A promotional CD of "Christianity" was also distributed in the US and a video released, directed by Mark Neale, but the band was dropped by 4AD before the single could be released.

The album spent one week on the UK Albums Chart at No. 75 in February 1995.

Cox left the band in February 1995, shortly before the release of the album. Allen and Gray aimed to continue, and toured the US without Cox to promote the album, but later conceded the band had run its course.

=== Post-Wolfgang Press and Unremembered Remembered ===
A compilation album, Everything Is Beautiful (A Retrospective 1983–1995), was released in 2001. (Despite the name, it contains nothing from before 1984.)

Allen records and plays live periodically with his band Geniuser with Giuseppe De Bellis, whom Allen regards as the driving force. Geniuser released the album Mud Black on the Phisteria label in 2005, an EP called Press/Delete in 2010 on the same label, and another album in 2018 on the Ooh Ahh Records label called "I Am". Allen also played with Gary Asquith's Lavender Pill Mob.

Gray recorded under the name Limehouse Outlaw, and released an album Homegrown on his own label on 27 May 2002, with some songs co-written by Allen. Gray also recorded with the Lavender Pill Mob.

Cox has contributed writing and production to a project entitled U:guru.

In 1995 and 1996, after Cox had left the band and Funky Little Demons had been released, the duo of Allen and Gray had planned a follow-up album. Six songs from these sessions would be finally released on Record Store Day 2020, under the title Unremembered Remembered. The album is billed as a mini-LP and as the band's final studio album. Although there was a seventh track recorded, the band opted not to include it on the release.

The band released a new album returning to their noisier, post punk Burden Of Mules-era sound, A 2nd Shape, on September 27, 2024. This album, released digitally, consists of a new lineup including original members Michael Allen and Andrew Gray, with Andrew Gray's brother Stephen Gray replacing Mark Cox.

== Name ==
Although some sources indicate that they named themselves after German actor Wolfgang Preiss, Spin said the band claimed to have named themselves after a device that Mozart tried (unsuccessfully) to invent to type out his music. No such device is known. Allen has stated elsewhere that the name was chosen to be "meaningless and open to interpretation."

== Discography ==
=== Albums ===
- The Burden of Mules (Aug 1983), 4AD
- Standing Up Straight (Aug 1986), 4AD
- Bird Wood Cage (7 Nov 1988), 4AD (1988 CD includes Big Sex EP)
- Queer (5 Aug 1991), 4AD (initial vinyl copies included 12" EP Sucker of remixes by Martyn Young of Colourbox)
- Queer (1992), 4AD/Warner U.S.
- Funky Little Demons (23 January 1995), 4AD (initial CD copies with four-track remix bonus disc)
- Unremembered Remembered (29 August 2020), 4AD
- A 2nd Shape (27 September 2024), Downwards
- Asylum Variations (25 September 2026)

=== Singles and EPs ===
- Scarecrow (12" EP, recorded July 1984, released August 1984), 4AD
- Water (12" EP, recorded January 1985, released March 1985), 4AD
- Sweatbox (12" EP, recorded Apr 1985, released Jul 1985), 4AD
- Big Sex (12" EP, recorded Dec 1986, released Apr 1987), 4AD
- "King of Soul" (12", 22 Aug 1988), 4AD
- "Kansas" (12", 30 January 1989), 4AD
- "Raintime/Bottom Drawer" (12" / CD, 2 May 1989), 4AD
- "Time" (12" / CD, 2 Apr 1991), 4AD
- "Mama Told Me Not to Come" (7" / 12", 13 May 1991), 4AD/Warner U.S.
- "A Girl Like You" (7" / 12" / CD), 4AD/Warner U.S.
- "Going South", 4AD/Warner U.S.
- "Christianity" (CD), 4AD/Warner U.S.

=== Compilations ===
- The Legendary Wolfgang Press and Other Tall Stories (Nov 1985), 4AD - compilation of EPs Scarecrow, Water and Sweatbox with some different versions / CD includes two bonus tracks: "The Deep Briny" and "Muted"
- Everything Is Beautiful (A Retrospective 1983-1995) (1 Oct 2001), 4AD

=== Various artists compilation appearances ===
- State of Affairs (Pleasantly Surprised cassette PS-002, 1984): "Prostitute" (Remixed Version)
- Dreams and Desires (Pleasantly Surprised cassette PS-006, 1984): "Ecstasy" (instrumental)
- Document: Pleasantly Surprised (82 - 85) (Pleasantly Surprised cassette PS-012, Feb 1986): "Prostitute" (Remixed Version)
- Abstract 5 (Sweatbox AMO-5, 1985; LP with Abstract magazine No. 5): "Fire Eater" (Remix)
- Lonely Is an Eyesore (4AD CAD-703, June 1987): "Cut the Tree"
- Unbelievable - The Indie Dance Album (Posh Music for Kids UNB-101, 1991): "Time"
- Volume One (Volume CD, Sep 1991; CD with Volume magazine No. 1): "Sucker" (Version) (3:36)
- Rough Trade: Music for the 90's Vol. 3 (Rough Trade Deutschland RTD-199.1215.2 CD, 1991): "Louis XIV" (4:10)
- NME Viva 8 - Live at the Town and Country Club 8-1-92 (NME, 1992): "Dreams and Light" (3:22)
- Lilliput 1 & 2 (4AD LILLIPUT-1+2, 1992): "A Girl Like You", "Birmingham"
- 4AD Presents the 13 Year Itch CD (4AD SHUFFLE-1, 1993): "Peace on Fire" (4:02)
- 4AD Presents the 13 Year Itch VHS (4AD SHUFFLE-1, 1993): "Kansas"
- All Virgos Are Mad (4AD/Warner 45789 CD, 1994; free CD for All Virgos Are Mad shows): "One"
- All Virgos Are Mad (4AD/Warner 45789 CD, 1994; free VHS for All Virgos Are Mad shows): "Kansas"
- Facing the Wrong Way (4AD FTWW-1, 1995): "Christianity" (Wicked Man Remix)
