= Standing Up Straight =

Studio album by the Wolfgang Press
- Released: 1 May 1986
- Recorded: January and March 1986
- Studio: Blackwing, London
- Genre: Post-punk, art pop
- Label: 4AD
- Producer: John Fryer

The Wolfgang Press chronology
The Burden of Mules (1983)	Standing Up Straight (1986)	Bird Wood Cage (1988)

Standing Up Straight is the second studio album by English post-punk band the Wolfgang Press. It was released on 1 May 1986, through record label 4AD.

== Background ==
"I Am the Crime" features vocals by Cocteau Twins vocalist and label-mate Elizabeth Fraser.

== Critical reception ==
Professional ratings
Review scores
Source	Rating
AllMusic	4.5/5 stars
The Encyclopedia of Popular Music	3/5 stars
MusicHound Rock: The Essential Album Guide	4/5 stars

AllMusic called Standing Up Straight "a challenging, even punishing album, but a rewarding one as well." Trouser Press wrote that "musically, Standing Up Straight is as challenging and inventive as the band’s other work, adding industrial and classical instrumentation to the creative arsenal."

== Track listing ==
All tracks are written by Andrew Gray, Mark Cox and Michael Allen.

Side A
No.	Title	Length
1.	"Dig a Hole"	4:31
2.	"My Life"	4:04
3.	"Hammer the Halo"	5:10
4.	"Bless My Brother"	1:22
5.	"Fire-Fly"	4:17

Side B
No.	Title	Length
1.	"Ghost"	4:22
2.	"Rotten Fodder"	6:12
3.	"Forty Days, Thirty Nights"	3:24
4.	"I Am the Crime"	6:03

== Personnel ==
- The Wolfgang Press – production, sleeve art direction

Additional personnel

- Gini Ball – violin on "Dig a Hole" and "I Am the Crime", viola on "I Am the Crime"
- John Fryer – marimba on "Ghost", percussion on "Rotten Fodder", production, programming, engineering
- Elizabeth Fraser – vocals (additional) on "I Am the Crime"
- Martin McGarrick – cello on "I Am the Crime"

Technical

- 23 Envelope – sleeve design, typography and photography
- Chris Bigg – sleeve typography
- Ruth Rowland – sleeve typography
