= Preston Brown (wide receiver) =

American football player (born 1958)

No. 81, 87, 89
- Position: Wide receiver

Personal information
- Born: March 2, 1958 (age 68); Nashville, Tennessee, U.S.
- Listed height: 5 ft 10 in (1.78 m)
- Listed weight: 184 lb (83 kg)

Career information
- High school: Maplewood (Nashville)
- College: Vanderbilt
- NFL draft: 1980: 6th round, 160th overall pick

Career history
- New England Patriots (1980–1982); Baltimore Colts (1983)*; New York Jets (1983); Cleveland Browns (1984); Memphis Showboats (1985)
- * Offseason or practice squad member only

Awards and highlights
- First-team All-SEC (1979)

Career NFL statistics
- Receptions: 4
- Receiving yards: 114
- Touchdowns: 1
- Stats at Pro Football Reference

Preston Neville Brown (born March 2, 1958) is an American former professional football player who was a wide receiver for the New England Patriots, New York Jets, and Cleveland Browns of the National Football League (NFL). He played college football for the Vanderbilt Commodores.
