= Vomit Launch =

Vomit Launch was an indie rock band formed in Chico, California in 1985 as "an excuse to drink beer". In 1992, the band called it quits and played their last show on December 11, 1992.

Larry Crane, who played bass for the band, now runs Tape Op magazine. Trish de Rowland lives in Chico, California with her writer/musician/model husband, Bob Howard. Steve Bragg also resides in Chico, where he runs the screen print/embroidery business 'Limey Tees'.

== Band members ==
- Steve Bragg - drums
- Larry Crane - bass/guitar/vocals
- Patricia de Rowland - vocals
- Lindsey Thrasher - guitar/vocals

== Discography ==
=== Albums and cassettes ===
- Fishbutt, 1985 (CS)
- Not Even Pretty EP, Rat Box Records, 1987 (LP)
- Not Even Pretty (Remix), Rat Box Records, 1987 (CS)
- Exiled Sandwich, Rat Box Records, 1988 (LP)
- Fuckerbarf, Rat Box Records, 1988 (CS)
- Exiled Sandwich, T42 Records, Germany, 1989 (LP)
- Mr. Spench, Rough Trade/Mad Rover, 1990 (CD/LP/CS)
- Dogeared, Teenbeat/Mad Rover, 1992 (CD/CS)
- Not Even Pretty +, Teenbeat, 1993 (CD)

=== Singles ===
- "Knock Yourself", 1987 (7")
- "Relapsation", Teenbeat Records, 1989 (7")
- "Of", Teenbeat Records, 1990 (7")
- "Boltcutters & Beer", Rough Trade/Mad Rover, 1991 (7")

=== Compilations and soundtracks ===
- "Swelling Admiration" (remix) on At Diane's Place, Penultimate Records, 1987 (LP)
- Three songs appears in My Degeneration, Jon Moritsugu film, 1989 (film)
- "Life Sucks" on The Thing That Ate Floyd, Lookout! Records, 1989 (LP)
- Various tracks on Don't Say Nein, Cuacha Records, Germany, 1990 (LP)
- "Exit Lines" off Exiled Sandwich appears in the movie The Wackness, 2008 (film)
