= Maplewood High School (Tennessee) =

Location
- 401 Walton Lane; Nashville, Tennessee 37216; United States
- Coordinates: 36.23217°N 86.74983°W

Information
- Type: Public High School
- Motto: "Pride, Dignity, and Excellence pave the road to success."
- Established: 1956
- Principal: Sonya Brooks
- Teaching staff: 40.33 (FTE)
- Grades: 9–12
- Enrollment: 691 (2022–2023)
- Student to teacher ratio: 17.13
- Colors: Maroon and silver
- Athletics: TSSAA
- Mascot: Panthers
- Website: https://maplewood.mnps.org/

Maplewood High School is a secondary education facility operated by Metropolitan Nashville Public Schools in Nashville, Tennessee, United States. It is located barely one-fourth mile east of Nashville's historic Dickerson Road and borders on Ellington Parkway on the west. The school was formerly called Maplewood Comprehensive High School until March 2012 when the Metro Board of Education dropped the "Comprehensive" title from all its zoned schools to reflect the district's new emphases on smaller learning communities and thematic career academies.

Maplewood High School opened its doors in 1956 to a community that had a long-standing desire for a school. The school faces Maplewood Lane from which it derived its name. It sits on land once owned by Jere Baxter (1852–1904), a prominent Nashvillian who was both a strong supporter of public education and an entrepreneur.

Maplewood opened with 13 teachers and 404 students enrolled in grades 7 and 8 and continued to increase with a grade each year. By 1961–62 the enrollment reached 1,468; that spring 84 students — 51 girls and 33 boys — were in the first graduation. The school grew rapidly because of the development of residential subdivisions including Gra-Mar, Hillhurst, Bellshire, Oak Valley, Shepherdwood, Kemper Heights, Haynes Heights, Haynes Manor, Parkwood and Trinity Hills. Zone changes and the construction of Ewing Park School also influenced enrollment. Another transition occurred when East High School was closed. In the spring of 2003, enrollment increased at Maplewood by nearly 300 students as a result of re-zoning two feeder schools. In addition, a small English language learner student population was transferred from Maplewood to another high school.

At the beginning of the 2005–2006 school year, a guidance counselor, an attendance officer, and a social worker were new personnel additions. Other changes included a new head coach, a librarian, and two new assistant principals, one of whom had been a teacher at the school. Significantly, a new executive principal was assigned to Maplewood, the eighth person to serve in this position in half a century.

== Notable alumni ==
- Brenda Lee, Country Music Legend
- Avion Black, former National Football League wide receiver
- E.J. Junior, All-American linebacker at the University of Alabama, former NFL linebacker
- James Stone, former NFL center
- Rita Coolidge, singer
- The Feminine Complex, All-female American garage rock band in the 1960s
- Preston Brown, former NFL wide receiver
