= Butch Willis =

Butch Willis is an American musician signed to TeenBeat Records. His recordings were first released on his own private record label, Love Records, in the 1980s and then on TeenBeat Records in the 1990s through to the present. TeenBeat has also reissued various releases originally issued on Love Records. Willis' releases are often credited to Butch Willis & The Rocks and Butch Willis & D Flat.

Willis has often been compared to other artists with cult followings such as Roky Erickson of the 13th Floor Elevators and Daniel Johnston. His musical style is broadly referred to as outsider art or art brut. Specifically, his music is a mixture of classic rock, new wave, and rockabilly.

== Select discography ==
=== Singles ===
- 1983: "The Garden's Outside"/"I'll Never Be The Same Again" (Love 001)
- 1997: "The Garden's Outside"/"I'll Never Be The Same Again" (Teen-Beat 234)

=== EPs ===
- 1990: Shopping Bag E.P. (Teen-Beat 44)
- 1996: Speedballs (Teen-Beat 204)

=== Albums ===
- 1983: Of (Love 1215225)
- 1986: Forthcomings (Love 1002)
- 1994: Repeats (Teen-Beat 134)
- 1995: Conquering The Ice (Teen-Beat 154)
- 2000: Superstitious Mummies/Of 2 (Teen-Beat 284)
- 2002: Rawed Out Of The Bottom Basement (Teen-Beat 364)
- 2005: Locked In This Room (Teen-Beat 384)

=== Guest appearances ===
- 1993: Unrest ‒ "Where Are All Those Puerto Rican Boys?" (special vocals by Butch Willis)/Stereolab ‒ "Mountain" (Teen-Beat 121)

=== Compilations ===
- 1993: TeenBeat Fifty (Teen-Beat 50)
- 1993: TeenBeat 100 (Teen-Beat 100)
- 1994: Wakefield: Volume 1, A TeenBeat Sampler (Teen-Beat 141)
- 1995: Wakefield: The TeenBeat Boxed Set (Teen-Beat 181)
- 1997: 1997 TeenBeat Sampler (Tean-Beat 221)
- 1999: 1999 TeenBeat Sampler (Teen-Beat 271)
- 2000: 2000 TeenBeat Sampler (Teen-Beat 291)
- 2001: 2001 TeenBeat Sampler (Teen-Beat 311)
- 2002: 2002 TeenBeat Sampler (Teen-Beat 331)
- 2004: TeenBeat Subscribers' Audio Compact Disk (Teen-Beat 359)
- 2008: TeenBeat No. 1 Record Label (Teen-Beat 411)
- 2010: 2010 TeenBeat/Other Music Sampler (Teen-Beat 481)

== Filmography ==
- 1990: Bring Me The Head Of Butch Willis (indie film produced by John Heyn and ex-Willis manager, Jeff Krulik)
- 2019: Amateur On Plastic (full-length documentary film directed by Mark Robinson) (Teen-Beat 564)
