= What Lies Below =

What Lies Below may refer to:

- "What Lies Below" (Fringe), an episode of the American television series Fringe
- What Lies Below (film), a 2020 American horror film
