= The Rondelles =

American indie pop band

- Origin: Albuquerque, New Mexico, U.S.
- Genres: Indie rock
- Years active: c.1996–2001

The Rondelles were an American indie pop band, originally from Albuquerque, New Mexico. Their first album Fiction Romance Fast Machines, was released in 1998 by Sonic Youth drummer Steve Shelley's Smells Like Records.

== History ==
The Rondelles three members were still in high school when they formed the band in the mid-1990s - Juliet Swango on guitar and vocals, Yukiko Moynihan on bass, and Oakley Munson on drums and keyboard. The band landed support slots for Sleater Kinney and Sonic Youth. At live shows, Munson showcased his signature method of playing a 3-piece drum set standing up, while playing the keyboard with his drum stick. This technique, combined with Swango's primitive guitar set-up (a bare-bones four-string guitar with Drop-D tuning) created a distinctive garage rock sound.

In Albuquerque, the Rondelles were part of a group of indiepop bands that often played together. Among these other bands were The Shins (and Shins precursor Flake Music), Scared of Chaka, The Drags, The Alarm Clocks, The Young Adults, and The Ponies. The three members of the Rondelles were also three-quarters of the final lineup of the Albuquerque sci-fi-themed pop-punk act, LuxoChamp, behind singer-guitarist Brad Beshaw. Oakley played a full drum kit in LuxoChamp, and Juliet played a Moog and a Realistic keyboard.

The band later moved to Washington, D.C., where they continued to perform and record nationally until late summer of 2001, when they disbanded after their first and only European tour. They recorded their second and final album, The Fox (Teen Beat), in 2000 with producer Trevor Kampmann in an apartment recording studio in the Logan Circle neighborhood of D.C. A four-week summer tour with The Mooney Suzuki (supporting their People Get Ready album) followed its release, in addition to tours supporting Dead Meadow (Matador Records), Stereo Total, and others. Har Mar Superstar (Sean Tillmann) was a tour mate during this period as well, supporting the band on a U.S. tour in the summer of 2000. The band's final tour in the summer of 2001 reached the Netherlands, Germany, Austria, Italy, and France; a final European tour lineup included guitarist Corey Shane and bassist Darian Zahedi, after Yukiko's departure in 2000.

=== Post-break up ===
Juliet Swango started her second band, The Foxx, after returning to Albuquerque in 2002. In 2004, The Foxx released a self-titled album; in 2007, a second album, Lila, was released on Chicago's Vinyl Countdown Records. Lila was recorded and produced by San Francisco's Birdman Records artist Greg Ashley. Swango relocated to New York in 2010 with The Foxx, which disbanded in 2014. She joined Phenomenal Handclap Band in 2014, and with co-members Daniel Collás and Monika Heidemann, continued to record and release, with a proposed 2023 EP on Brooklyn’s Razor-N-Tape. Swango performed backing vocals on Brian Jackson's 2022 album on BBE, produced by Collás.

Oakley Munson relocated in New York, forming the New York-based band The Witnesses in 2001 (disbanded 2006) and went on to form Puddin' Tang with Kristen Munchheimer. He is also played in the Los Angeles-based Old Testament, with Jason Simon of Dead Meadow (Matador Records). As of 2016, he plays with The Black Lips.

The Rondelles played reunion shows in 2007 and 2010.

== Discography ==
=== Albums ===
- Fiction Romance Fast Machines (Smells Like Records; CD/LP; 1998)
- The Fox (TeenBeat Records; CD/LP; 1999)

==== Compilations ====
- Shined Nickels and Loose Change (K Records; CD; 2001)
- In Your Face (TeenBeat Records; CDR; 2008), a collection of early demos (1995-1996)
- Good Enough For Gravy (TeenBeat Records; CDR; 2008), the final recordings (2000-2001)

=== EPs and singles ===
- "He's Out of Sight" (Grist Milling Records; 7"; 1996)
- "The Rondelles" (TeenBeat Records; 7"; 1997)
- "Revenge" (K Records; 7"; 1998)
- "TV Zombie" (K Records; 7"; 1999)

=== Compilation appearances ===
- Battle of the Bands Comp (Super-8 Records; 7"; 1998)
- In Their Eyes: 90's Teen Bands vs 80's Teen Movies (Rhino Records; CD; 1998) "I'll Melt With You"
- TeenBeat 1998 Sampler (TeenBeat Records; CD; 1998) "Revenge"
- New Wave Explosion (Super-8 Underground; CD; 1999) "Cafeteria Rock"
- TeenBeat 1999 Sampler (TeenBeat Records; CD; 1999) "Like A Prayer"
- TeenBeat 2000 Sampler (TeenBeat Records; CD; 2000) "The Fox"
- TeenBeat 2001 Sampler (TeenBeat Records; CD; 2001) "Pls Shut Up"
