= Declaration of Independence (EP) =

- Declaration of Independence EP cover

EP by No Americana
- Released: July 11, 2011
- Recorded: Fiveways Studios
- Genre: Alternative rock
- Label: Vigo Records

Declaration of Independence is an EP by alternative rock band No Americana.

== Track listing ==
No.	Title	Length
1.	"Never Say Never"	3:12
2.	"Method In My Madness"	3:13
3.	"Wax Poetic"	3:24
4.	"The Science of Seduction"	3:21
5.	"Sing For A Winner"	3:40
6.	"Bringin' Me Down"	3:24
