= Dustdevils =

Noise rock band

- Origin: Leeds, England
- Genre: Noise rock
- Years active: 1984-1990s
- Labels: Matador Records, TeenBeat Records
- Members: Michael Duane, Mark Ibold, Dave Reid, Sasha Frere-Jones, Keith Gregory
- Past members: Jaqi Dulany, Gerard Cosloy, Adam Cormack, Andy Johnson

The Dustdevils (sometimes styled as DustDevils, Dust Devils, or DUSTdevils) were a noise rock band based out of New York City for most of its existence. Active from the 1980s through the mid 1990s, the Dustdevils were among the first artists to be signed to Matador Records. Its members included bassist Mark Ibold, who later joined Pavement and Sonic Youth in 1992 and 2006, respectively. Ibold met the band while working at a restaurant in the East Village and performed on their album Struggling Electric and Chemical. Sasha Frere-Jones also played guitar in the group for a time.

== History ==
The band formed in 1984, when British expat Michael Duane, the band's guitarist, met Jaqi Dulany (also known as Jaqui Delaney and Jacqui Cohen), the band's Australian-born vocalist, in New York City. The band then relocated to Leeds from 1986 to 1988, during which time they released several records on Rouska and Keith Gregory of the Wedding Present joined the band as their bassist. They released a Kramer-produced 7" entitled "Is Big Leggy" on TeenBeat Records in 1989, followed by Geek Drip later that year and Struggling Electric and Chemical in 1990. The Wharton Tiers-produced Struggling was released jointly by TeenBeat and Matador, and opened with a cover of "Hip Priest" by The Fall, which was described by Greg Kot as "a mind-blowing masterpiece of corrosion and decay." Jaqi and Michael split in 1993, which left Michael to look for replacement vocalists. Also that year, Gerard Cosloy stopped playing with the band as their stand-in bassist.

== Discography ==
- Seeds In The Spoil — 1987 (Rouska)
- Rhenyard's Grin — 1987 (Rouska)
- Mother Shipton — 1987 (Rouska)
- The Dropping Well — 1987 (Rouska)
- Gutter Light — 1988 (Rouska)
- Geek Drip — 1989 (Matador)
- "... Is Big Leggy" — 1989 (Teenbeat)
- Struggling Electric and Chemical — 1990 (Teenbeat/Matador)
- "Extant" — 1996 (Matador)
