= Air Miami (band) =

American indie rock band

- Origin: Washington, D.C., United States
- Genres: Indie rock
- Years active: 1994–1996
- Labels: TeenBeat Records; 4AD
- Past members: Mark Robinson; Bridget Cross; Lauren Feldsher, (1994); Mike Fellows, (1994)

Air Miami was an American indie rock band from Washington, D.C. that was active from 1994 to 1996. The band was formed by Mark Robinson and Bridget Cross, both former members of Unrest, a few months later they became a quartet with the addition of drummer Mike Fellows and bassist Lauren Feldsher. They had releases on the 4AD Records and TeenBeat Records labels.

The 7" single "Airplane Rider" received quite a bit of attention from college radio, as did the song "World Cup Fever".

== Discography ==
- Fourteen Songs cassette (self-released, 1994)
- Airplane Rider 7"45 (Teenbeat, 1994)
- Sixteen Songs cassette (self-released, 1994)
- Me. Me. Me. LP (4AD/Teenbeat, 1995)
- Fuck You, Tiger EP (4AD/Teenbeat, 1995)
- World Cup Fever Remixes EP (Teenbeat, 1998)
