= Aden (band) =

US musical group

- Origin: Chicago, Illinois, U.S.
- Genres: Indie pop
- Years active: 1995–2002
- Label: TeenBeat
- Members: Kevin Barker; Jeff Gramm; Fred Kovey
- Past members: Josh Klein

Aden was an American band which was influenced by 1970s soft rock such as Steely Dan (from whom they borrowed the title of their albums Hey 19 and Black Cow). It was composed of Jeff Gramm (the son of former U.S. Senator and presidential candidate Phil Gramm), Fred Kovey and Josh Klein.

== History ==
Aden was formed at the University of Chicago in 1995, but since 1997 (when original drummer Josh Klein left the band) none of Aden's members has lived in the same city. Although the band has not recorded since 2002, guitarist and banjo player Kevin Barker has continued to play and record solo (as Currituck Co) and has collaborated live and on record with luminaries of the Naturalismo/New Weird America scene such as Vashti Bunyan, Devendra Banhart, Joanna Newsom and Vetiver.

== Discography ==
=== Albums ===
- Aden - Fortune4 Records - 1997, re-issued by Teenbeat - 2006
- Black Cow - Teenbeat Records - 1999
- Hey 19 - Teenbeat Records - 2000
- Topsiders - Teenbeat Records - 2002

=== Singles ===
- "Scooby Doo" 7 inch - 1995
- "Cause of Your Tears" 7 inch - 1996
