= Eggs (band) =

American indie rock band

- Origin: Washington, D.C., United States
- Genres: Indie rock, indie pop, guitar pop, lounge pop
- Years active: 1990–1995
- Label: TeenBeat
- Past members: Andrew Beaujon; Dave Park; Marianne McGee; John Rickman; Rob Christiansen; Evan Shurak; Ian Jones; Jane Buscher; Brian Markovitz; Jacquelyn Briskman; Patrick Gough

Eggs was an American indie rock band based in Washington, D.C., centered on Andrew Beaujon. The band was formed in 1990 in Richmond, Virginia, United States. They were active in the early to mid 1990s and was signed to prominent indie pop record label TeenBeat Records.

Beaujon had previously appeared with Mark Nelson in the Virginia Teenbeat rock band Scaley Andrew and the Lizards from Hell.

== Musical style ==
The band's 1992 debut album Bruiser "explored the more easy-listening cocktail-lounge side of guitar-pop," according to Kembrew McLeod of AllMusic. The group's second album Teenbeat 96 has been described as more experimental, and leaning towards a lounge pop sound.

== Legacy ==
According to Kembrew McLeod of AllMusic, "Eggs was one of Washington, D.C.'s best indie-pop bands of the early 1990s, but were often lost in the shadows of their labelmates Unrest."

== Discography ==
=== Albums ===
- Bruiser (1992) Teenbeat 76
- Teenbeat 96 Exploder (1994) Teenbeat 96
- How Do You Like Your Lobster? - A Collection Of Crustaceans And Flotsam (compilation of singles, 1995) Teenbeat 156

=== Singles ===
- "Skyscraper" / "Ocelot" (1992) Teenbeat 66
- "Pit with Spikes" / "A Sparkling Mix" (1993) Teenbeat 116
- "Sexual Tension" (1993) Jade Tree
- "The Government Administrator" / "Sugar Babe" (1993) Hemiola 3
- "Genetic Engineering" (OMD cover) / "Genetic Engineers" (1994) Teenbeat 136
