= Chris Deaner =

American drummer

- Genres: rock, pop
- Occupations: musician, songwriter
- Instruments: Drums, Vibraphone
- Years active: 2001–present
- Labels: Teenbeat, Absolutely Kosher
- Website: +/- site

Chris Deaner is an American drummer, film maker and computer programmer. He is best known as the drummer for Plus/Minus from 2001 onwards, as a founding member of Loudest Boom Bah Yea, and as the drummer for Kelly Clarkson from 2007 to 2008. He has directed a majority of videos for Plus/Minus and won the Best Video award at the 7th Annual San Diego Asian Film Festival for his direction of the band's Steal the Blueprints clip.

Deaner worked as a lead programmer on the multiplayer online game Code of Everand.

He is notable as an endorser of Ludwig Drums, Vic Firth and Istanbul Cymbals.
