= +/- (band) =

American indietronic band

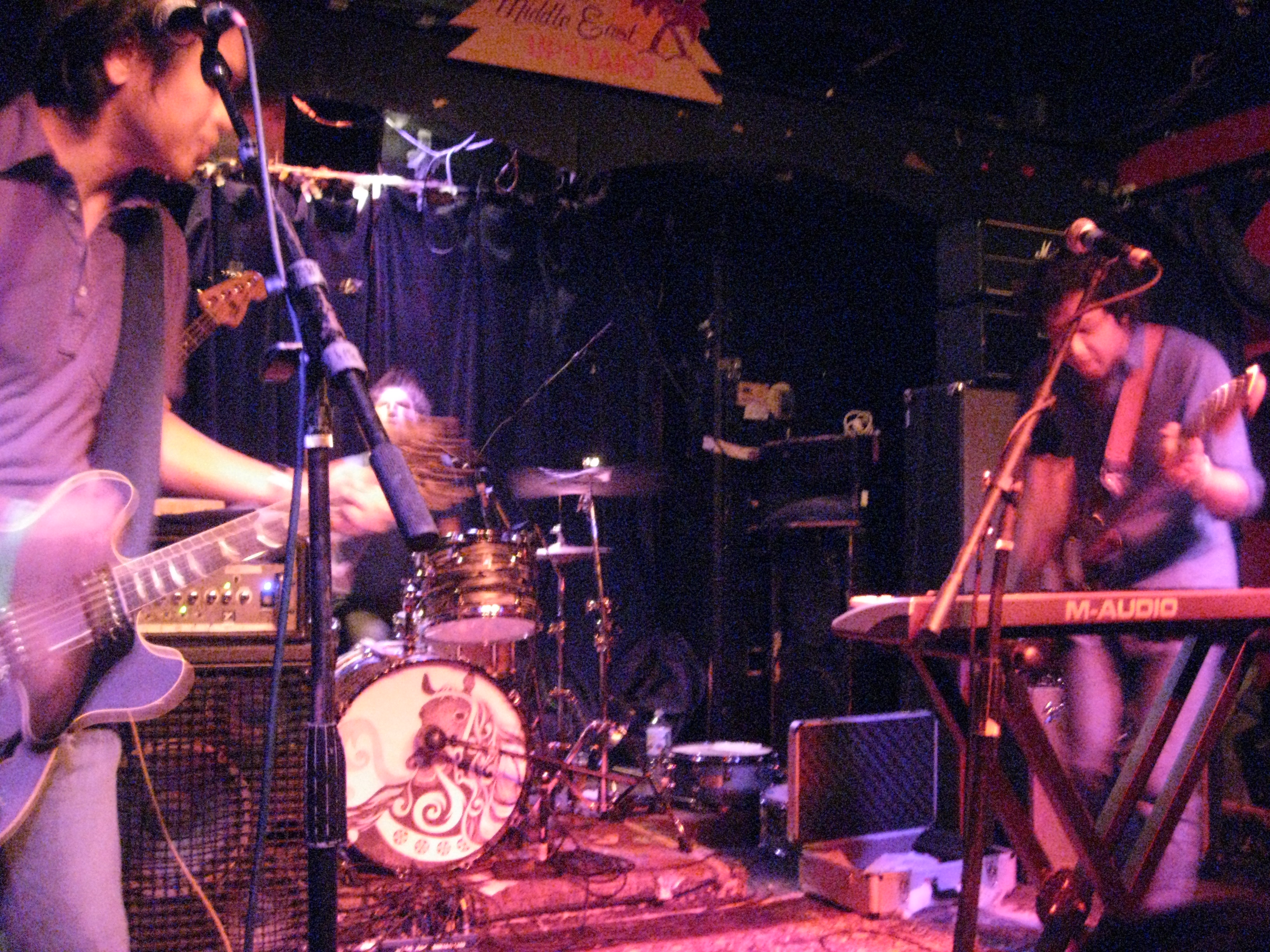
- +/- in August 2008

Background information
- Origin: New York, U.S.
- Genres: Indie electronic; indie pop
- Years active: 2001–present
- Labels: TeenBeat; Absolutely Kosher; &; White Wabbit; BB*Island
- Members: James Baluyut; Patrick Ramos; Chris Deaner
- Past members: Margaret McCartney
- Website: plusmin.us

+/-, or Plus/Minus, is an American indietronic band formed in 2001. The band makes use of both electronic and traditional instruments, and has sought to use electronics to recreate traditional indie rock song forms and instrumental structures. The group has released two albums on each of the American indie labels Teenbeat Records and Absolutely Kosher, and their track "All I Do" was prominently featured in the soundtrack for the major film Wicker Park. The group has developed a devoted following in Japan and Taiwan, and has toured there frequently. Although many artists append bonus tracks onto the end of Japanese album releases to discourage purchasers from buying cheaper US import versions, the overseas versions of +/- albums are usually quite different from the US versions – track lists can be rearranged, artwork with noticeable changes is used, and tracks from the US version can be replaced as well as augmented by bonus tracks.

== History ==
Teenbeat Records owner Mark Robinson had been impressed by a solo track that James Baluyut contributed to a 2000 EP Drawn and Quartered issued by Versus, an influential indie rock band in which Baluyut played 2nd guitar. Robinson asked Baluyut to record an album's worth of material for release on Teenbeat, which Baluyut did under the name +/-. Influences on the project have included OMD, New Order, Shudder to Think and Tortoise.

The +/- debut album, Self-Titled Long-Playing Debut Album, was released on March 18, 2002. Although the album was essentially a Baluyut solo affair, he had formed a touring and recording band in mid-2001 before the album was released, with Versus drummer Patrick Ramos assuming guitar, keyboard and co-lead vocal duties, Chris Deaner on drums, and Margaret McCartney (formerly of Tuscadero) on bass. McCartney left in 2002 and the other members did not seek a permanent replacement. Since then the band has usually employed Tony Zanella of True Love Always as a tour bassist. Deaner was Kelly Clarkson's tour drummer from early 2007 to spring of 2008, during which time Karl Lundin (Deaner's partner in Loudest Boom Bah Yea) stood in for Deaner while he was on tour with Clarkson.

The group left Teenbeat in mid-2006 to sign to Absolutely Kosher, although Teenbeat did issue a long-delayed split EP with Bloodthirsty Butchers and a retrospective DVD of video clips in 2007. Subsequent to signing with Absolutely Kosher the band's recordings received distribution in central Europe through BB*Island, and the band has since toured Germany and its surrounding nations three times. After the release of Xs on Your Eyes in 2008 the group did not tour the US to any great extent, but concentrated their touring efforts on Asia and continental Europe. In late 2009 the band released the Japan-only EP Thrown into the Fire, and also announced that they had provided the soundtrack for the multiplayer online game Code of Everand, which Chris Deaner had worked on as a lead programmer.

== Members ==
- James Baluyut (vocals, guitar, keyboard, producer)
- Patrick Ramos (vocals, guitar, keyboard, drums)
- Chris Deaner (drums, sampler, banjo, clarinet, vibraphone, video production)

== Discography ==
=== Albums ===
- Self-Titled Long-Playing Debut Album (2002 – Teenbeat)
- You Are Here (2003 – Teenbeat / & / WWR Taiwan / BB Island)
- Let's Build a Fire (2006 – Absolutely Kosher / & / WWR Taiwan / BB Island)
- Xs on Your Eyes (2008 – Absolutely Kosher / & / BB Island)
- Jumping the Tracks (2014 – Teenbeat / &)
- Further Afield (2024 – Ernest Jenning / 7ep)

=== Compilations ===
- Pulled Punches (2010 – Teenbeat)

=== EPs ===
- Holding Patterns (2003 – Teenbeat / &)
- As Seen on Television (2004 – &)
- Bloodthirsty Butchers vs +/- Plus/Minus (2005 – Nippon Columbia / Teenbeat)
- Thrown into the Fire (2009 – &)
- Summer 2019: Extended Play (2019 – Ernest Jenning)

=== Soundtrack recordings ===
- Wicker Park Soundtrack – one track, "All I Do"
- Code of Everand MMOG Background music

== Videos ==
- Self Titled Debut Digital Video Disc (2007 – Teenbeat Records)
