= In Camera (band) =

English post-punk band

- Origin: London, England
- Genres: Post-punk
- Years active: 1978–1981
- Label: 4AD
- Past members: David Steiner; Andrew Gray; Pete Moore; Jeff Wilmott
- Website: In Camera on 4AD

In Camera were an English post-punk group, comprising David Steiner (vocals, keyboards), Andrew Gray (guitar), Pete Moore (bass), and Jeff Wilmott (drums), formed in London in 1978 and signed to the 4AD label. The band split in 1981 after releasing only one single and two EPs (the final one being released posthumously).

== Background ==
The seeds of the group were sown when youthful drummer Jeff Wilmott introduced aspiring bass guitar player Pete Moore to singer David Steiner; through this nucleus the addition of guitarist Andrew Gray became possible. After an incendiary performance at 'Billy's' in Soho, London opening for Bauhaus, In Camera were signed by that group's record label, 4AD.

In Camera released a 7" single, "Final Achievement"/"Die Laughing" in June 1980, followed six months later by the four-track EP IV Songs. Various gigs materialised throughout England, culminating at the end of 1980 in a John Peel session. This resulted in the release of the session on 12" as the EP Fin; the recording being the final vinyl document of the band before their non-acrimonious split in 1981.

=== Post-split ===
A retrospective, 13 (Lucky for Some), was released in 1992 on CD. All releases were on the 4AD label.

In March 2015, 4AD announced a pre-order for Era, an anthology of In Camera's pre-1981 material featuring previously unheard tracks, rehearsal tapes, live recordings and demos, via direct-to-fan platform PledgeMusic. Era was released in June 2015 on digital, 2xCD and 2xLP formats.

Andrew Gray went on to join the Wolfgang Press.

== Discography ==
=== Compilation albums ===
- 13 (Lucky for Some) (BAD 205 CD, August 1992)
- Era (DAD3508, June 2015)

=== EPs ===
- IV Songs (BAD 19, December 1980)
- Fin (BAD 205, April 1982)

=== Singles ===
- "Final Achievement"/"Die Laughing" (AD 8, June 1980)
