= Tuscadero =

American rock band

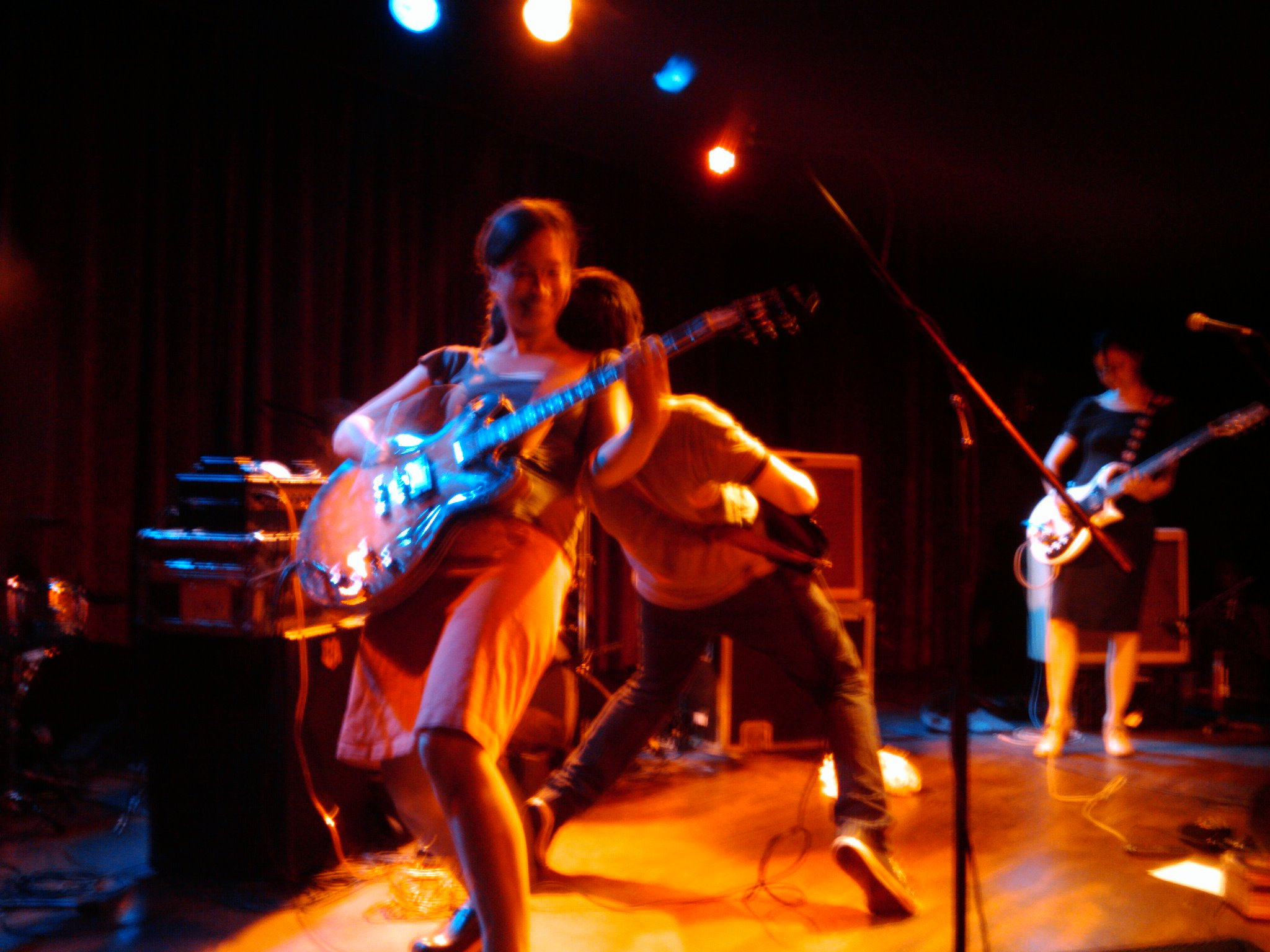
- Tuscadero playing a reunion show in 2010

Background information
- Origin: Washington, D.C.
- Genres: Indie rock
- Years active: 1993-1999
- Labels: Teenbeat, Elektra
- Past members: Melissa Farris; Margaret McCartney; Jack Hornady; Phil Satlof

Tuscadero was an American indie rock band from Washington, D.C., one of the most prominent on the TeenBeat Records roster.

== Biography ==
Melissa Farris and Margaret McCartney met while working at the Zig Zag Cafe in Washington, D.C. They founded Tuscadero on Halloween of 1993 with bassist Phil Satlof and drummer Jack Hornady. The band took its name from Suzi Quatro's Happy Days character Leather Tuscadero.

The band was signed with Mark Robinson of Teenbeat Records shortly after and released two EPs in the spring and summer of 1994: Mt. Pleasant and Angel in a Half Shirt. Their debut LP, The Pink Album, was released that fall, influenced by girl groups and the pop culture of its members' 1970s childhoods, such as board games and Nancy Drew. After touring with Sebadoh, the band signed with Elektra Records and re-recorded their debut album in 1995 with Mark Waterman, who had previously produced Elastica's debut.

Tuscadero's second album, My Way or the Highway, was released in 1998, and they toured with Cheap Trick to promote it, but after the album's release, Elektra dropped the band. Farris later founded the band Dame Fate with bassist Yalan Papillon, releasing one album, Time and Tide Wait for No Man, in 2002.

Tuscadero reunited in February 2005 for a one-off performance at TeenBeat's 20th anniversary celebration. They reunited once again in 2013 for the 20th anniversary of Washington, DC's Black Cat club. Two additional reunion shows were played in December 2014 as a benefit for a Teen-Beat Records intern who was facing mounting costs from leukemia.

Tuscadero reformed again in 2023 and played their first concerts since 2014 supporting Velocity Girl, who also reunited.

== Lineup ==
- Melissa Farris – vocals, guitar, organ
- Margaret McCartney – vocals, guitar
- Phil Satlof – bass guitar, piano
- Jack Hornady – drums

== Discography ==
- "Mount Pleasant" 7-inch (TeenBeat Records, April 1994)
- "Angel in a Half Shirt" 7-inch (TeenBeat Records, July 1994)
- The Pink Album (TeenBeat Records, November 1994 / Rereleased by Elektra Records, 1996)
- The Mark Robinson Remixes 7-inch (TeenBeat Records, March 1995)
- Step Into My Wiggle Room EP (TeenBeat Records, September 1995)
- "Tickled Pink" split 7-inch (with Jetlag) (Duchess Records, July 1996)
- My Way or the Highway (Elektra Records, May 1998)
- Live at Tramps 1996 New York City (via Bandcamp, September 2022)
