= Versus (band) =

American rock band

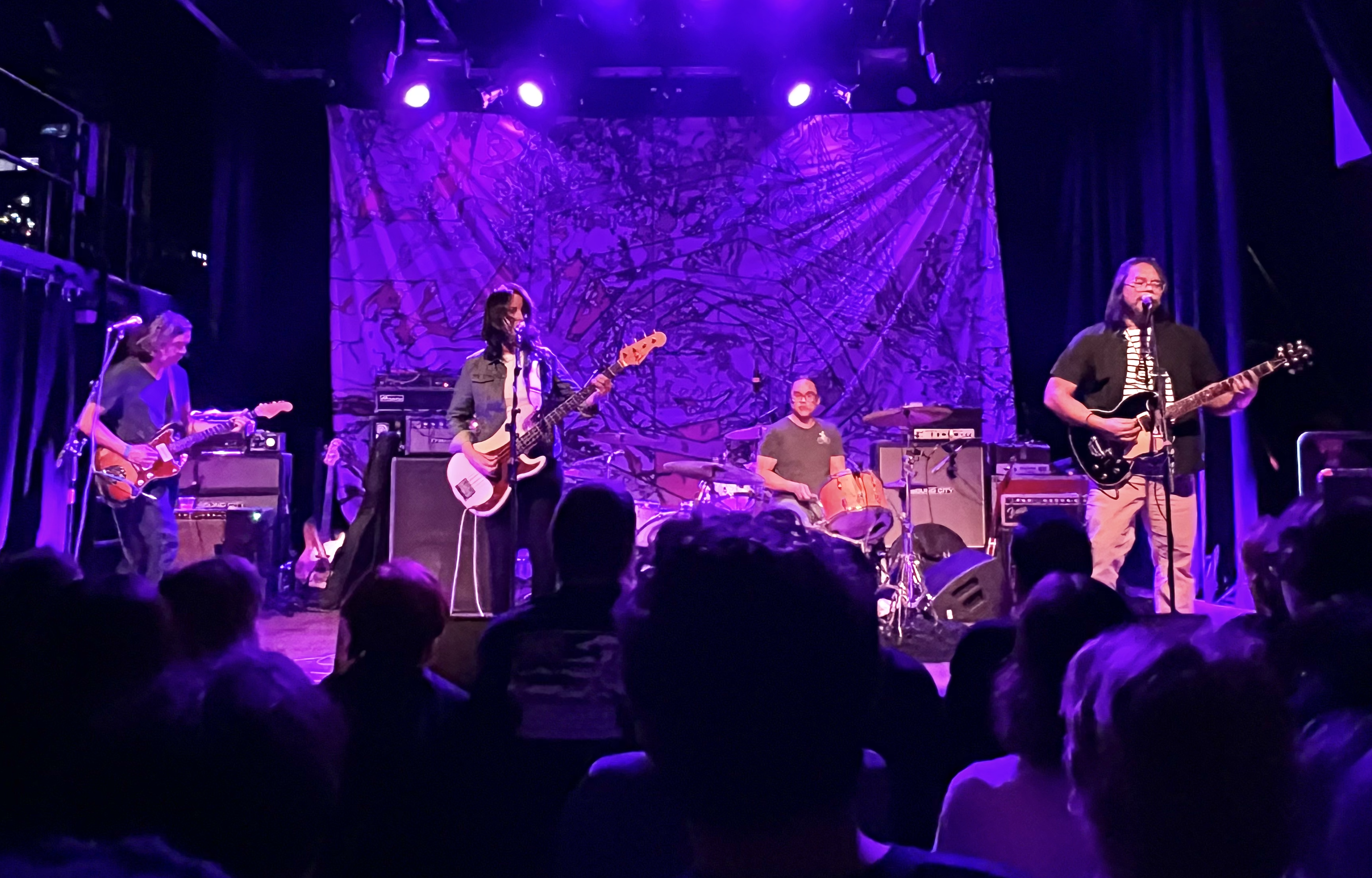
- Versus performing live in New York City

Background information
- Origin: New York City, U.S.
- Genres: Indie rock; noise rock
- Years active: 1990–2001, 2007–present
- Labels: TeenBeat, Caroline, Merge
- Spinoffs: +/-
- Members: Richard Baluyut; Fontaine Toups; Edward Baluyut; Margaret White
- Past members: Robert Hale; James Baluyut; Patrick Ramos

Versus is an American indie rock band formed in New York City in 1990 by vocalist and guitarist Richard Baluyut, bassist Fontaine Toups and drummer Edward Baluyut. Richard Baluyut and Toups remained the two core members throughout the band's history. The band was noted for their marriage of indie pop songwriting and vocal harmonies to the "loud-soft" dynamics of grunge and alternative rock. They were also noted for their proficient and disciplined musicianship and for their credo of "meat, sports, and rock", none of which had much currency in the early 1990s American indie scene. The band was named after the Mission of Burma album Vs.

Versus has counted at least two and sometimes three of the Filipino-American Baluyut brothers as members throughout its existence. The New York Times listed Versus as one of the most prominent 1990s American indie rock bands featuring Asian American members. The band has been signed to TeenBeat Records, Caroline Records and Merge Records.

The band broke up in 2001 but reunited in 2007 and in 2009, released their first album in a decade. After another lengthy break, the band released their sixth album Ex Voto in 2019, their first in nine years.

== History ==
The Baluyut brothers grew up in Bloomfield Hills, Michigan and formed the band with friends after Richard moved to New York for college. Before Versus, Richard Baluyut formed the band Flower in 1986, while Edward Baluyut and Fontaine Toups formed Saturnine in 1990, a band which only lasted for two months. The band signed to TeenBeat Records and released their debut album The Stars Are Insane in 1994, originally titled Meat, Sports and Rock. The band also made an appearance in the 1994 cult road movie Half-cocked.

In 1995, the third Baluyut brother James joined the band, which expanded into a quartet. That year, the band toured with Seam, aMiniature and Venus Cures All, all bands featuring Asian American members, on the Ear of the Dragon tour. Versus also played Lollapalooza's second stage in August 1995 alongside acts including Hum, Beck, Blonde Redhead and the Roots. On TeenBeat, Versus also released the compilation Dead Leaves in 1995 and the EP Deep Red in 1996.

Now on Caroline Records, Versus released their second studio album Secret Swingers in 1996 (named after a Henry Kissinger quote) and their third album Two Cents Plus Tax in 1998. Drummer Edward Baluyut left the band in 1996 and was replaced by Patrick Ramos. Then, Versus signed to Merge Records to release the EPs Afterglow (1999) and Shangri-La (2000), as well as their fourth album Hurrah (2000). The album Hurrah was inspired by the closing of Detroit's Tiger Stadium.

The band still continued to tour occasionally, including dates opening for Sleater-Kinney on The Hot Rock tour, but began a recording hiatus in 2001 after it broke up for a short period and Richard Baluyut relocated to San Francisco. The members afterwards moved on to other bands: James Baluyut and Patrick Ramos formed +/-, Fontaine Toups formed The Fontaine Toups and Richard Baluyut converted his solo acoustic project Whysall Lane into a full band. Former member Edward Baluyut formed and played in the Pacific Ocean from 1996 to 2003.

=== Reunion ===
After a prolonged period of inactivity, playing just one show in the preceding three years, Versus played a private warm-up show in November 2007 and opened for Yo La Tengo at a Hanukkah show on December 4, 2007. At that point, Richard Baluyut had recently returned to live in New York City, both TFT and Whysall Lane had broken up, and +/- was temporarily on hold while member Chris Deaner was touring as part of Kelly Clarkson's live band. Versus opened for Love Is All at the Bowery Ballroom in June 2008 as a three-piece with Ed Baluyut on drums. The band played as a four-piece with James Baluyut and Patrick Ramos when they toured Japan with +/- in late 2008, but in June 2009, the Versus MySpace page announced that Edward Baluyut had rejoined as a longtime member and that James and Patrick had left the group. The group began recording a new album that month, and started performing as a four-piece band with Margaret White on violin and keyboards. The band released On the Ones and Threes on Merge Records in August 2010, their first album in 10 years. To promote the album, Versus toured with Polvo and Superchunk.

The band were chosen by Jeff Mangum of Neutral Milk Hotel to perform at the All Tomorrow's Parties festival that he curated in 2012 in Minehead, England. They played the third annual Hopscotch Music Festival in Raleigh, North Carolina, which took place September 6–8, 2012. They were joined onstage by Mac McCaughan of Superchunk for several Neutral Milk Hotel songs and by Kurt Wagner for a Lambchop song. Versus played 2017 Riot Fest in Chicago, chosen for the lineup by headliners Jawbreaker, as Jawbreaker drummer Adam Pfahler played in Whysall Lane with Richard Baluyut.

In May 2019, the band released the Ex Nihilo EP and followed it up with Ex Voto in August, their first album in nine years.

Versus opened for Jawbox's For Your Own Special Sweetheart show in July 2022 at New York City's (Le) Poisson Rouge. Versus were announced as Unwound's opening act for their March 11, 2023 show in New York City's Irving Plaza. On October 7, 2023, Versus opened for Guided by Voices in Jersey City's White Eagle Hall.

== Members ==
=== Current members ===
- Richard Baluyut – guitar, vocals (1990–present)
- Fontaine Toups – bass guitar, guitar, vocals (1990–present)
- Edward Baluyut – guitar (1990–1991); drums (1992–1996, 2008–present)
- Margaret White – violin, keyboards (2009–present)

=== Former members ===
- Robert Hale – drums (1991–1992)
- James Baluyut – guitar, keyboards (1995–2008)
- Patrick Ramos – drums (1996–2008)

== Discography ==
=== Studio albums ===
- The Stars Are Insane [cd] TeenBeat Records 1994
- Secret Swingers [cd] Caroline Records 1996
- Two Cents Plus Tax [cd] Caroline Records 1998
- Hurrah [cd/lp] Merge Records 2000
- On the Ones and Threes [cd/lp] Merge Records 2010
- Ex Voto [cd/lp] Ernest Jenning Record Co. 2019

=== EPs ===
- Let's Electrify [cd-ep] Remora 1993
- Deep Red [cd-ep] TeenBeat Records 1996
- Afterglow [cd-ep] Merge Records 1999
- Shangri-La [cd5] Merge Records 2000
- Drawn and Quartered [cd-ep] Insound Tour Support Series 2000
- Ex Nihilo [12-inch] Ernest Jenning Record Co. 2019

=== Compilations ===
- Dead Leaves [cd] TeenBeat Records 1995

=== Singles ===
- "Insomnia/Astronaut" [7-inch] Land Speed 1992
- "Bright Light/Forest Fire" [7-inch] Pop Narcotic 1992
- "Tin Foil Star" on January Working Holiday [7-inch] split single with Scrawl Simple Machines 1993
- "Frog/Go Tell It on the Mountain" [7-inch] K Records 1994
- "Big Head On/N.I.T.A." [7-inch] TeenBeat Records 1994
- "Yeah You" [7-inch/cd5] (UK only) Caroline Records 1996
- "Glitter of Love" [7-inch/cd5] (UK only) Caroline Records 1996
- "Oriental American" (TEENBEAT 272 – 1998)

=== Compilation appearances ===
- "Another Face" on Stars Kill Rock compilation LP Kill Rock Stars 1993
- "Tin Foil Star" and "Hacienda" (live) on Working Holiday! comp. [cd] Simple Machines 1994
- "Crazy" on A Day in the Park comp. [cd] The Now Sound 1994
- "Sunburned (Life's a Beach)" on Why Do You Think They Call It Pop? – The Pop Narcotic Compilation comp. double [10-inch] Pop Narcotic 1994
- "Know Nothing" on "Wakefield: The TeenBeat Story Vol. 1 / 1992–1994: A TeenBeat Sampler" TeenBeat Records 1994
- "Big Head On" on "Wakefield: The TeenBeat Story Vol. 3 / 1986–1995: Superstars on 45" TeenBeat Records 1995
- "Reveille" on Ear of the Dragon: 19 Asian American Bands comp. [cd] Fortune 5 Records 1995
- "Twenty Four Hours" on A Means to an End (The Music of Joy Division) comp. [cd] Hut Recordings 1996
- "Forest Fires" on More of Our Stupid Noise [cd] Squirtgun Records 1996
- "Frog" on Project Echo [cd] K Records 1996
- "White Power Porch" on "1997 TeenBeat Sampler" [cd] TeenBeat Records 1997
- "Sunlight Flier" on Selector Dub Narcotic comp. [cd] K Records 1998
- "Forest Fires (live)" on More of Our Stupid Noise '98 [cd] Squirtgun Records 1998
- "Mercury" on "1998 TeenBeat Sampler" [cd] TeenBeat Records 1998
- "We Got The Missiles" on "1999 TeenBeat Sampler" [cd] TeenBeat Records 1999
- "Underground (Gallery Redux)" on "2000 TeenBeat Sampler" [cd] TeenBeat Records 2000
- "Blue Again (F.T.)" and "Blue Again (Ricardo)" on "2002 TeenBeat Sampler" [cd] TeenBeat Records 2002

=== Soundtrack appearances ===
- The Dhamma Brothers One song, "Crazy-maker"
- Midas' Son Two songs, "Said Too Much" and "Ghost Story". Also original score by Richard Baluyut.
- "B-9," Half-Cocked soundtrack (CD only)
