= TeenBeat Records =

American independent record label

Teen-Beat
- Founded: 1984
- Founder: Mark Robinson
- Country of origin: United States
- Official website: teenbeat.net

Teen Beat is an American independent record label, originally based in Arlington, Virginia, now based in Cambridge, Massachusetts. It was founded by Mark Robinson (of Unrest) in 1984 at Wakefield High School, along with Phil Krauth (of Unrest), Andrew Beaujon (of Eggs), Tim Moran (of Unrest), and Ian Zack (Thirsty Boys).

== History ==
In 1984, when Mark Robinson was in high school, he started the label as a kind of lending library. Only one copy of each album existed and his classmates could borrow one for a few days. The albums were mostly unedited rehearsals of Robinson's band Unrest. They were not numbered but lettered (A, B, C, etc.). Only one of these early albums is known to still exist: Unrest's This Side, Numskull; catalogue number "J" (the 10th TeenBeat release); dated December 14, 1984.

The first public release was a compilation cassette called Extremism In the Defense of Liberty is No Vice on February 23, 1985. This was catalog number "TeenBeat 1". This audiocassette was dubbed into multiple copies by Andrew (Riley) Beaujon and Mark Robinson, by hooking up two separate cassette machines.

Robinson's original intention was to release music from the local area, inspired by Dischord Records. Before the label had any distribution deal Robinson would leave a few cassettes at records stores when he visited different cities.

== Style ==
As with its influence Factory Records, Teen Beat prominently numbered its releases, with some releases known only by catalog number (e.g., the TEENBEAT 100 compilation, 1993); numbers have also been assigned to non-musical items, including T-shirts, coffee mugs, events, its offices, and interns.

== List of Teen-Beat bands ==
Teen Beat (or "Teen-Beat" or "Teenbeat") has been home to a number of prominent indie bands, including Unrest, +/-, Versus, Gastr del Sol, Eggs, Aden, True Love Always and a large number of other bands and side projects. Along with Dischord Records, TeenBeat was an important early independent label; while Dischord focused on punk and hardcore, TeenBeat's bands were more typically guitar-based "indie-pop". Both labels almost exclusively work with bands from the Washington, D.C. area.

- Aden
- Air Miami
- Autoclave
- The Ballet
- Bastro
- Andrew Beaujon
- Bells Of
- Blast Off Country Style
- Bloodthirsty Butchers
- Mark Borthwick/hollAnd
- Bossanova
- Bratmobile
- Bridget/Kathi/Doug
- Cath Carroll
- Justin Chearno
- Tha Cheeky Bastid
- Circus Lupus
- Clarence
- Cobalt
- Jonny Cohen
- Containe
- Cotton Candy
- Crispy Ambulance
- Currituck Co.
- Draw the Kitten
- Dustdevils
- DVS
- Eggs
- The Feminine Complex
- Flin Flon
- Flowers of Discipline
- Flying Saucer
- The Fontaine Toups/TFT
- Fred & Ginger
- Gastr del Sol
- Gene Ween
- The Gollipopps
- Grenadine
- Helter Skillet
- Kevin Hewick
- hollAnd
- horse ing two=HIT
- Hot Pursuit
- In Camera
- In Interview
- Jungle George & The Plague
- The Krokodiloes
- K-Stars
- Phil Krauth
- The Last Wave
- Latin Hustle
- The Long Goodbye
- Los Marauders
- Loudest Boom Bah Yea
- Lu
- Barbara Manning
- Mark E. Superstar
- Maybe It's Reno
- Mirah & Ginger
- MMM's Live Archive
- The Naysayer
- Nethers
- New Carrollton
- No Trend
- Olympic Death Squad
- The Pacific Ocean
- Panax
- +/- {Plus/Minus}
- Pocket Rockets
- The Positions
- Que Verde
- Rhonda Harris
- Rive Gauche
- Mark Robinson
- Romania
- The Rondelles
- The Ropers
- Scaley Andrew
- Robert Schipul/Ascension
- The Screamer
- S.C.U.D.
- Section 25
- Sexual Milkshake
- Sharky Favorite
- Tracy Shedd
- Sisterhood of Convoluted Thinkers
- Sprites
- Stereolab
- Stick Insect
- The Still
- Subject to Change
- Superconductor
- Synthetic Socks
- Juliet Swango
- Teenage Gang Debs
- Tel Aviv
- Thirsty Boys
- True Love Always
- The Tube Bar
- Tuscadero
- Uncle Wiggly
- Unrest
- Velocity Girl
- Versus
- Viva Satellite!
- Volumia
- Vomit Launch
- Wall Drug
- Whysall Lane
- William & Vivian
- Butch Willis
- Naomi Wolff
- Jeff & Robert Zitofsky

== See also ==
- List of independent record labels
- Teenbeat discography
