= 2017 Webby Awards =

US internet awards ceremony

The 21st annual Webby Awards were held at Cipriani Wall Street in New York City on May 15, 2017, which was hosted by comedian and actor Joel McHale. The Webby Awards have been dubbed the "internet's highest honor" and, in 2017, received nearly 13,000 entries from 70 countries.

== Winners ==
(from http://webbyawards.com/winners/2017/)

Category	Sub-Category	Webby Award Winner	People's Voice winner	Other Nominees
Special Achievement	Lifetime Achievement	Internet Archive		
Special Achievement	Artist of the Year	Solange Knowles		
Special Achievement	Social Movement of the Year	Women's March		
Special Achievement	Best Actress	Gillian Anderson		
Special Achievement	Best Actor	Steve Buscemi		
Special Achievement	Special Achievement	Van Jones		
Special Achievement	Agency of the Year	BBDO New York		
Web	Activism	Women's Footprint in History by UN Women and Elkanodata	Shout Your Abortion by Civilization (Design Practice)	Global Gender Gap Report Browser by TWO-N Inc.
Web	Activism	Women's Footprint in History by UN Women and Elkanodata	Shout Your Abortion by Civilization (Design Practice)	My Grandmother's Lingo by SBS
Web	Activism	Women's Footprint in History by UN Women and Elkanodata	Shout Your Abortion by Civilization (Design Practice)	Make It OK by Preston Kelly
Web	Art	Heilbrunn Timeline of Art History by The Metropolitan Museum of Art	The Garden of Earthly Delights by Jheronimus Bosch by Q42, NTR, Fabrique & Pieter Huystee Film	
Web	Associations	Vera Institute of Justice by Hyperakt	The United State of Video Games by E3	
Web	Best Individual Editorial Experience	Voices From Standing Rock by The Washington Post		
Web	Best Practices	VirginAmerica.com by Virgin Atlantic, Work & Co	WIRED Ad Free by Condé Nast	
Web	Best Visual Design - Aesthetic	iFly50.com by KLM Royal Dutch Airlines, Born05		
Online Film & Video	Music Video	Coldplay – Up&Up by Prettybird	Beyoncé – Formation by Prettybird	DJ Shadow feat. Run the Jewels – Nobody Speak by Pulse Films
Online Film & Video	Music Video	Coldplay – Up&Up by Prettybird	Beyoncé – Formation by Prettybird	Miike Snow – Genghis Khan by Pulse Films
Online Film & Video	Music Video	Coldplay – Up&Up by Prettybird	Beyoncé – Formation by Prettybird	OK Go – The One Moment by Ogilvy & Mather
Online Film & Video	Animation	“Are You Lost in the World Like Me?” by Moby and the Void Pacific Choir (illustration by Steve Cutts)		
Online Film & Video	Variety	"We the Internet TV"	"Movie Accent Expert Breaks Down Actors' Accents" by Wired	
Online Film & Video	Video Remixes/Mashups	"Kendrick Lamar/Rick and Morty Mashup" by Mylo the Cat		
Mobile Sites & Apps	Best Streaming Video	HBO Now by HBO		Radio Garden by Studio Puckey & Moniker
Mobile Sites & Apps	Best Streaming Video	HBO Now by HBO		Pandora
Mobile Sites & Apps	Best Streaming Video	HBO Now by HBO		Bumpers
Mobile Sites & Apps	Best Streaming Video	HBO Now by HBO		Overcast
Mobile Sites & Apps	Games	Pokémon Go by Niantic, Inc.	The Walking Dead No Man's Land Mobile Game by AMC Networks	Dots & Co by Dots
Mobile Sites & Apps	Games	Pokémon Go by Niantic, Inc.	The Walking Dead No Man's Land Mobile Game by AMC Networks	Star Wars Arcade by Goodboy Digital and Disney EMEA
Mobile Sites & Apps	Games	Pokémon Go by Niantic, Inc.	The Walking Dead No Man's Land Mobile Game by AMC Networks	NBA LIVE Mobile by Electronic Arts
Social	Music	Mark Ronson – The Official Cover by McCann London	Album+Art by Eisen Bernardo	#beckWOW Instagram Campaign by Capitol Records
Social	Music	Mark Ronson – The Official Cover by McCann London	Album+Art by Eisen Bernardo	StreetMusicMap Instagram by StreetMusicMap
Social	Music	Mark Ronson – The Official Cover by McCann London	Album+Art by Eisen Bernardo	Rolling Stone Instagram by Rolling Stone
Podcasts	Arts & Culture	Still Processing	Stuff You Should Know	
Podcasts	Best Host	Beautiful Stories from Anonymous People	99% Invisible	
Podcasts	Best Individual Episode	"Is the Internet Being Ruined?" (Ep. 253) from Freakonomics Radio	"My Little Hundred Million" (S1-E6) from Revisionist History with Malcolm Gladwell	
Podcasts	Best Sound Design/ Original Music Score	Secrets, Crimes & Audiotape: Wait Wait Don’t Kill Me Series	Undisclosed: The Music	
Podcasts	Best Writing	How to Be a Girl	Stuff You Missed in History Class	
Podcasts	Comedy	The Hilarious World of Depression	The Last Podcast On The Left	
Podcasts	Documentary	The Kitchen Sisters Present	Missing Richard Simmons	
Podcasts	Drama	Homecoming		
Podcasts	Interview/Talk Show	Another Round		
Podcasts	Lifestyle	Women of the Hour	The Sporkful	
Podcasts	News & Information	"Voting rights – and wrongs" episode from Reveal	FiveThirtyEight Politics Podcast	
Podcasts	Recaps	Masterpiece Studio		
Podcasts	Science & Education	Hidden Brain	Waking Up with Sam Harris	
Podcasts	Sports	The Bill Simmons Podcast		
Podcasts	Technology	Leo Laporte talks with Edward Snowden's Lawyer	Codebreaker	
Advertising, Media & PR	Data Driven Media	Doctors of the World	I'm Moving to Canada	
