= WMUC-FM =

Student radio station of the University of Maryland

- College Park, Maryland; United States
- Frequency: 90.5 MHz
- Branding: WMUC-FM

Programming
- Format: Freeform

Ownership
- Owner: University of Maryland
- Sister stations: WMUC Digital (online)

History
- First air date: September 10, 1979
- Call sign meaning: Maryland University Communications

Technical information
- Licensing authority: FCC
- Facility ID: 69019
- Class: D
- ERP: 30 watts
- HAAT: 4 meters (13 ft)
- Transmitter coordinates: 38°58′59″N 76°56′38″W

Links
- Public license information: Public file; LMS
- Website: wmuc.umd.edu

WMUC-FM (90.5 FM) is the student-run non-commercial radio station licensed to the University of Maryland in College Park, Maryland, broadcasting at 30 watts. It is a freeform radio station staffed entirely by volunteer UMD students and community members.

== Broadcast coverage ==
WMUC can be heard on 90.5 FM in College Park and Hyattsville, in parts of Washington, D.C. and Silver Spring, and many of the surrounding communities. It is also streamed on the internet at its website and through the WMUC Radio app.

== History ==
WMUC had its first beginning in 1942 when student-run Old Line Network began daily broadcasts. Gilbert Cullen, with the help of George Reynolds, built the first University of Maryland campus radio station. Broadcasts were limited to the campus, transmitted by carrier current, so the station did not require an FCC license to operate. This became the fifth student-run campus station on the east coast. However, the station shut down January 1943 when most of its technical personnel were enlisted in the armed forces. The station re-launched in January using the call letters WMUC. The first WMUC broadcast aired October 11, 1948, but was shut down three days later due to transmission issues. The station relocated from the Speech Department to Silvester Hall in spring 1950, but in the fall, relocated again to a renovated shower stall in Calvert Hall where it remained until 1953. In 1953, WMUC moved to the old Journalism building (better known as Temporary Building FF) in a low-lying area of campus called "the gulch," where it stayed for over 20 years. Finally, the station relocated to the third floor of South Campus Dining Hall in fall 1974, where it currently resides.

WMUC received its FM license for 88.1 MHz in 1979 after a two-year "FM or Bust" campaign, airing as a 10-watt FM station for the first time on September 10, 1979. It adopted the freeform format in 1982 so DJs could promote underground artists and music that is under-represented by commercial radio. WMUC(AM) 650 remained Top-40.

WMUC(AM) gained credibility in the Washington, D.C. radio broadcasting job market, providing announcers and managerial talent to many local stations. Though primarily funded by student fees, it also generated revenue through advertising of local and national concerns. In this era, WMUC "acquired its first news network affiliation, saw Anne Edwards appointed as the first female station manager and, in 1965, was selected by the Intercollegiate Broadcasting System to receive the 'All-American College Radio Station' Award", as recounted in the university's archives. In the mid-70s, programming broadened to include shows aimed at black and minority students and promoting feminism. Waning listenership and increasing maintenance of the campus-only carrier-current transmission system caused the shutdown of the AM in 1999. In its place, the online service WMUC Digital was created.

In 2012, the University Libraries' establishment of the Digital Conversion and Media Reformatting Center (DCMR) facilitated the process of archiving and digitizing the station schedules, staff lists, policies, forms, flyers, zines, photos, awards, correspondence, reports, newspaper clippings, and manuals. The WMUC Collection is now a "permanent and growing part of the University Archives" and is available for public research. "Saving College Radio: WMUC Past, Present, and Future" was exhibited in Hornbake Library from September 2013 to July 2014.

=== Interference from WJHU/WYPR ===
WMUC-FM's original operation was on 88.1 MHz. At the time, WJHU at Johns Hopkins University also operated as a 10-watt Class D station on the same frequency. The two low-wattage stations did not interfere with each other.

In 1983, WJHU (now WYPR) was granted approval to upgrade to a Class B1 25-kilowatt signal to cover the entire Baltimore metropolitan area. Class D stations are considered secondary and not entitled to interference protection from higher station classes, but may not themselves cause interference to other stations.

The Washington–Baltimore FM band is congested enough that WMUC could not move to another frequency within the non-commercial reserved band (88.1–91.9 MHz), as there were none available that would satisfy the rules. Anticipating the potential issue, the station filed two applications in 1984 and 1986 to move to 87.9 MHz, which had been opened to Class D stations if no other frequencies were available in 1978. The FCC placed strict separation rules on such applications due to additional interference concerns: 87.9 MHz is not part of the FM band but instead part of TV channel 6 and, in the age of analog TV, was very close to its designated sound carrier of 87.75 MHz. WMUC was too close to both Philadelphia's WPVI-TV and Richmond, Virginia's WTVR-TV to comply with the limit, and both applications were dismissed.

Thus, WMUC was forced to tolerate the interference from WJHU/WYPR, which was so great that it rendered the station unlistenable even on parts of campus.

However, higher-class stations may voluntarily waive their interference protection. In 2021, the University of Maryland reached an agreement with C-SPAN (owner of WCSP-FM, on 90.1 MHz) and WETA (on 90.9 MHz), to accept any interference caused by WMUC if it moved to 90.5 MHz. It also took the opportunity to increase from 10 to 30 watts. The new signal launched in late 2022.

== Programming ==
WMUC-FM is true freeform radio, where the DJs themselves determine the programming of the station. An elected student Program Director assigns weekly time slots on the station to individual DJs, who are then responsible for programming, hosting, and promoting their respective shows. The schedule changes each semester, with the goal of offering a fresh perspective and diverse lineup of music and talk shows created by students at the University of Maryland.

In 2008, WMUC launched WMUC-2, now WMUC Digital, a separate internet-only radio station which, like WMUC-FM, features freeform music and talk programming. Intended as a "proving ground" for new DJs, WMUC Digital also features programs which may not be appropriate for broadcast under FCC rules.

WMUC also has an active Sports department, which maintains its own website and internet stream. WMUC Sports features a regular schedule of talk radio shows as well as on-air play-by-play and color analysis of Maryland sporting events. Calling 10 different sports, WMUC Sports is the primary carrier of Maryland men's soccer, women's basketball, baseball, women's lacrosse, field hockey, and softball.

In the past, WMUC had an active News department, which was integrated with the former Radio Television and Film department at the University of Maryland. WMUC's news programming is now student run. The programming is divided into two segments: Weekly Roundup, the flagship news show featuring original reporting on top campus, national and DMV area news; and Drop the Pop, the featured talk show covering all things pop culture, politics, entertainment and more.

=== Live music ===
WMUC has a weekly live music program called Third Rail Radio (named after the electrically charged third rail of the DC Metro system), started in 1996 by Eric Speck. Third Rail Radio hosts many local and traveling independent bands and musicians. In 2004, the program produced a compilation CD of artists who have appeared on the program.

In addition to Third Rail Radio, many in-studio performances or interviews have occurred. Notable musicians who have performed or been interviewed on WMUC include Louis Armstrong, Linda Ronstadt, The Kingston Trio, Don McLean, the Ramones, Duran Duran, Braid, Elizabeth Cotten, Fats Domino, Elliott Smith, the Get Up Kids, Jay-Z, Rites of Spring, the Faith, and Peter, Paul, & Mary. Since 2000, that list also includes Beach House, Future Islands, Logic, Matt & Kim, King Tuff, Kurt Vile, Vivian Girls, Alvvays, Surfer Blood, Q and Not U, and Mitski have performed at WMUC.

== Notable alumni ==
- Bonnie Bernstein, sportscaster
- Joe Bonomo, essayist and music writer
- Sharon Cheslow, musician, artist, writer
- John Davis, drummer of Q and Not U, singer in Georgie James and Title Tracks
- Mark Davis, radio talk show host, KSKY Dallas-Ft. Worth, columnist, Dallas Morning News
- Connie Chung, TV news anchor
- Len Elmore, sportscaster and former Maryland and NBA basketball player
- Skip Groff, record producer, disc jockey, and record store owner
- Jay Kernis, radio and television producer, co-founder of NPR's Morning Edition and Weekend Edition
- Jeff Krulik, documentary film director (Heavy Metal Parking Lot)
- R. Edward "Bob" Lopez, newsman and radio personality
- Mark McEwen, television and radio personality
- Aaron McGruder, creator of The Boondocks comic strip and TV show
- Dave Nada, DJ, producer, and creator of the moombahton genre of electronic dance music
- Mark Robinson, indie rock musician and founder of TeenBeat Records and the band Unrest
- Peter Rosenberg, American radio disc jockey and television show host
- Valerie Solanas, radical feminist and subject of the film, I Shot Andy Warhol
- Erin Smith, guitarist of Bratmobile

== See also ==
- Campus radio
- List of college radio stations in the United States
