= Burn to Shine (DVD series) =

Burn to Shine is a series of films created by Trixie Film starting in 2004. The company is a collaboration between filmmaker Christoph Green and ex-Fugazi drummer Brendan Canty. The filmmakers select a house that is set to be demolished in a certain city and ask a member of a local band to curate the event. In one day they shoot all of the selected bands giving each band an hour to set up and perform with no overdubs or corrections. They document the house's history and subsequent demolition, creating bookends for the performances on the release. As of August 2017, six volumes have been recorded.

== Screenings ==
On March 2, 2016, Matador Records announced volume six, shot in Atlanta, would be screened as part of an Algiers tour.

== Series information ==
=== Volume 1: Washington, D.C. 01.14.2004 ===
Volume 1 cover featuring Ted Leo

Curated by: Brendan Canty

1. Q and Not U - "X-Polynation"
2. Medications - "Domestic Animals"
3. Garland of Hours - "Words Versus"
4. French Toast - "Insane"
5. Ted Leo - "Bleeding Powers"
6. Weird War - "AK-47"
7. The Evens - "Mount Pleasant Isn't"
8. Bob Mould - "Hoover Dam" (Sugar song)

=== Volume 2: Chicago, IL 09.13.2004 ===
Volume 2 cover

Curated by: Bob Weston

1. The Lonesome Organist - "Catching Flies With Teeth"
2. Pit Er Pat - "The Bog Man"
3. Shellac - "Steady As She Goes"
4. The Ponys - "Shadow Box"
5. Wilco - "Muzzle of Bees"
6. Tight Phantomz - "Ninja Talk"
7. Freakwater - "Jewel"
8. Red Eyed Legends - "Je M'appelle Macho"
9. Tortoise - "Salt the Skies"

=== Volume 3: Portland, OR 06.15.2005 ===
Volume 3 cover featuring Sleater Kinney

Curated by: Chris Funk

1. The Thermals - "Welcome to the Planet"
2. Quasi - "Peace and Love"
3. The Planet The - "Look of a Woman"
4. Mirah - "Light the Match"
5. Sleater-Kinney - "Modern Girl"
6. The Ready - "For All You Know"
7. The Lifesavas - "The Warning"
8. The Shins - "Saint Simon"
9. The Decemberists - "The Mariner's Revenge Song"
10. Wet Confetti - "Take My Advice"
11. The Gossip - "Listen Up!"
12. "Bonus" track: Tom Heinl - "Christmas Tree on Fire"

=== Volume 4: Louisville, KY ===
Curated by: William Benton of Lucky Pineapple.

1. Dead Child
2. Ultra Pulverize
3. Will Oldham
4. Magik Markers
5. Lords
6. Verktum
7. Commonwealth
8. Shipping News
9. Liberation Prophecy
10. Parlour
11. Lucky Pineapple.

=== Volume 5: Seattle, WA 01.27.2007 ===
Volume 5 cover

Curated by: Benjamin Gibbard

1. Spook the Horse - "Another New Year"
2. Harvey Danger - "Little Round Mirrors"
3. Tiny Vipers - "On This Side"
4. Blue Scholars - "Morning of America"
5. Dave Bazan - "Cold Beer and Cigarettes"
6. Benjamin Gibbard - "Broken Yolk in Western Sky"
7. Eddie Vedder - "Can't Keep" (Pearl Jam song)
8. Minus the Bear - "Arctic Knights"
9. The Cave Singers - "Called"
10. The Long Winters - "Departure"
11. Kinski - "Crybaby Blowout"
12. The Can't See - "Barfight"
13. Triumph of Lethargy Skinned Alive to Death - "Big Bed"
14. Jesse Sykes and the Sweet Hereafter - "The Air is Thin"

=== Volume 6: Atlanta, GA July 29, 2007 ===
Curated by: Lee Tesche of Algiers. Released online April 2016.

1. Shannon Wright - "Black Little Stray"
2. The Selmanaires - "Selmanaire Rock"
3. The Liverhearts - "Ornament"
4. Deerhunter - "Wash Off"
5. Black Lips - "I Saw a Ghost (Lean)"
6. Delia Gartrell - "See What You Done, Done (Hymn No. 9)"
7. The Mighty Hannibal - "Get in the Groove"
8. The Carbonas - "Assvogel"
9. The Coathangers - "Wreckless Boy"
10. The All Night Drug Prowling Wolves - "What to Do"
11. Snowden - "Innocent Heathen"
12. Mastodon - "Sleeping Giant"
