= Light Beams =

Light Beams may refer to:

- Light beams, directional projections of light energy
- Light Beams, a music group with Justin Moyer
- "Light Beams", a song by Tove Lo from the 2017 album Blue Lips
