= Mickey and Amelia =

Mickey, Amelia & Spiegel
- Other names: Mickey & Amelia, 98 Rock Morning Show
- Genre: Hot talk
- Country of origin: United States
- Language: English
- Home station: WIYY
- Starring: Mickey Cucchiella; Amelia Ryerse; Josh Spiegel
- Produced by: Scott Reardon
- Original release: February 17, 2003 – July 5, 2013

Mickey, Amelia & Spiegel was a local radio show that broadcast out of Baltimore, Maryland, on WIYY, 98Rock (97.9 FM). The morning show ran Monday through Friday from 5:30AM-10AM, starring Mickey Cucchiella, Amelia Ryerse and Josh Spiegel with their producer Scott Reardon. On July 8, 2013 the show was replaced with Justin, Scott, and Spiegel.

== Staff ==
- Mickey Cucchiella: Host, comedian
- Amelia Ryerse: Co-Host
- Josh Spiegel: Co-Host, News
- Scott Reardon: Producer (2004–present)
- Greg Hood: Assistant Producer
- Keith Mills: Sports

== Broadcast history ==
Baltimore comedian Mickey Cucchiella had been a regular guest on 98Rock's morning show when he signed on to co-host the station's evening show in early 2002. He debuted with co-host Jennifer Wagner in March 2002. Wagner left in late 2002 and Mickey continued to host the show with Producer Don Koenig. In February 2003, Amelia Ryerse became the show's new co-host.

Mickey and Amelia took over the afternoon drive time show in early 2004, a move aimed to put 98Rock in direct competition with Don and Mike (carried on Live 105.7). At that time, Producer Don Koenig was dropped.

The show was moved to the mornings in 2003 and later renamed Mickey, Amelia, and Spiegel as the morning show on October 30, 2006, after Lopez died, and following the departure of Kirk McEwen and Mark Ondayko.

On May 4, 2012, there was an incident wherein Mickey accidentally fried the studio's mixing board by knocking over a coffee cup.

On June 28, 2013, Mickey Cucchiella announced that he was leaving the morning show

July 8, 2013 the new station line-up was revealed. Justin Schlegel joined the morning show team, while Amelia Ryerse moved back to the afternoon drive. Scott Reardon also made a transition from Producer to On-Air Talent, leaving Mike Anderson to back-fill his production position. The new morning show is named after the three on-air personalities - Justin, Scott and Spiegel.
