= Joel McHale =

American actor and comedian (born 1971)

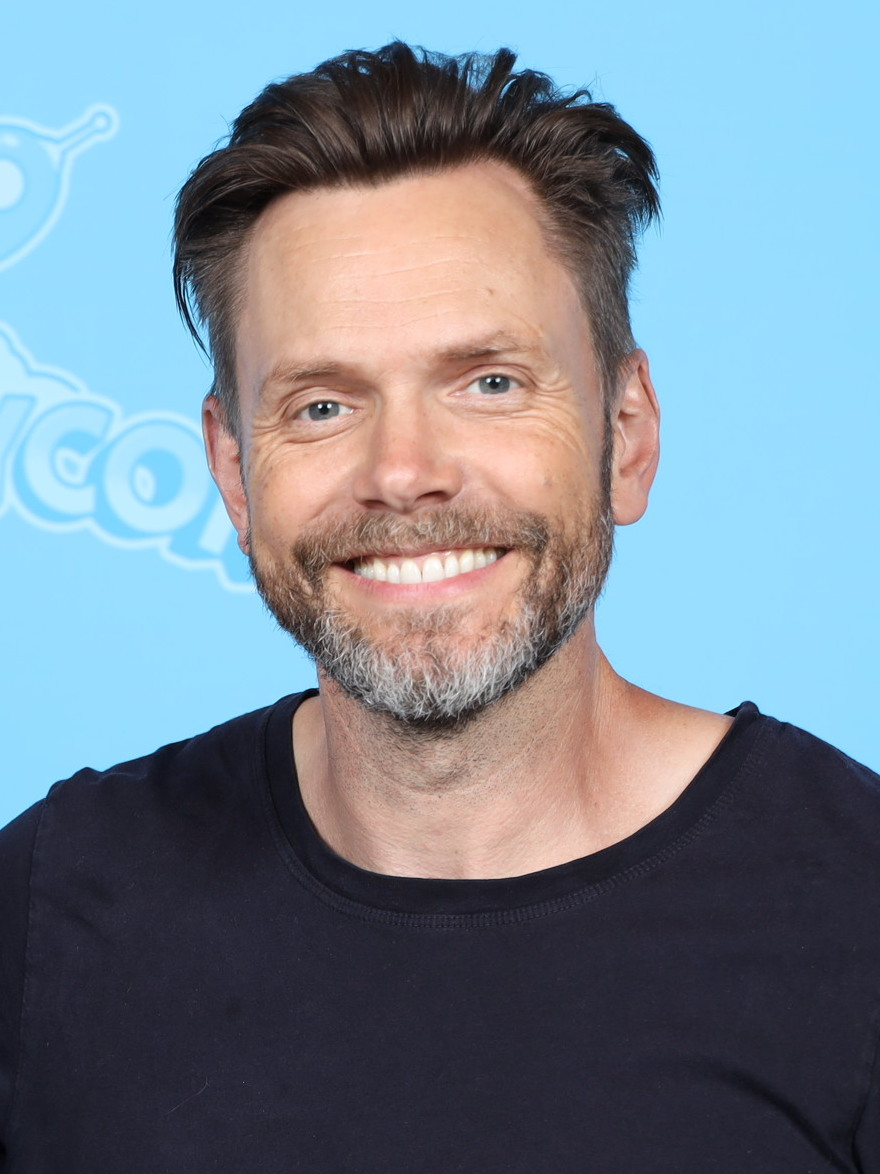
- McHale at GalaxyCon Raleigh in 2023
- Born: Joel Edward McHale; November 20, 1971 (age 54); Rome, Lazio, Italy
- Citizenship: United States
- Education: University of Washington (BA, MFA)
- Occupations: Actor; comedian; television presenter
- Years active: 1996–present
- Spouse: Sarah Williams McHale (m. 1996)
- Children: 2
- Website: joelmchale.com

Joel Edward McHale (/dʒoʊl məxeɪl/; JOHL mək-HAIL; born November 20, 1971) is an American actor, comedian, and television presenter. He is best known for hosting The Soup (2004–2015) and his role as Jeffrey "Jeff" Winger on the NBC sitcom Community (2009–2015). He has performed in the films Spider-Man 2 (2004), Spy Kids: All the Time in the World (2011), Ted (2012), and The Happytime Murders (2018).

McHale also starred in the short-lived CBS sitcom The Great Indoors (2016–2017), hosted a reboot of Card Sharks (2019–2021), and portrayed the superhero Starman on the show Stargirl (2020–2022). In 2020, he hosted a special aftershow interviewing key subjects from the Netflix documentary series Tiger King and voiced Johnny Cage in the direct-to-video martial arts film Mortal Kombat Legends: Scorpion's Revenge, a role he reprised in its sequel, Mortal Kombat Legends: Battle of the Realms (2021). He also voices X-PO in Lego Dimensions (2015–2017) and The Scientist in Fortnite (2021–present). He has a lead role in the Fox comedy series Animal Control (2023–present), and recurred as abusive chef David Fields on the FX on Hulu comedy drama series The Bear (2022–2026).

== Early life ==
McHale was born in Rome, Lazio Region, Italy, on November 20, 1971, the son of Jack McHale, who worked as the dean of students at Loyola University Chicago's Rome Center, and his wife Laurie. His father is American and is from Chicago, while his mother is Canadian and a native of Vancouver. McHale is of Irish and Norwegian descent, and was raised Catholic. He grew up on Mercer Island, Washington, a suburb of Seattle. He also briefly lived in Haddonfield, New Jersey, before returning to Mercer Island. He attended Mercer Island High School. He received a bachelor's degree in history from the University of Washington in 1995, and was briefly in the Theta Chi fraternity but left it because he "couldn't stand it."

McHale was recruited to be on the University of Washington's rowing team but later joined its football team. He was a walk-on as a tight end. He spent two years with the team but did not play in any games. He was on the team that played in the 1993 Rose Bowl. He was part of the Almost Live! cast, a local sketch comedy television show produced by Seattle's KING-TV. From 1993 to 1997, he was a member of the improv comedy group at Unexpected Productions, participating in Theatersports! at the Market Theater located in Pike Place Market in downtown Seattle. He received an MFA from the Professional Actors Training Program at the University of Washington.

== Career ==
=== Hosting ===
In 2004, McHale began hosting The Soup, a satirical weekly television show on the E! television network. Throughout the show, he takes the audience through the oddities and ridiculous happenings of the week in television. He frequently appears as a co-host on Loveline. He has been a judge on Iron Chef America. McHale made a guest appearance on the finale of Last Comic Standing's sixth season, when he recapped the show's events in his typical format of jokes made popular on The Soup. He made an appearance as a guest judge on RuPaul's Drag Race season 11, episode 4, "Trump: The Rusical".

McHale was the host at the 2014 White House Correspondents' Association annual dinner. He hosted the 2011 Independent Spirit Awards and the 2015 ESPY Awards. In 2016, he appeared as an occasional co-host alongside Kelly Ripa in the ABC morning show Live with Kelly. McHale hosted the 43rd People's Choice Awards on January 18, 2017, and the 2017 Webby Awards on May 15, 2017. McHale hosted video game developer and publisher Ubisoft's press conference at E3 2010.

In January 2018, it was announced that he would be receiving his own talk show on Netflix in February. The Joel McHale Show with Joel McHale combined celebrity guests, pre-taped sketches and video clips in a half-hour series that focused on pop culture and news from around the world. On August 17, 2018, it was announced that Netflix had canceled the show after 19 episodes, reportedly due to low viewership.

On April 8, 2019, TVLine reported that McHale would host a revival of the game show Card Sharks for ABC. The revival would premiere on June 12 of that year, running for two seasons and 21 episodes until July 7, 2021. The iteration was canceled in April 2022.

Beginning March 27, 2020, McHale co-hosts The Darkest Timeline podcast with former Community co-star Ken Jeong; the podcast was created in response to the ongoing COVID-19 pandemic. Also in 2020, he hosted an after-show special of the Netflix documentary series Tiger King. With Jeong, they became the new hosts of Fox's New Year's Eve special New Year's Eve Toast & Roast. The second edition was canceled due to the quickly rising cases of Omicron variant in the COVID-19 pandemic.

In 2021, McHale began hosting Crime Scene Kitchen, also on Fox. In 2023, McHale hosted the E! reality competition series House of Villains.

McHale has been the host of the American version of The 1% Club since 2025.

=== Acting ===
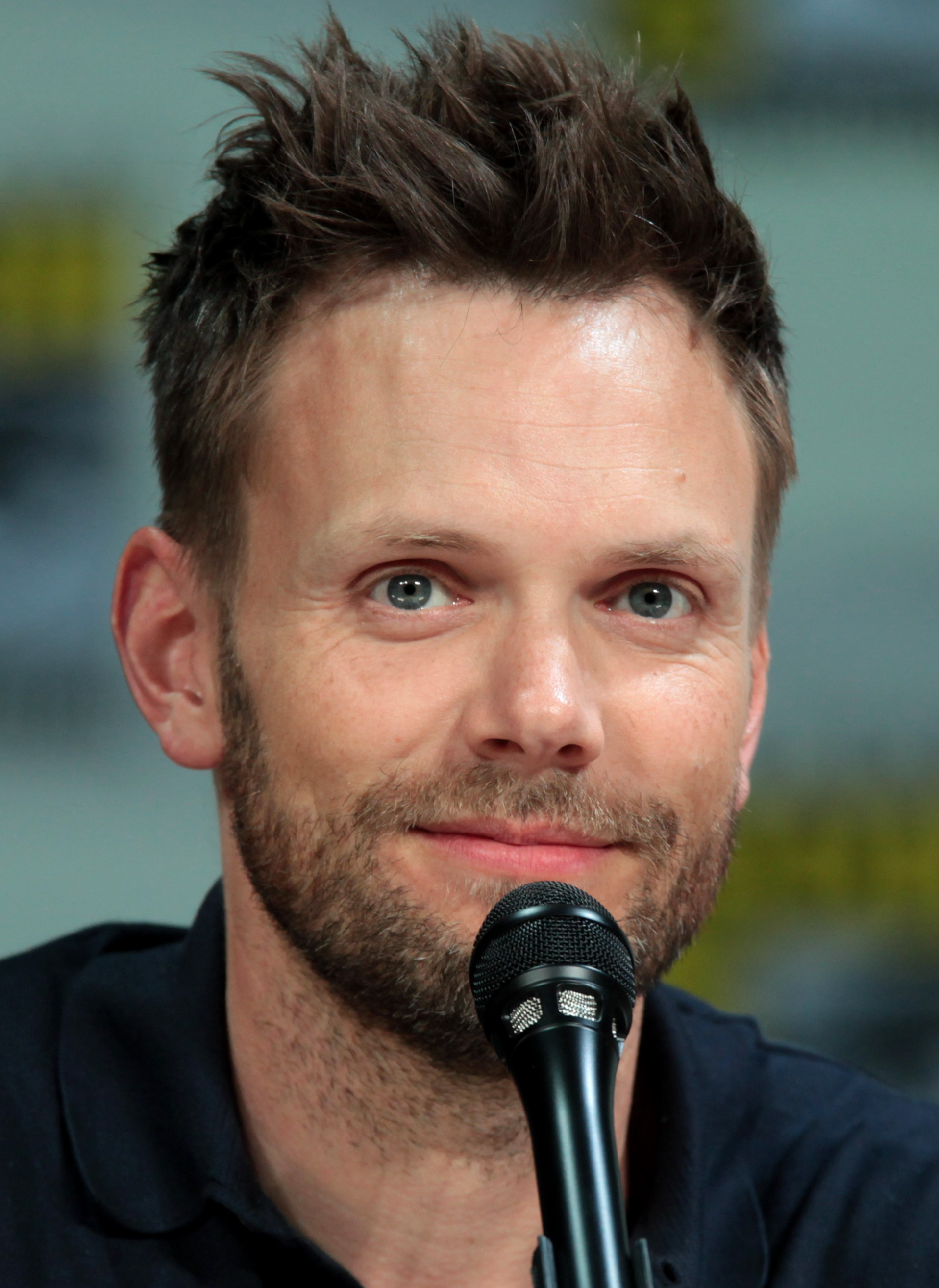
McHale at the 2014 San Diego Comic-Con

After earning his master's degree in acting, McHale moved to Los Angeles and landed small roles in Diagnosis: Murder, CSI: Miami, and Will & Grace. He played a TV reporter in the biopic Lords of Dogtown. He guest-starred as a cast member on the NBC improv comedy show Thank God You're Here during the pilot episode and had a guest role on an episode of Pushing Daisies. McHale appeared in Spider-Man 2 in a small role as Mr. Jacks, a bank manager.

McHale has a long association with Circle X Theatre, where he has done several plays. McHale was a weekly guest on The Adam Carolla Show and Mickey and Amelia, and occasional guest on Opie and Anthony. He occasionally appeared on Countdown with Keith Olbermann in a humor sequence closing the show.

He was involved in the American version of the British TV show The IT Crowd.

McHale starred in the sitcom Community, which premiered in fall 2009, and continued to host The Soup. McHale made an appearance on the first episode of the fifth season of Tosh.0. He played Rex in Ted (2012) and had a short guest stint on the FX show Sons of Anarchy. He played a police officer in the supernatural horror film Deliver Us from Evil. McHale appeared in 3 episodes between the tenth and eleventh seasons of The X-Files in 2016 and 2018, respectively.

McHale played the lead role in the CBS sitcom The Great Indoors, which began airing in the fall of 2016. The series was cancelled on May 13, 2017, due to low ratings.

In 2018, McHale was cast in the recurring role of Chris on the second season of the Netflix horror-comedy series Santa Clarita Diet.

In December 2018, it was announced that McHale was cast as Sylvester Pemberton, the Golden Age Starman in the DC Universe and The CW series Stargirl. After sporadic appearances in its first two seasons, he was upgraded to series regular for the third.

McHale has been a regular guest panelist on The Masked Singer. He first guested in episode four of the first season, then in two episodes of season 2 and episode 8 of season 3. In season 4, he was a guest panelist in episodes 3 and 4, on his first appearance performing Robin Thicke's "Blurred Lines" as the "Robin" (wearing a cut-out face of Robin Thicke). He went on to be a guest panelist in the third episode of season 5 and episode 7 of season 6. He was absent in season 7. He later served as a guest panelist alongside the late Leslie Jordan on episode 7 of season 8.

In April 2025, McHale was announced as starring alongside Paula Patton in the musical indie film Reimagined.

== Personal life ==
McHale married Sarah Williams in July 1996. They have two sons. The family resides in Los Angeles, California, currently in Studio City and previously in Los Feliz.

In a 2018 interview on Dax Shepard's podcast Armchair Expert, McHale revealed he was dyslexic, having discovered this when his two sons were diagnosed.

=== Religious beliefs and political views ===
McHale attends a Presbyterian church and has been supportive of the LGBTQ community. While performing at the Durham Performing Arts Center in North Carolina, he wore a handmade gay-rights shirt, talked about the bathroom law passed weeks prior, and said he was donating all proceeds to the LGBTQ Center of Durham and would not perform in the state again until the law was overturned.

McHale, along with several of his Community castmates, made a campaign video in support of Joe Biden in October 2020 titled "Human Beings for Biden."

== Philanthropy ==
In 2021, McHale has shown his support for the Children's Tumor Foundation, an organization dedicated to raising awareness for and treating neurofibromatosis. Some other charities and foundations that McHale has supported include DoSomething.org, Elton John AIDS Foundation, Friar's Charitable Foundation, Jonsson Cancer Center Foundation, Make-A-Wish Foundation, Motion Picture & Television Fund, Noreen Fraser Foundation, Screen Actors Guild, The FEED Foundation, The Trevor Project, and UNICEF.

== Filmography ==
=== Film ===
Key
†	Denotes films that have not yet been released

Year	Title	Role	Notes	Ref
2004	Spider-Man 2	Mr. Jacks		
2004	Wait	—N/a	Short film	
2005	Lords of Dogtown	Reporter		
2005	Game Time	Johnson	Short film	
2006	Mini's First Time	Host		
2008	The Onion Movie	Office Worker	Uncredited	
2008	Open Season 2	Elliot	Voice	
2009	The Informant!	FBI Agent Robert Herndon		
2011	Spy Kids: All the Time in the World	Wilbur Wilson		
2011	What's Your Number?	Roger		
2011	Comic-Con Episode IV: A Fan's Hope	Himself	Documentary	
2011	The Big Year	Barry Loomis		
2012	Ted	Rex		
2014	Blended	Mark Reynolds		
2014	Deliver Us from Evil	Butler		
2014	Adult Beginners	Hudson		
2014	A Merry Friggin' Christmas	Boyd Mitchler		
2018	Assassination Nation	Nick Mathers		
2018	A Futile and Stupid Gesture	Chevy Chase		
2018	Game Over, Man!	Himself	Cameo	
2018	The Happytime Murders	Agent Campbell		
2019	Trouble	Norbert	Voice	
2020	Mortal Kombat Legends: Scorpion's Revenge	Johnny Cage	Voice, direct-to-video	
2020	Becky	Jeff Hooper		
2021	Happily	Tom		
2021	Mortal Kombat Legends: Battle of the Realms	Johnny Cage	Voice, direct-to-video	
2021	Queenpins	Rick Kaminski		
2022	The Seven Faces of Jane	Michael		
2023	Parachute	Jamie		
2023	Mortal Kombat Legends: Cage Match	Johnny Cage	Voice, direct-to-video	
2023	It's a Wonderful Knife	David Carruthers		
2024	Tim Travers and the Time Traveler's Paradox	James Bunratty		
2025	California King	Zane		
2026	Scream 7	Mark Evans		
2026	Stop! That! Train!	Male passenger 2		

=== Television ===
Year	Title	Role	Notes
1996	Almost Live!	Various	Unknown episodes
1998	Bill Nye the Science Guy	Defendant	Episode: "Fluids"
2000	The Huntress	Quicky the Clown	Episode: "Springing Tiny"
2000	The Fugitive	Curtis	Episode: "Far from Home"
2000	Diagnosis: Murder	Richard	Episode: "By Reason of Insanity"
2001; 2020	Will & Grace	Ian	Episode: "Cheaters"
2001; 2020	Will & Grace	Phil	Episodes: "Filthy Phil, Part I" and "Filthy Phil, Part II"
2004–2015	The Soup	Himself (host)	618 episodes; also writer and executive producer
2005	CSI: Miami	Greg Welch	Episode: "Urban Hellraisers"
2007	The IT Crowd	Roy	US pilot; never aired
2007	Thank God You're Here	Himself	1 episode
2007	Pushing Daisies	Harold Hundin	Episode: "Bitches"
2007; 2009	Robot Chicken	Various Voices	2 episodes
2009–2015	Community	Jeff Winger	Main cast: 110 episodes
2011	26th Independent Spirit Awards	Himself (host)	Television special
2011	Phineas and Ferb	Norm Head Prototype	Voice, episode: "Candace Disconnected"
2012	Sons of Anarchy	Warren	2 episodes
2013	Conan	Conan O'Brien	Episode: "Occupy Conan: When Outsourcing Goes Too Far"
2013–2015	Randy Cunningham: 9th Grade Ninja	First Ninja	Voice, 5 episodes
2013	2013 VGX Awards	Himself (host)	Television special
2014	Video Game High School	The President of the United States	Episode: "OMGWTFPS!?"
2014	White House Correspondents' Dinner	Himself (host)	Television special
2015	Regular Show	DVD	Voice, episode: "Format Wars II"
2015	2015 ESPY Awards	Himself (host)	Television special
2015	Comedy Bang! Bang!	Himself	Episode: "Joel McHale Wears a Navy Zip-up and High Tops"
2015	BoJack Horseman	Alex	Voice, episode: "Yesterdayland"
2016–2018	The X-Files	Tad O'Malley	4 episodes
2016	Dr. Ken	Ross	Episode: "Dave's Valentine"
2016	Difficult People	Felix	Episode: "Hashtag Cats"
2016	Lip Sync Battle	Himself	Episode: "Jim Rash vs. Joel McHale"
2016–2017	The Great Indoors	Jack Gordon	22 episodes
2017	Dimension 404	Dr. Matthew Maker	Episode: "Matchmaker"
2017	Mystery Science Theater 3000	Doug McClure	Episode: "At the Earth's Core"
2017	Rick and Morty	Death Stalker Hemorrhage	Voice, episode: "Rickmancing the Stone"
2017–2018	Milo Murphy's Law	Victor Verliezer	Voice, 2 episodes
2017, 2019	Ryan Hansen Solves Crimes on Television	Himself	2 episodes
2018	The Joel McHale Show with Joel McHale	Himself (host)	19 episodes; also writer and executive producer
2018–2019	Santa Clarita Diet	Chris	4 episodes
2018	Drunk History	George Corwin, Robert Ellis Cahill	Episode: "Halloween"
2019	Joel McHale: Live from Pyongyang	Himself	Comedy special
2019–2022	The Masked Singer	Himself	10 episodes
2019	RuPaul's Drag Race	Himself (guest judge)	Episode: "Trump: The Rusical"
2019	The Rookie	Brad Hayes	Episode: "The Shake Up"
2019–2021	Card Sharks	Himself (host)	21 episodes; also executive producer
2019	Mr. Iglesias	Danny	Episode: "Oh Boy, Danny"
2019	What Just Happened??! with Fred Savage	Himself	Episode: "Preetempted"
2020	Medical Police	Himself	Episode: "Deuce to Nines, Double Draw"
2020	Black-ish	Himself	Episode: "You Don't Know Jack"
2020	Dummy	Jason Levy	Episode: "Ideal Woman"
2020–2022	Stargirl	Sylvester Pemberton / Starman, Ultra-Humanite	Recurring role (Season 1–2); main role (Season 3)
2020	Tiger King	Himself (host)	Episode: "The Tiger King and I"
2020	The Twilight Zone	Orson Rudd	Episode: "8"
2020	Psych 2: Lassie Come Home	Lassiter's Father	Television film
2020	Game On!	Himself (contestant)	Episode: "Celebrity Guests: Becky Lynch and Joel McHale"
2020	Match Game	Himself (contestant)	2 episodes
2020	The Cabin with Bert Kreischer	Himself	Episode: "Fresh Perspectives"
2020	Celebrity Wheel of Fortune	Himself (contestant)	Episode: "Paul Reubens, Nicole Byer and Joel McHale"
2020	New Year's Eve Toast & Roast 2021	Himself (co-host)	Television special; with Ken Jeong
2020	Who Wants to Be a Millionaire?	Himself (contestant)	2 episodes
2021	American Housewife	Doyle Bradford	Episode: "The Election"
2021	Nickelodeon's Unfiltered	Himself	Episode: "Why Did the Bear Cross the Road?"
2021–present	Crime Scene Kitchen	Himself (host)	29 episodes; also executive producer
2022–2024	The Bear	Chef David	7 episodes
2022	Love, Death & Robots	Sergeant Morris	Voice, episode: "Kill Team Kill"
2022	Celebrity Beef	Himself (host)	7 episodes
2023–present	Animal Control	Frank	Main role; also executive producer
2023–present	House of Villains	Himself (host)	
2023	That's My Jam	Himself/Guest	Along with Keke Palmer, Saweetie, will.i.am
2023	Hot Wheels: Ultimate Challenge	Himself / Judge	Episode: "Need for Speed vs. Fight Car"
2023	Is It Cake?	Himself / Judge	Episode: "Body By Cake"
2023	Krapopolis	Sportscaster #1	Voice, episode: "The Stuperbowl"
2023	The Great American Baking Show: Celebrity Holiday	Himself (contestant)	The Roku Channel
2024	We Are Family	Himself (celebrity relative) (Episode 1); Guest host (Episodes 9–10)	3 episodes
2024	Dinner Time Live with David Chang	Himself/Guest	Episode: "Choose Your Own Adventure Menu"
2024	The Simpsons	Himself	Episode: "Bart's Birthday"
2024	American Dad!	Architect	Episode: "Under (and Over, and Beside) the Boardwalk"
2025	Grimsburg	Junior	Voice, episode: “Daddy Daddy Bang Bang”
2025	Yellowjackets	Kodiak	3 episodes
2025–present	The 1% Club	Himself (host)	USA version: season 2–present
2026	Strip Law	Pringus	2 episodes

=== Video games ===
Year	Title	Voice role	Note
2015	Lego Dimensions	X-PO, Himself	
2021–present	Fortnite: Battle Royale	The Scientist	
2022	Area Man Lives	John Kunveni	

== Awards and nominations ==
Year	Award	Category	Work	Result
2010	EWwy Award	Best Actor in a Comedy	Community	Nominated
2011	Critics' Choice Television Award	Best Actor in a Comedy Series	Community	Nominated
2011	EWwy Award	Best Actor in a Comedy	Community	Won
2011	Satellite Award	Best Actor – Television Series Musical or Comedy	Community	Nominated
2012	TV Guide Award	Favorite Ensemble	Community	Won
2012	Critics' Choice Television Award	Best Actor in a Comedy Series	Community	Nominated
2012	PAAFTJ Television Award	Best Lead Actor in a Comedy Series	Community	Nominated
2012	PAAFTJ Television Award	Best Cast in a Comedy Series	Community	Won
2012	EWwy Award	Best Actor, Comedy	Community	Won
2012	Satellite Award	Best Actor – Television Series Musical or Comedy	Community	Nominated
2014	Primetime Emmy Award	Outstanding Short-Format Live-Action Entertainment Program	The Soup	Nominated
2019	Golden Raspberry Award	Worst Supporting Actor	The Happytime Murders	Nominated

== Bibliography ==
- McHale, Joel (2016). Thanks for the Money: How to Use My Life Story to Become the Best Joel McHale You Can Be. Penguin. ISBN 9780399575372.
