= Georgie James =

American indie pop/rock band

- Origin: Washington D.C., United States
- Genres: Indie pop, indie rock
- Years active: 2005–2008
- Labels: Laboratory Records; Saddle Creek Records
- Past members: John Davis; Laura Burhenn; Andrew Black; Michael Cotterman
- Website: Official website (archived)

Georgie James was an American indie pop/rock group from Washington D.C. composed of John Davis (formerly of Q and Not U) and Laura Burhenn.

When Q and Not U disbanded in 2005 after releasing three albums, the band split into three different projects: Ris Paul Ric, a folk/electronic solo effort from Chris Richards; Harris Klahr commenced work on his new project, President; and finally, Georgie James, featuring Q And Not U's drummer Davis.

Having met through the D.C. music scene, vocalist/multi-instrumentalist Davis and vocalist/pianist Burhenn (who had released two solo albums on her own Laboratory Records prior to this project) discovered that they had similar tastes in classic pop music from the 1950s to the 1970s. They decided to start working together as a band, Davis writing the guitars, bass and drums, Burhenn on the Rhodes electric piano. A few hours later they had written a few songs, and decided it was a worthy project to pursue.

Later in 2005, the duo recorded demos at Silver Sonya Studio in Arlington, Virginia with producers Chad Clark and TJ Lipple and also at their practice space in the Brookland neighborhood of Washington, D.C. By November 2005, they produced a 7-song demo, showcasing a mix of cool pop production, dancey riffs reminiscent of Power-era Q and Not U and unexplored territory for the both of them. The resulting demo was entitled Demos at Dance Place (named after the arts center adjacent to their practice space) and was self-released in 2006.

In February 2007, they released their first single, "Need Your Needs," on Burhenn's label, Laboratory Records. That spring, Georgie James signed a record contract with indie label Saddle Creek Records. They toured North America and Europe extensively to promote their debut full length, 'Places,' which was released in September 2007.

The final touring version of the band included Davis on guitar/vocals, Burhenn on keyboard/vocals, Michael Cotterman (formerly of The Loved Ones and Kid Dynamite) on bass and Andrew Black (formerly of The Explosion) on drums. Other musicians that played in the live version of the band included Cale Parks, James Canty, Adam Robinson and Paul Michel.

It was announced on August 4, 2008 that the duo had broken up with hopes of focusing more on respective solo projects. Davis formed a solo project called Title Tracks. The debut Title Tracks album, It Was Easy, was released by The Ernest Jenning Record Co. in February 2010. Burhenn formed a solo project called The Mynabirds. The debut Mynabirds album, What We Lose In The Fire We Gain In The Flood, was released by Saddle Creek in April 2010.

== Discography ==
- Places (2007 · Saddle Creek)
