= Power (Q and Not U album) =

Studio album by Q and Not U
- Released: October 5, 2004
- Recorded: June 2004 at The Love Story
- Genre: Dance-punk, post-punk
- Length: 38:33
- Label: Dischord
- Producer: Pete Cafarella, Rafael Cohen

Q and Not U chronology
Different Damage (2002)	Power (2004)

Singles from Power
- 1. "Book of Flags" Released: September 1, 2003

Professional ratings
Aggregate scores
Source	Rating
Metacritic	72/100
Review scores
Source	Rating
AllMusic	4/5 stars
Pitchfork Media	7.5/10
Tiny Mix Tapes	4.5/5 stars

Power is the third and final studio album by Q and Not U. It was released on October 5, 2004. After touring in support of the album, the group disbanded in September 2005. The album was co-produced by Pete Cafarella and Rafael Cohen (of Supersystem). All tracking was done at The Love Story in Brooklyn, NY. The album was mixed with Don Zientara at Inner Ear Studio and mastered by Chad Clark at Silver Sonya.

Q and Not U have cited Fela Kuti, James Brown, Prince, and Daft Punk as core influences on the album. Frontman Chris Richards has stated that he sought to emulate guitarists Prince and Nile Rodgers with his guitarwork.

== Track listing ==
All tracks are written by Q and Not U.

No.	Title	Length
1.	"Wonderful People"	3:07
2.	"7 Daughters"	2:21
3.	"L.A.X."	2:29
4.	"Throw Back Your Head"	2:56
5.	"Wet Work"	3:18
6.	"District Night Prayer"	1:16
7.	"Collect the Diamonds"	3:43
8.	"Beautiful Beats"	3:05
9.	"Dine"	3:11
10.	"X-Polynation"	2:47
11.	"Passwords"	2:56
12.	"Book of Flags"	2:44
13.	"Tag-Tag"	4:40
