= On Play Patterns =

EP by Q and Not U
- Released: 2002
- Recorded: Inner Ear Studios in January 2002
- Label: Dischord

On Play Patterns is a Q and Not U EP that was recorded at Inner Ear Studios in January 2002 and released on Dischord Records in April 2002 on both CD and 7" formats. It was produced and engineered by Ian MacKaye and Don Zientara. Cover art photography was taken by Shawn Brackbill at the National Gallery of Art in Washington, D.C. "Soft Pyramids" was re-recorded for Different Damage, the full-length album that followed in the fall of 2002. It is often mistakenly thought that "Ten Thousand Animal Calls" was re-recorded for Different Damage as well, under the title "So Many Animal Calls." However, "So Many Animal Calls" is merely a "lyrical sequel" and the music is wholly different from "Ten Thousand Animal Calls." On Play Patterns was the first release for Q And Not U in its trio formation, following the dismissal of bassist Matt Borlik. As a result, there is no bass guitar on this recording, although the band did use bass guitar on future recordings.

It was rated four stars by Punknews.org.

== Track listing ==
1. "Ten Thousand Animal Calls"
2. "Soft Pyramids"
