= Title Tracks =

- Origin: Washington, D.C., United States
- Genres: Power pop
- Years active: 2008-2017
- Labels: Ernest Jenning; Dischord Records
- Formerly of: Q and Not U Georgie James; Corm
- Past members: John Davis; Andrew Black; Michael Cotterman; Elmer Sharp; Nick Anderson; Meredith Munoz; Eamon Aiken; Mike Sneeringer

Title Tracks was an American power pop/indie rock solo project from Washington, D.C.–based musician John Davis, formerly of Q and Not U and Georgie James.

== History ==
In early 2008, although still a member of the band Georgie James, Davis began writing the songs that formed the basis for his first solo record. By the time Georgie James announced its dissolution in the summer of 2008, Davis had already written an album's worth of songs and called his new solo project Title Tracks. He put together a live version of the band that included Michael Cotterman on bass, Andrew Black on drums (both of whom played in the primary live version of Georgie James) and Merideth Munoz on guitar, keyboards and vocals.

In fall 2008, that version of the band recorded two songs, "Every Little Bit Hurts" and "Found Out," with producer Chad Clark at Silver Sonya Studios in Washington, D.C. The single was released in April 2009 by Dischord Records.

In January 2009, Davis commenced recording the debut Title Tracks full-length, It Was Easy. Basic tracks were recorded at his practice space in NE Washington, D.C. Nick Anderson engineered and co-produced, along with Davis and Clark. Additional tracking was done at Silver Sonya and The National Crayon Museum. Davis played all of the instruments on the record, with the exception of the saxophonist Kriston Capps, who contributed to "No, Girl." Tracyanne Campbell, of the band Camera Obscura, also sang on "No, Girl" and "Tougher Than The Rest" (a cover of a Bruce Springsteen song). It Was Easy was released in February 2010 by Ernest Jenning.

By the time of the album's release, Munoz had left the group and Anderson replaced her in the live version of the group. North American touring commenced in February 2010 and ran through May 2010. Title Tracks toured with Pretty & Nice and Ted Leo and the Pharmacists. In August 2010, Title Tracks pared its live band down to a trio of Davis, Cotterman and Black. This lineup recorded an album in the fall of 2010, In Blank, which was released by Ernest Jenning in April 2011. While touring for In Blank, drummers Mike Sneeringer and Elmer Sharp were brought in for different legs of the tour. Sharp remained with the band for subsequent shows and recordings.

After more than five years without a new release, Title Tracks issued its third full-length album, Long Dream, in November 2016. The band has been inactive since 2017.

== Releases ==
=== Albums ===
- It Was Easy (Ernest Jenning/Safety Meeting Records, February 2010)
- In Blank (Ernest Jenning/Windian Records, April 2011)
- Long Dream (Ernest Jenning, November 2016)

=== Singles ===
- Every Little Bit Hurts/Found Out (Dischord Records, 2009)
