= Places (Georgie James album) =

Studio album by Georgie James
- Released: September 25, 2007
- Genre: Indie rock
- Length: 39:40
- Label: Saddle Creek
- Producer: Chad Clark and TJ Lipple with Georgie James

Professional ratings
Review scores
Source	Rating
Allmusic	link
Pitchfork Media	7.4/10 link
Obscure Sound	favorable link
Treble	favorable link

Places is the lone album by the Washington, D.C. indie rock band Georgie James, released on September 25, 2007. It includes the singles "Need Your Needs" and "Cake Parade." Guest musicians include Andrew Black (The Explosion), T.J. Lipple (Aloha), Tony Cavallario (Aloha) and Matthew Gengler (Aloha). The artwork for the album was designed by the band and Zack Nipper.

== Track listing ==
1. "Look Me Up" – 3:11
2. "Cake Parade" – 3:24
3. "Need Your Needs" – 3:34
4. "Long Week" – 3:22
5. "More Lights" – 3:23
6. "Henry and Hanzy" – 3:16
7. "Comfortable Headphones" – 3:55
8. "Hard Feelings" – 2:11
9. "Places" – 3:08
10. "Cheap Champagne" – 3:57
11. "You Can Have It" – 3:13
12. "Only 'Cause You're Young" – 3:23
