= Wet Confetti =

American art rock band

Background information
- Origin: Portland, Oregon, US
- Genres: Indie rock, post-punk, classic rock
- Years active: 2000–2007
- Labels: Pampelmoose
- Members: Alberta Poon; Daniel Grazzini; Michael McKinnon

Wet Confetti is an American art rock band that formed in Portland, Oregon, United States, during November 2000. They are a three piece that consist of Alberta Poon on vocals, Bass VI and keytar; Daniel Grazzini on guitar and keyboards; and Michael McKinnon on drums. The band's name is taken from the French novel To the End of the World by Blaise Cendrars. The band blends rock, punk, pop, noise, rhythmic drumming and melodic breathless vocals together to make their own very distinctive sound. In January 2007 they introduced Richel Martinez as a live touring member. The band recently appeared in the third installment of the Burn to Shine series produced by Fugazi's Brendan Canty and directed by filmmaker Christoph Green. Their most recent album, "Laughing Gasping", was published by Pampelmoose, a label started by Gang of Four bass player Dave Allen.

Wet Confetti broke up in 2007, and the band members formed Reporter.

== Discography ==
- Another Fair, Another Show (2000)
- Policia de la Educacion (2002)
- This is so Illegal (Do It Fast) (2004)
- Laughing Gasping (2007)

Wet Confetti has also had songs included on numerous compilations and two Consolidated Skateboard videos.
