= No Kill No Beep Beep =

Studio album by Q and Not U
- Released: October 24, 2000
- Recorded: June 2000 at Inner Ear Studios
- Genres: Post-hardcore, post-punk, dance-punk
- Length: 38:16
- Label: Dischord
- Producers: Ian MacKaye, Don Zientara

Q and Not U chronology
No Kill No Beep Beep (2000)	Different Damage (2002)

Professional ratings
Review scores
Source	Rating
AllMusic	4/5 stars
Pitchfork Media	7.1/10

No Kill No Beep Beep is the debut album by Q and Not U. It was released on October 24, 2000. The album brought a slightly groovier, more dance-oriented sound to the Dischord label.

== Production ==
It was produced and engineered by Ian MacKaye and Don Zientara. The photography is by Shawn Brackbill.

== Cover art ==
The photograph used as the album's cover was taken at George Washington University's Smith Hall and featured many of the band's fellow scenesters. According to drummer John Davis, the band sought to prove that the Washington, D.C. scene was not made up entirely of older people: "The point of the cover is that, with only a few exceptions, everyone was 25 and under. It was like the new D.C. 'These are people here now, these are people in bands now, these are our roommates, our friends, our coworkers.'"

== Critical reception ==
The Washington Post wrote that "for all of Q and Not U's competence and energy, No Kill No Beep Beep is so coy and tangential that it ends up in the same place it began."

== Track listing ==
1. "A Line in the Sand" – 3:05
2. "End the Washington Monument (Blinks) Goodnight" – 2:21
3. "Fever Sleeves" – 2:44
4. "Hooray for Humans" – 3:12
5. "Kiss Distinctly American" – 5:05
6. "We Heart Our Hive" – 4:36
7. "Little Sparkee" – 2:06
8. "The More I Get the More I Want" – 4:07
9. "Y Plus White Girl" – 2:39
10. "Nine Things Everybody Knows" – 4:22
11. "Sleeping the Terror Code" – 5:19
