= Kool-Aid Man Challenge =

Internet trend and viral prank

Fence plowing, also known as fence popping, is an internet trend and viral prank whereby people, typically teenagers, will run full-speed into a wood or vinyl fence with the goal of busting through the slats. It was later rebranded as the Kool-Aid Man Challenge following a resurgence on TikTok.

== Background and original trend ==
External videos
- Fence Plowing (Original upload dated June 9, 2006)

The internet trend first began in 2006 when Adam Schleichkorn posted a video to YouTube of his friend and his cousin running through intact wooden fence panels. Schleichkorn explained that the fence featured in the video was damaged after a hurricane, and was slated to be torn down anyway. He did not intend to endorse vandalism. Originally titled "Guy Runs Through a Fence", it was changed to simply "Fence Plowing".

By January 2007, people had begun copying the video, which eventually led to the arrest of five children in Deer Park, New York for vandalism. Ten additional instances were investigated by Deer Park police around the same time, and it became a growing concern for home-owners on Long Island.

The video had garnered over 70,000 views by February, and Schleichkorn was invited to talk about the fad on Fox News and with Maury Povich. The video sparked a larger conversation on teen debauchery, especially in the context of posting videos of otherwise extreme acts to gain popularity and attention. Schleichkorn himself was a critic of the vandalism, and was outspoken on several more news outlets and talk shows. He later wrote about his experiences for a term paper in graduate school.

Fence plowing continued in New City, New York as late as 2009. The trend saw middling usage into the mid-2010s, as reported in areas such as Salt Lake City.

== Resurgence ==
Fence plowing was repopularized on TikTok in 2021, where it became known as the Kool-Aid Man Challenge. It was so named after the modus operandi of the Kool-Aid Man, a mascot known for smashing through walls and fences to deliver beverages to children.

The trend saw a resurgence nationwide in the United States, and cities such as Caldwell, Idaho and Omaha, Nebraska reported up to 15 instances each by November. Each case cost homeowners up to a couple thousand dollars in repairs. In 2023, further damages and arrests were made in Long Island, St. John, Indiana, and Raynham, Massachusetts.

In 2025, fences were damaged in Twin Falls, Idaho and several more incidents were reported in Calera, Alabama and New York City.
