= R. Edward Lopez =

Radio personality

R. Edward "Bob" Lopez
- Born: 1953
- Died: May 22, 2005 (aged 51–52)
- Education: University of Maryland
- Occupations: Broadcaster, radio personality
- Years active: 1978–2005
- Employer: 98Rock
- Known for: Kirk, Mark & Lopez morning show

R. Edward "Bob" Lopez (1953 – May 22, 2005) was a newsman and morning radio personality on Baltimore's 98Rock. Joining the station in 1978, Lopez participated in 13 morning radio shows during his 27 years at the station. He was known for his sense of humor and liberal political views.

In the late 1980s, he co-hosted with Bob Rivers. For the last part of his career, he was part of the "Kirk, Mark & Lopez" or "KML" morning show, along with Kirk McEwen and Mark Ondayko, with whom he worked for seven years. He also hosted the Sunday Lopez, a Sunday morning talk show where he discussed politics and listeners called in to express their views. The Sunday Lopez was preceded by the longer-running The Spanish Inquisition, in the same time slot with the same format. Lopez held the national record for longest tenure for a news man at a rock station.

Lopez grew up in Prince George's County, Maryland, and attended the University of Maryland, College Park, getting his first on-air experience at the campus radio station, WMUC-FM. He later worked at WLMD, a small AM station in Laurel, Maryland, earning $2.25 an hour, before moving to Baltimore in 1977 and joining 98Rock in 1978.

Lopez was diagnosed with lung cancer in February 2004, having been a smoker for several decades, starting at age 12. He continued to participate in the Kirk, Mark & Lopez radio show while undergoing chemotherapy and radiation therapy. During his treatment, Lopez and his co-hosts made his cancer a frequent source of humor on air, remarking that his hair loss made him look like Uncle Fester. After a long and public battle with the disease, Lopez died at the age of 52. He was survived by his wife of 21 years (Jean, referred to on air as "Trixie"), and his 13-year-old daughter, Leandra.

== Sources ==
- Rodricks, Dan (May 26, 2005). "Gifted Lopez a strong voice for Baltimore". The Baltimore Sun. Archived from the original on October 1, 2007.
