= Eisen Bernardo =

Filipino graphic designer

Eisen Bernardo is a Filipino graphic designer and children's book illustrator. He is known for his digital collages of magazines, album covers, and classical paintings.

== Biography ==
Bernardo was born and raised in Abra de Ilog, Occidental Mindoro. He finished a Bachelor of Science in Development Communication (cum laude) from the University of the Philippines Los Banos.

== Works ==
=== Mag+Art ===
His Mag+Art project, which is a collection of digital collages featuring magazine covers and classical paintings, is featured in more than 1,000 online articles in more than 30 countries.

Tribu Magazine wrote about his Mag+Art collages: "With the collage precision of John Stezaker, and the tongue-in-cheek social commentary of Andy Warhol, Eisen Bernardo may not be regarded as one of the greats, but certainly has a sharp eye for satire. With his collection 'Mag + Art' he layers the covers of magazines – anything from Vogue, to Wired, to Time, provided it has a full-cover portrait of a public figure on it – over classical paintings, some better known than others, to create a strange dichotomy of the present as the past, and the past as the future."

Lomography.com expounded on this work: "Pop culture is an ever growing organism. Artwork after artwork and mash up after mash up, it is being transformed from one medium to another. Bernardo's work proves that pop culture can be placed alongside classical art without incident. The artist's attention to detail is also one of the factors that make his 'Mag + Art' series a big hit. The palette and brush strokes make the magazine covers feel at home in the canvas and paint-ridden classical art world."

=== Album+Art ===
After Mag+Art, an offshoot project titled Album+Art (@albumplusart in Instagram) made waves online. Album+Art was featured in various music, arts and graphic design, and entertainment and general interest sites such as Yahoo France and Spain, Rolling Stone Brasil, Buzzfeed, NME Magazine, Spin, Vice, Grazia, GQ Australia, Marie Claire Ukraine, Harper's Bazaar Serbia, International Business Times UK, ArtNet, Status Magazine, DesignBoom, Fast Company, DesignTaxi, Mashable, El Pais, The Culture Trip, ShortList Magazine, Art Magazin Germany, and Telemundo. In a series of digital collages that are gaining traction on Instagram, the Philippines-based graphic artist placed various album covers by performers such as David Bowie, Whitney Houston, and Lana Del Rey atop paintings by Pablo Picasso, John Singer Sargent, and others.

Artnet compared his work to Christian Marclay (known for producing human figures assembled from various record covers). But Bernardo's works comprise a universe of their own, where recognizable musicians find themselves placed into the art historical canon in curious ways.

Crave online praised Album+Art: "Bernardo's works transform the staid styles of the past into something more relevant to modern day. As with most advancements in style that become repeated to the point of cliché, they once were groundbreaking ways of changing the way we see ourselves and the world. He restores this crisp sense of freshness to the work, bringing them alive once more by showing how much their iconography speaks to our current world—and in doing so he gives pop culture a crash course in the history of Western art."

Album+Art won the People's Voice Award in the 21st Webby Awards (Social -Music Category).

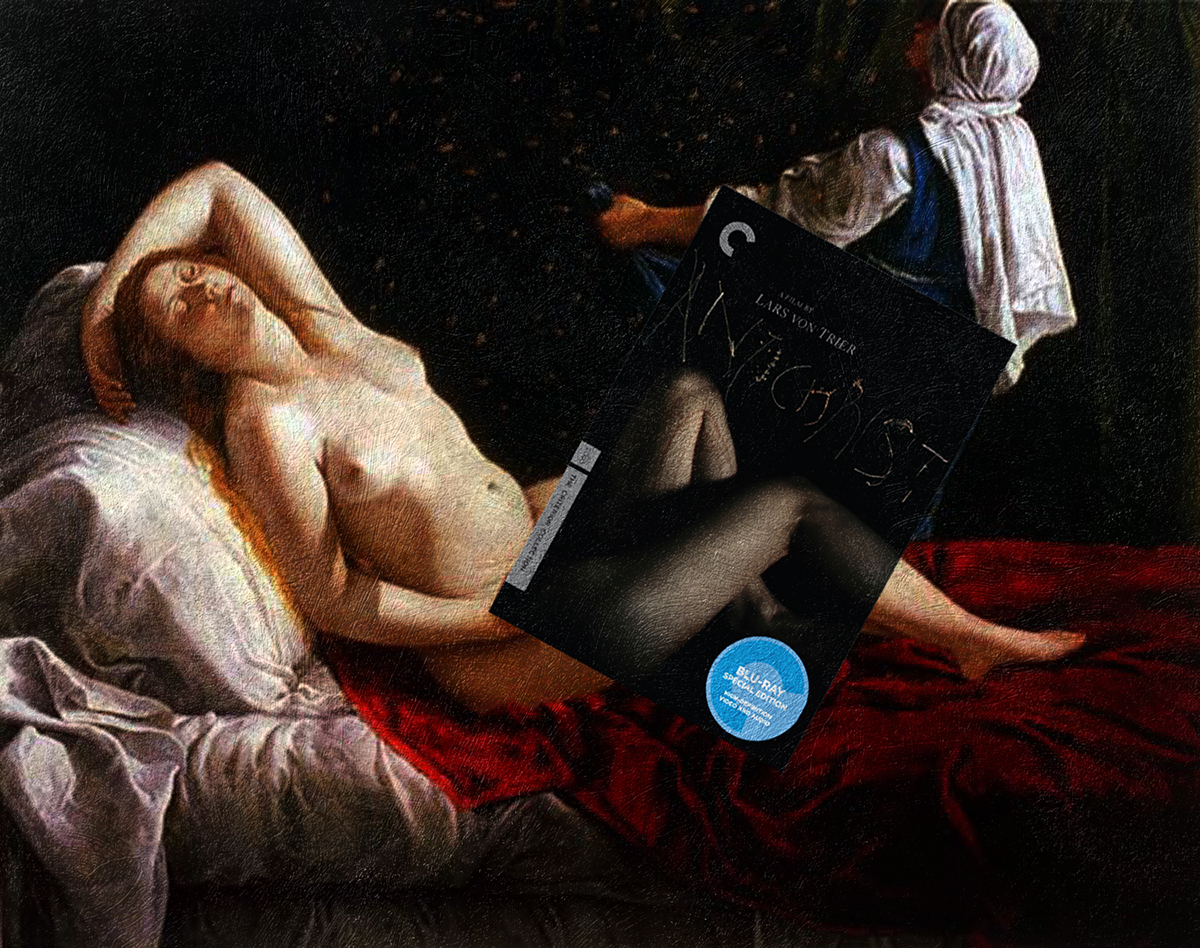
AntiChrist by Lars Von Trier + Danae by Artemisia Gentileschi

=== Criterion+Art ===
This series speaks directly to movie fans as it substitutes albums for Criterion Collection film covers. Titled Criterion+Art, the combination of DVD covers and classical paintings adds new meanings to the historic images.

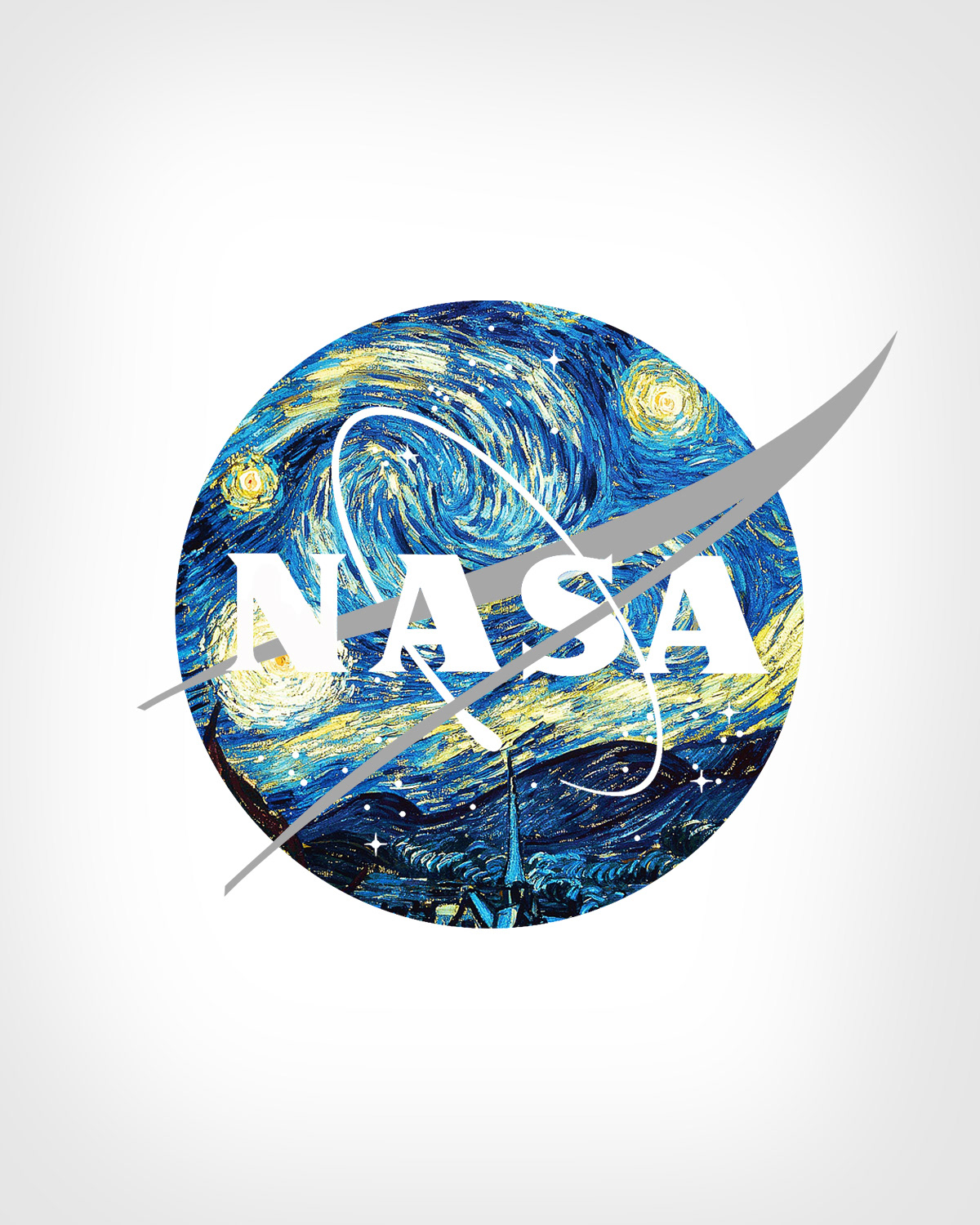
National Aeronautics and Space Administration + The Starry Night by Vincent van Gogh

=== Logo+Art ===
Bernardo overlays popular logos from the likes of Puma, Shell, and Apple with works of art that cleverly correspond with the brand–NASA, say, and Vincent van Gogh's The Starry Night. According to the artist, Logo+Art is an examination of art and consumerism, expression and function, and personal and industrial. Saatchi Art called this work as brilliantly cheeky that shocks the viewer by re-creating popular logos with paintings that emulate a parallel visual component.

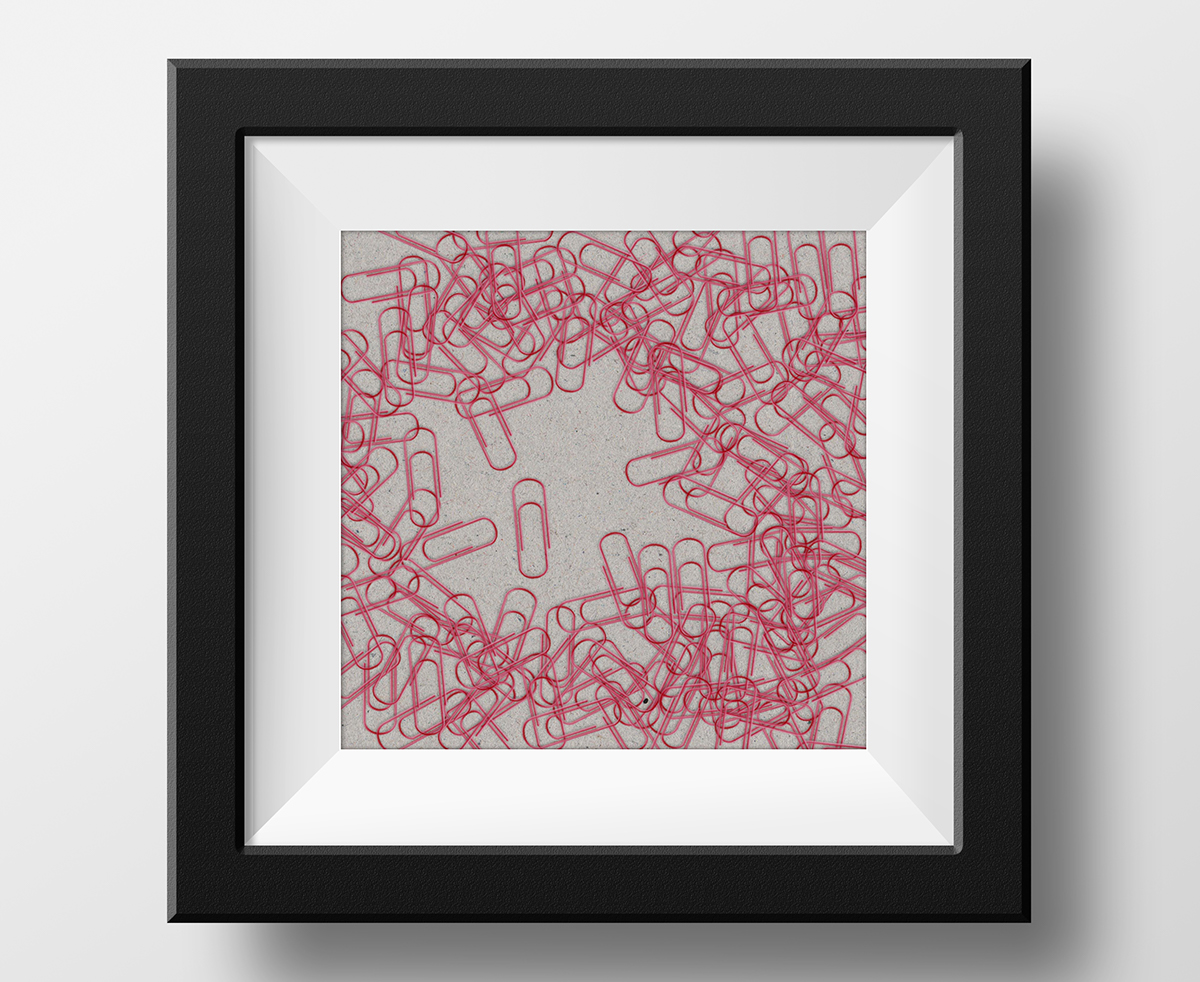
Anxiety depicted using paper clips

=== #keepittogether ===
His #keepittogether artworks – a series of digital artwork using paper clips as a symbol in depicting mental illness became popular online and featured in the Huffington Post, My Moden Met, Bored Panda, The Mighty, National Geographic Serbia, India Times, 9Gag, ScoopWhoop, Ranker, and others websites in more than 20 countries. Inspired by the Project Semicolon popularized by the late Amy Bleuel, Eisen Bernardo used the paperclip as a reminder to keep things together. The artwork is described as brilliant, precise and too familiar.
