= It Was Easy =

Studio album by Title Tracks
- Released: February 23, 2010
- Genre: Indie rock, power pop
- Length: 32:20
- Label: The Ernest Jenning Record Co.
- Producer: Chad Clark, Nick Anderson and John Davis

Professional ratings
Review scores
Source	Rating
AllMusic	4/5 stars
Pitchfork Media	(6.8/10)
Washington City Paper	(favorable)
PopMatters	(7/10)

It Was Easy is the debut album by Title Tracks, the solo project from the Washington, D.C.-based musician, John Davis. It was released on February 23, 2010, in digital formats by The Ernest Jenning Record Co. and as an LP by Safety Meeting Records. It was recorded in January 2009 at Brookland Studios, Silver Sonya Studios, and The National Crayon Museum. Davis performed all of the vocals and instruments on the record except for Kriston Capps (saxophone on "No, Girl") and Tracyanne Campbell (vocals on "No, Girl" and "Tougher Than The Rest"). The album contains nine songs by Davis and two covers (Bruce Springsteen's "Tougher Than the Rest" and The Byrds' "She Don't Care About Time.")

== Track listing ==
All songs written by John Davis unless otherwise noted.

1. "Every Little Bit Hurts" – 3:18
2. "No, Girl" – 3:31
3. "Black Bubblegum" – 3:06
4. "Piles of Paper" – 3:01
5. "Hello There" – 3:43
6. "Tougher Than the Rest" (Bruce Springsteen) – 2:36
7. "Steady Love" – 2:50
8. "It Was Easy" – 2:18
9. "At Fifteen" – 2:34
10. "Found Out" – 2:35
11. "She Don't Care About Time" (Gene Clark) – 2:48
