= Josh Spiegel =

American radio journalist (born 1975)

Josh Spiegel (born July 25, 1975) is an American radio personality based in Baltimore, Maryland.

He lives in Owings Mills, Maryland.

== Career ==
Spiegel began his career in radio at age 12. He served as a radio intern at WPGC-FM and has worked on morning shows in Dallas, Denver, New York and Washington, D.C. Spiegel was also a news writer for the television stations WJZ in Baltimore and WJLA in D.C.

On August 22, 2005, Spiegel joined the WIYY 98 Rock Morning Show as a news man.

He formerly broadcast on the show Out to Lunch with Big O and Dukes on the then WHFS 99.1. The “Kirk, Mark and Spiegel” morning show was nominated as "Best Personality/Show Of The Year" by Radio & Records magazine in 2006.

In 2007, Baltimore City Paper named Spiegel the "Best Radio Personality"; for the rest of that day, the Mickey, Amelia & Spiegel Show was renamed to Spiegel, Spiegel & Spiegel in honor of the award.

In 2007 and 2008, the “Mickey, Amelia and Spiegel” show was nominated as "Best Personality/Show Of The Year" by Radio & Records magazine at its industry achievement awards.

Spiegel has won 8 Edward R. Murrow Awards in the writing category for his commentary segments on WBAL (AM). His wins occurred in 2013, 2014, 2017, 2020, 2021, 2022, 2023 and 2026.
