= Justin Moyer =

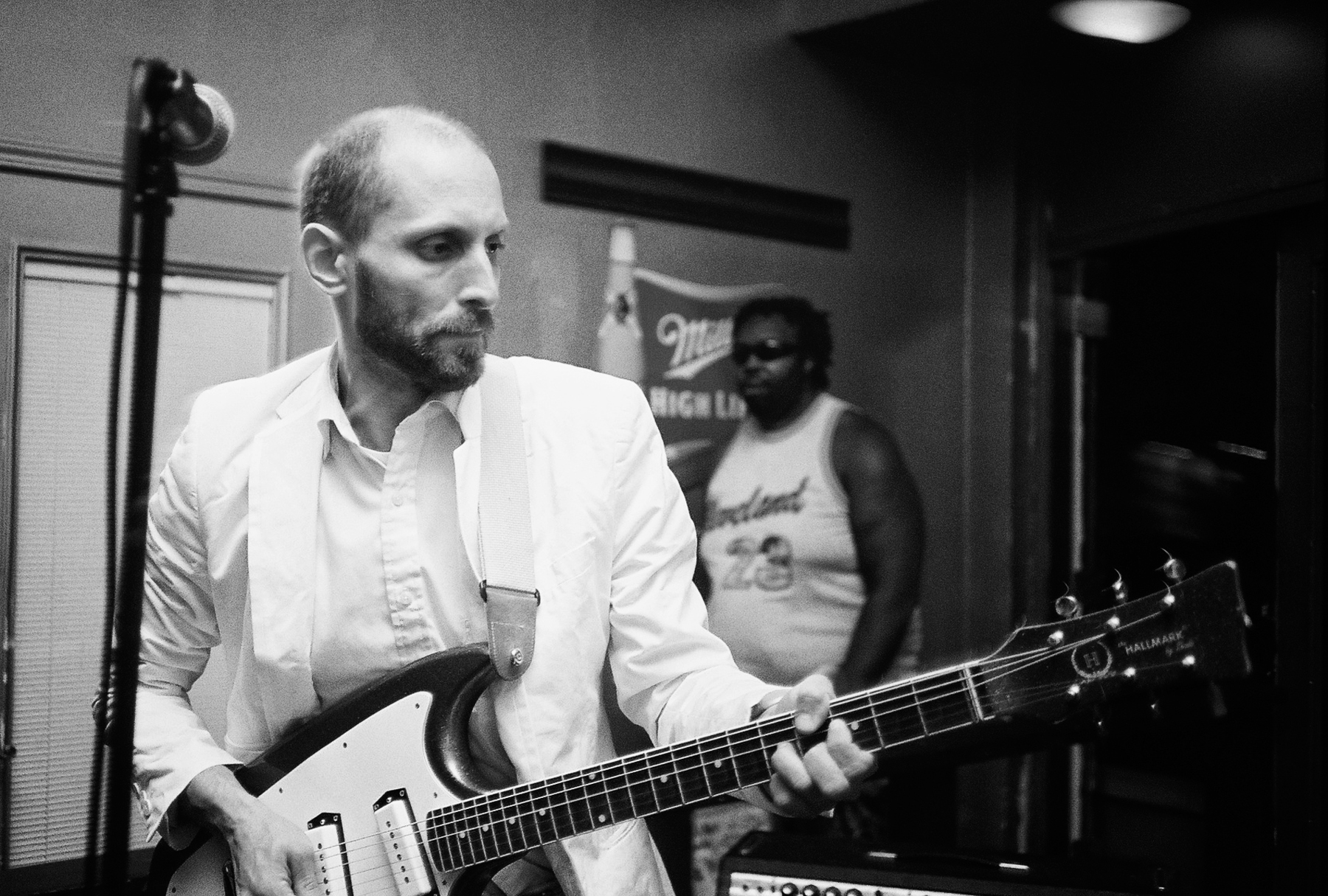
- Moyer performing in 2012

Background information
- Born: 1977 (age 48–49)
- Origin: Philadelphia, Pennsylvania, U.S.
- Genres: Post-punk, indie rock, funk rock, soul rock, post-hardcore
- Occupations: Musician, writer, attorney
- Instruments: Vocals, bass, guitar, drums
- Years active: 1996–present
- Labels: Dischord, DeSoto, Mud Memory, Touch and Go, Resin, Lovitt Records, Sockets Records, Don Giovanni Records
- Website: www.mudmemory.com

Justin Moyer (born 1977) is an American musician, journalist, and attorney. He has been a member of many Washington, D.C.–based bands on Dischord Records, including El Guapo, Supersystem, Antelope, Edie Sedgwick, and Light Beams. He was part of a Pulitzer Prize-winning team at The Washington Post that covered the Capitol insurrection.

== Bands ==
=== El Guapo/Supersystem ===
Moyer formed El Guapo with Rafael Cohen, now a member of !!!, at Wesleyan University in 1996, when Moyer and Cohen were juniors. After recording for Resin, Mud Memory, Dischord, and Touch and Go Records, the band broke up in 2006.

=== Antelope ===
Moyer formed Antelope with Bee Elvy and Mike Andre in 2001. After releasing an eponymous EP produced by Trans Am's Phil Manley as well as a single and full-length produced by Ian MacKaye, the band broke up in 2008.

=== SPRCSS ===
In 2006, Moyer declared the defunct New Jersey group S-Process, also known as SPRCSS, his favorite band in a blog post and called for the band to reform. Partially in response to this plea, SPRCSS, which had recorded for French Kiss Records, reformed in 2007 with Moyer playing guitar. After founding drummer Daneil Mazone quit the band in 2011, the band, fronted by founding guitarist Bob Doto, played additional shows with TJ Lipple on drums, and a final show at Fort Reno Park with Moyer on drums. Later that year, the band digitally self-released two EPs produced by Moyer and Ian MacKaye.

=== E.D. Sedgwick ===
Moyer formed Edie Sedgwick with Ryan Hicks (formerly of Bloomington, Ind.'s Panoply Academy Glee Club) in 1999. The duo, who wrote songs about celebrities, took its name from Andy Warhol superstar Edie Sedgwick. Moyer played bass; Hicks played drums. After releasing "First Reflections," an LP, on Moyer's Mud Memory Records and recording another, the band went on hiatus in 2001 when Moyer was diagnosed with epilepsy.

In 2004, Moyer relaunched Edie Sedgwick as a solo act, performing in drag accompanied only by an iPod. He released the LP "Her Love is Real But She Is Not," a well-reviewed electroclash effort recorded primarily in his bedroom, on Desoto Records in 2005. "I always found it strange that every musician I met would spend so much time engrossed by visual media and then write a song about class struggle or Rwandan genocide," Moyer said in 2008. "I'm more interested in making my art about Molly Ringwald or Martin Sheen than exploring these so-called weighty topics which, for better and worse, are alien to me."

After releasing "Things Are Getting Sinister and Sinisterer," an LP, on Dischord in 2008, Moyer again reformatted the band—he no longer performs in drag, and performs exclusively with women. Subsequent tours and videos to support 2011's LP "Love Gets Lovelier Every Day" have showcased this version of the band, now called "E.D. Sedgwick" instead of "Edie Sedgwick." "We Wear White," Sedgwick's most recent LP, was released in November 2012.

=== Puff Pieces ===
Moyer plays guitar in Puff Pieces, a trio featuring Mike Andre of Antelope and Amanda Huron of Vertebrates. The band released a single on Lovitt Records in 2014, and a full-length in 2016.

=== Light Beams ===
Light Beams, a trio featuring Moyer, bassist Arthur Noll and drummer Sam Lavine, released a cassette and a split seven-inch with Ian Svenonius's solo project Escapism in 2017. The trio's first full-length, "Self Help" (2020), won a Washington Area Music Association award in 2021.

After adding percussionists Leah Gage and Erin McCarley, the quintet released another full-length, "Wild Life," in 2023.

== Discography ==
Release date	Album name	Group name	Record label
1997	Untitled 7"	El Guapo	Red Skies at Night Records
1998	The Burden of History	El Guapo	Resin Records
1999	The Phenomenon of Renewal	El Guapo	Resin Records
2000	The Geography of Dissolution	El Guapo	Mud Memory Records
2001	super/system	El Guapo	Dischord Records
2001	First Reflections	Edie Sedgwick	Dischord Records/Mud Memory Records
2002	Fake French	El Guapo	Dischord Records
2003	Begin Live Transmission	El Guapo	Dischord Records
2003	s/t	Antelope	Dischord Records/Bug Records
2004	Crowns/The Flock	Antelope	Dischord Records
2005	Always Never Again	Supersystem	Touch and Go Records
2005	Her Love is Real But She is Not	Edie Sedgwick	Desoto Records
2005	Born into the World/Defcon	Supersystem	Touch and Go Records
2005	Miracle	Supersystem	Touch and Go Records
2006	A Million Microphones	Supersystem	Touch and Go Records
2007	Reflector	Antelope	Dischord Records
2008	Things are Getting Sinister and Sinisterer	Edie Sedgwick	Dischord Records
2011	Love Gets Lovelier Every Day	Edie Sedgwick	Dischord Records
2011	Songs for Isadora	Edie Sedgwick and A.K.	Sockets Records
2012	We Wear White	E.D. Sedgwick	Dischord Records
2012	Heat Wave 12"	E.D. Sedgwick	Dischord Records/Mud Memory Records
2014	s/t 7"	Puff Pieces	Lovitt Records
2016	Bland in D.C.	Puff Pieces	Lovitt Records
2017	Born 2 Die 7"	Puff Pieces	Lovitt Records
2017	Light Beams Cassette	Light Beams	Don Giovanni Records
2017	Escapism/Light Beams Split 7"	Light Beams	Lovitt Records
2020	Self Help	Light Beams	Don Giovanni Records
2023	Wild Life	Light Beams	Dischord Records/Mud Memory Records
2025	Emulate 7"	Light Beams	Dischord Records/Mud Memory Records
2025	Step Back 7"	Light Beams	Peterwalkee Records

== Writing ==
Moyer, a former private investigator, is a long-time freelancer for The Washington City Paper, where he covered the 2008 election, and blogs about books and life as a touring musician. Since 2008, he has written for The Washington Post, where he reviews books and writes about poker and city politics.

In 2009, Moyer was criticized by conservative websites for a piece on Jenna Bush. His pieces about the Beatles, the Google Doodle and jazz have also generated controversy.
