= X-Polynation/Book of Flags =

EP by Q and Not U
- Released: September 2003
- Recorded: June 2003; Inner Ear Studios
- Label: Dischord Records

X-Polynation/Book of Flags is a two-song EP by Q and Not U, recorded at Inner Ear Studios in June 2003 and released in September 2003 by Dischord Records. It can be found on both CD and 7" formats. Photography by Shawn Brackbill.

== Track listing ==
1. "X-Polynation"
2. "Book of Flags"
