= How to Be a Girl (podcast) =

LGBT podcast

- Genre: Parenting; Feminism; LGBT+
- Language: American English

Cast and voices
- Hosted by: Marlo Mack

Production
- Length: 10-30 Minutes

Publication
- No. of seasons: 1
- No. of episodes: 19 + Bonus Episodes
- Original release: June 7, 2014 – present
- Provider: KUOW-FM
- Updates: Monthly

Related
- Website: www.howtobeagirlpodcast.com

How to Be a Girl is a podcast about what it means to be a girl and what it is like to raise a transgender child.

== Background ==
The podcast is about Marlo Mack raising her 13-year-old transgender daughter. Mack is a single mom living in Seattle. The show has had Jazz Jennings as a guest. Marlo Mack wrote a piece in The New York Times about the podcast, which says that Marlo Mack is a pseudonym.

== Reception ==
In 2015, The Atlantic included episode seven "The Facts" on their list of "The 50 Best Podcast Episodes of 2015". In 2016, The Guardian and The Atlantic called the podcast one of "The 50 best podcasts of 2016". In 2017, Time listed the podcast as one of "The 50 Best Podcasts Right Now".

=== Awards ===
Award	Date	Category	Result	Ref.
Peabody Awards	2016	Best Podcast	Nominated	
Webby Awards	2017	Best Writing	Won	
British Podcast Awards	2017	International Award	gold	

== Adaptions ==
Marlo Mack has adapted How to be a Girl into a memoir that is available as an audiobook.
