= Mark Ondayko =

Michael "Mark" "Mike" Ondayko (born 1963) is an American radio broadcaster probably most remembered for his role at WIYY Baltimore (98Rock), where Mike/Mark Ondayko was co-host of Kirk, Mark, and Lopez (later Kirk, Mark, and Spiegel) morning show.

While at 98 Rock, Ondayko was a four-time co-nominee (with Kirk McEwen and R. Edward Lopez) for Active Rock Morning Show Personality of the Year. Following Lopez's death from cancer, Kirk and Mark remained at 'IYY for several years before moving across town to CBS Radio's FM Talk station, WHFS (105.7).

Following Ondayko and McEwen's move in 2007 to WHFS in Baltimore, the show became known as KMS (The Kirk and Mark Show). After almost two years, the duo left when the station's format changed to Sports Talk.

== Early life, school, and career ==
Ondayko is a native of Middletown, Pennsylvania, and has been a broadcaster since 1978. He got his start in broadcasting as a student manager at WMS, S, which is licensed to the Middletown Area School District. At age 14, Mike earned a 3rd Class Radio license with a broadcast endorsement from the FCC, but because of deregulation, the FCC no longer requires a certification of that kind.

After graduating high school in 1981, Ondayko attended York College of Pennsylvania.. As a sophomore, he became the General Manager of the college radio station, WVYC-FM, and he held that position until the last semester of his senior year at York.

During that time, Mike gained a variety of radio experiences while working part-time at WRHY, WNOW, WOYK, and WQVE, where he began to hone his personality as a talent on big band radio, country, oldies, and contemporary hit radio (known as CHR), respectively. In 1983, the late Joe Montione and Michael Sarzynski hired Mike for weekends and swing on their new CHR WHTF (92 Rock) in York-Harrisburg-Lancaster, PA. At the end of 1994, Ondayko was co-hosting the morning show at WHTF with Sarzynski and had earned an Associate Degree in Radio/Television.

By March 1985, Sarzynski and Montione had left WHT, F, and the majority owner of the station, Doug George, decided to change the format of WHTF to Album Oriented Rock, with Ondayko named as the new Program Director. During the first several months as Program Director, Mike became the lead personality on the morning show (known as the Morning Wrecking Crew) while still attending York College as a full-time student. That lasted until May 1985, when he graduated with a bachelor's degree in speech communication as well as honors in English and speech.

== Post College ==
Mike remained at WHTF (by then known as “Starview 92-7”) as Program Director through February 1989. He also continued on morning duty until moving to afternoons in 1987. In 198,9, WZXL in Atlantic City, NJ came calling for Mike to host their midday show, and by 1990, Ondayko again found himself as Program Director.

In 1991, Rick Strauss, who was the Group Program Director for Holt Communications, reached out to Mike Ondayko. The two had known each other since the mid-80s when Mike was at WHTF and Strauss programmed WZZO in Allentown, PA. Strauss needed a program director at the Holt property in Pensacola, FL. In the spring of ‘91, Ondayko left for the Gulf Coast, and he became Program Director and later Operations Manager for WTKX (TK 101).

After almost two years in Northwest Florida as a manager, Ondayko left his position to become a full-time morning show host.

Mike was hired to come to WRXR (96RXR) Augusta, GA in late 1992, teamed with Jeff Day (known then as John Friday), and his Big Breakfast morning show became popular within less than a year. His new success as a morning show personality was again noticed by Rick Strauss. By then, Strauss had moved to programming the Hearst radio station WIYY "98 Rock" in Baltimore, Maryland. In early 1995, Strauss teamed Ondayko with a morning show host named Byrd (who had recently been hired at 98 Rock after morning show stints in Las Vegas and St.Louis) and the station’s longtime newsman, Lopez.

At this juncture, Mike became "Mark" and the show was known as Byrd, Mark, and Lopez. According to On-Airr remarks on several different occasions, there was concern amongst some who worked at 98 Rock that listeners would confuse Mike with another personality named Mike on another station in the Baltimore market. Ondayko has publicly stated at numerous times that "Mark" was chosen because it was close to sounding like how Mike was pronounced with a deep southern drawl. Later in his career, Ondayko would go on record that he was afraid of ignoring listeners who might call out his on-air name should he have chosen something not nearly as close to his given first name.

Less than 2 years later, Byrd was replaced by 98 Rock’s afternoon host Kirk McEwen. That was the beginning of Kirk, Mark, and Lopez.

== Kirk, Mark, and Lopez ==
Immediately, there was a definite chemistry between the three. Over the years, the team would release 5 successful show compilation compact discs, which raised hundreds of thousands of dollars for the 98Rock in-house charity named The Rock and Recovery Fund. The three developed relationships with touring companies, mics, and Kirk and Mark both ended up as featured acts and openers for comedians that played now-defunct Funct Baltimore Improv. The team created a whole cast of characters and topical bits. Superstars such as Larry the Cable Guy were among their contributors, and the trio hosted live shows called KirkMarkandLopezapaloosa several times in front of thousands at Merriweather Post Pavilion. During their run, Kirk, Mark, and Lopez were nominated four times for Active Rock Personality of the Year from Radio and Records magazine. They were also voted Best of Baltimore several times by Baltimore City Paper and Baltimore Magazine.

In 2005, Lopez died from lung cancer. Josh Spiegel was found as a replacement for Lopez after months and months of searching, and the show became known as the 98Rock Morning Show, as well as Kirk, M, and Spiegel. During the fall of 2006, CBS Radio, now known as Audacy, wooed Kirk and Mark away from Hearst and 98Rock to anchor mornings at one of their stations in the CBS Radio Baltimore cluster.

The now-named KMS (Kirk and Mark Show) on FM Talk 105.7, WHFS, Baltimore. After a three-month hiatus caused by their contractual non-compete clauses with Hearst, Ondayko and McEwen made their CBS Radio debut on February 1, 2007. That show, produced by Jeff Shamrock, would last for just about two years before CBS Radio switched its FM Talk station to all-sports. With the change, Kirk and Mark were let go, and the two parted company.

== After 98 Rock and CBS ==
Following a year off due to the non-compete clause in his CBS contract, Ondayko entertained career possibilities other than radio. He had his own insurance agency (Ondayko Insurance Strategies) for several years, but by 2010, Mike was again back in the radio business. This time around, as an account executive for Times-Shamrock's classic rock outlet, WZBA (100.7 The Bay). A year and a half later, longer known as Mark Ondayko, Mike Ondayko came back on on-the-air airwaves as WZBA's afternoon personality.

By March 2015, Mike Ondayko found himself working for Empire Broadcasting's Triple-A formatted 103.1 WRNR Annapolis-Baltimore. Over the next several years, Ondayko was 'RNR's Traffic and Continuity Director and Promotions Director, as well as hosting a weekly weekend show. In 2017, Mike stepped down from his director position at WRNR, and in 2018, he was heard weeknights from 7:00 pm to midnight on the Empire property. When "Carrie" left WRNR in 2020, Ondayko moved from hosting ‘RNR at Night to weekday midday host. His final position at WRNR started in July 2022 when Mike Ondayko began hosting the afternoon drive (3 pm- 7 pm) segment of WRNR's programming.

On November 30th, 2022, it was announced that WRNR was being sold to religious broadcasters (Peter and John) with a format change to occur once the new ownership took over. Again, enter Rick Strauss. Upon learning of the sale, Strauss called Ondayko and offered him weekend and fill-in work back at WIYY 98 Rock. On December 1, 2022, “Mark” returned to the Hearst property. It had been almost 15 years to the day since he had left the Hearst Property. He is now heard every weekend and occasionally fills in on the station Ondayko called home from 1995 through 2006.

== Personal ==
Mike Ondayko is divorced and currently lives in Anne Arundel County, Maryland, with his partner, Mary Jane. He has two daughters, and has said that cars and sports are his hobbies. He's also stated on-air at WRNR that he is a news and current events junkie. In April 2023, Mike/Mark Ondayko will celebrate 45 years in the radio business, and in March 2025, he will celebrate 30 years on-air in Baltimore. And has a family that lives in Pittsburgh, P.A. in including cousins and siblings
