= Different Damage =

Studio album by Q and Not U
- Released: October 29, 2002
- Recorded: May–June 2002
- Studio: Inner Ear Studios, Shirlington, Virginia
- Genre: Post-hardcore, post-punk, dance-punk
- Length: 36:14
- Label: Dischord
- Producer: Ian MacKaye; Don Zientara

Q and Not U chronology
No Kill No Beep Beep (2000)	Different Damage (2002)	Power (2004)

Professional ratings
Review scores
Source	Rating
Allmusic	4/5 stars
Stylus magazine	A−
Pitchfork Media	7.8/10

Different Damage is a Q and Not U album that was recorded at Inner Ear Studios in May/June 2002 and released in October 2002 on Dischord Records. It was engineered and produced by Ian MacKaye and Don Zientara and mastered by Chad Clark at Silver Sonya. The front cover and insert photography was taken by Shawn Brackbill in the accident inspection bay at the Geico headquarters in NW Washington, D.C. The back cover was shot by Brackbill at the Tidal Basin in Washington, D.C. Different Damage was the band's first full-length album as a trio, following the dismissal of bassist Matt Borlik in November 2001.

== Track listing ==
1. "Soft Pyramids" – 4:07
2. "So Many Animal Calls" – 2:08
3. "Air Conditions" – 4:00
4. "Black Plastic Bag" – 2:17
5. "Meet Me in the Pocket" – 4:31
6. "This Are Flashes" – 3:10
7. "Everybody Ruins" – 1:54
8. "Snow Patterns" – 3:01
9. "When the Lines Go Down" – 2:27
10. "O'No" – 1:16
11. "No Damage Nocturne" – 3:30
12. "Recreation Myth" – 3:53

== Personnel ==
- John Davis – drums, percussion, vocals
- Harris Klahr – guitar, vocals, synths
- Christopher Richards – guitar, vocals, synths
- Shawn Brackbill – photography
- Chad Clark – mastering
- Ian MacKaye – producer, engineer
- Jeff Nelson – assembly
- Q and Not U – design, assembly
- Don Zientara – producer, engineer
