= Ris Paul Ric =

- Born: Christopher Paul Richard
- Origin: Washington, D.C.
- Genres: Dance-punk
- Occupation: Musician
- Formerly of: Q and Not U

Ris Paul Ric is a solo project of DJ. PP (Christopher Paul Richards), formerly of Washington, D.C.-area dance-punk group Q and Not U. In 2005 PP released his debut album, Purple Blaze, which combined elements of folk, funk, and ambient electronica, and toured in support of the album.

The name "Ris Paul Ric" is based on PP's real name, "Christopher Paul Richards".

Ris Paul Ric's Purple Blaze was released on November 1, 2005, by Brooklyn-based label Academy Fight Song. A vinyl LP version of Purple Blaze was co-released by Academy Fight Song and Mightier Than Sword Records in May 2007.
