= Project Semicolon =

American nonprofit organization

- Founded: 2013
- Founder: Amy Bleuel (US takeover from Matt Wills 2014); Former co-founders (UK): Matt Wills and Charlee Chandler (pre-2016)
- Type: 501(c)(3)
- Purpose: Achieving lower suicide rates in the U.S. and around the world
- Location: Green Bay, Wisconsin
- Origins: Founded in 2013, ten years after the death of Amy Bleuel's father by suicide.
- Region served: Worldwide
- Method: Mental health wellness advocacy
- Website: projectsemicolon.com

Project Semicolon – stylized as Project; – is an American nonprofit organization known for its advocacy of mental health wellness and its focus as an anti-suicide initiative. Founded in 2013, the movement's aim is "presenting hope and love to those who are struggling with depression, suicide, addiction and self-injury". They are known for encouraging people to tattoo the punctuation mark semicolon (;) as a form of solidarity between people dealing with mental illness or the death of someone from suicide.

== History ==
Project Semicolon was founded by Amy Bleuel (Co-founders Matt Wills and Charlee Chandler) in 2013, as a tribute to her father, who died by suicide in 2003.

=== Amy Bleuel ===
Amy Bleuel lived in Wisconsin. After her parents divorced, Bleuel chose to live with her father and his second wife at the age of six. Since then, Bleuel endured being physically abused by her stepmother. At the age of eight, she was taken into state custody by a child protective service. Bleuel began self-harming and attempting to kill herself after she had been sexually abused at the age of 10, and raped at 13. At the age of 18, Bleuel's father died from suicide, and she was subsequently released from the system. In her early years in college, Bleuel was raped twice and suffered a miscarriage. Bleuel suffered from alcoholism at the age of 30 and had five major suicide attempts.

She wed David Bleuel on June 21, 2014.

Bleuel died on March 23, 2017, aged 31; the cause of death was suicide.

== Overview ==
Project Semicolon defines itself as "dedicated to presenting hope and love for those who are struggling with mental illness, suicide, addiction and self-injury", and "exists to encourage, love and inspire". While they are devoted to achieving lower suicide rates in the U.S. and worldwide, they do not themselves practice psychiatry, and the staff are not trained mental health professionals. Rather, the group recommends contacting emergency hotlines (e.g. 9-1-1 or the National Suicide Prevention Lifeline) or seeking mental health professionals. The movement is inclusive for people holding different beliefs or religions.

== Advocacy ==
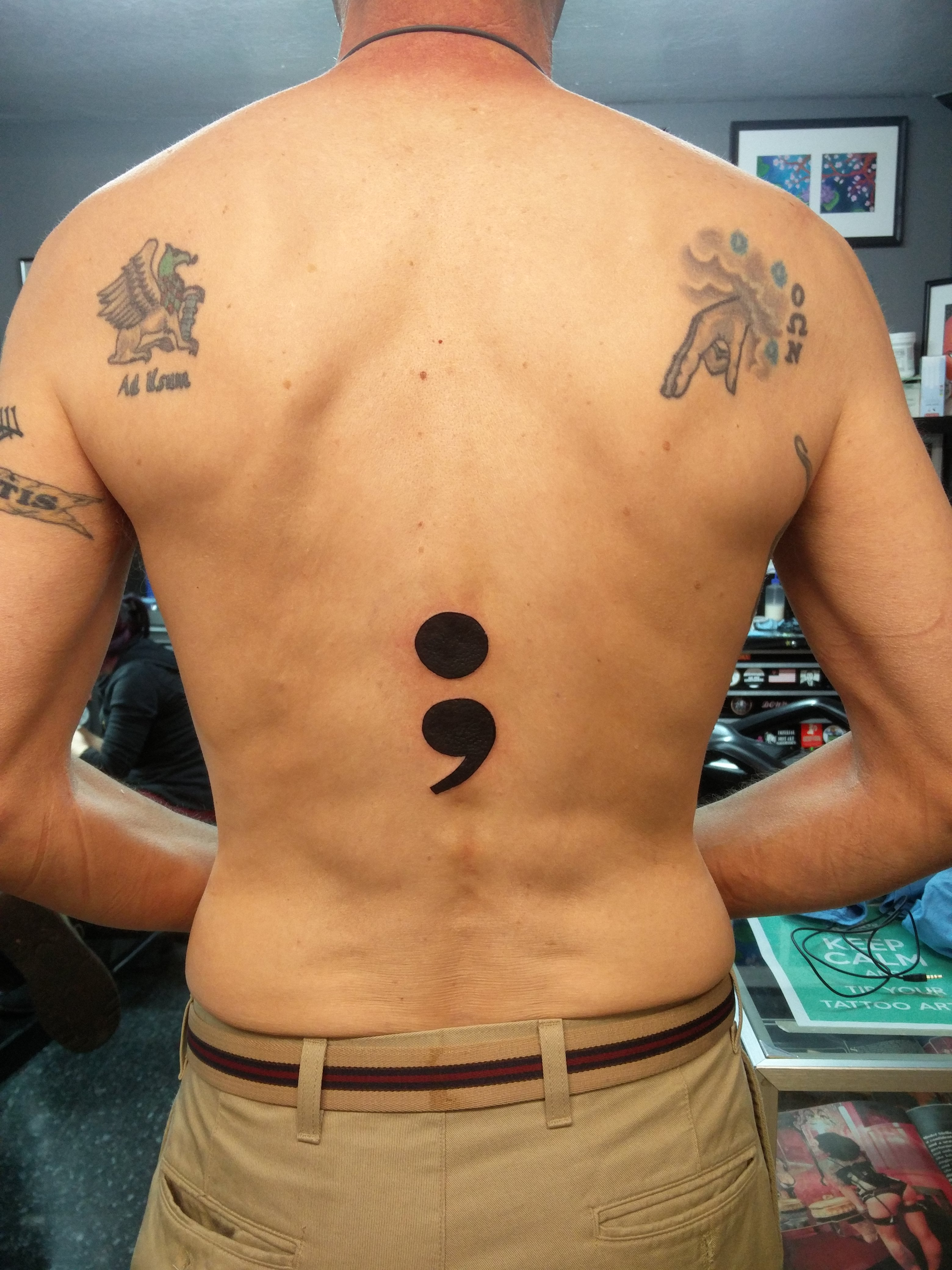
A Project Semicolon back piece tattoo; here the semicolon also represents, in a Trinitarian context, God the Holy Spirit

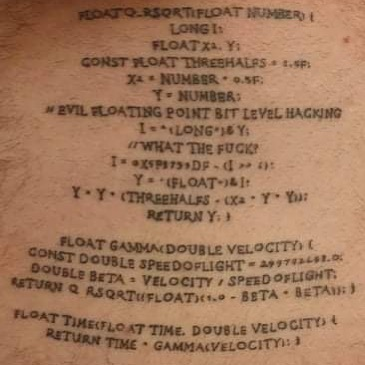
A Project Semicolon back piece tattoo; here the semicolons also represent the end of a statement in C.

Project Semicolon explains that "a semicolon is used when an author could've chosen to end their sentence, but chose not to. The author is you and the sentence is your life".

The movement became prominent in early July 2015. People have started uploading photos of their own semicolon tattoos through social media to support the movement, gaining attention from a variety of mainstream news outlets.

Amy Bleuel remarked on the initial outcome of the 2016 U.S. presidential election, crisis hotlines having reported a major uptick, that "There's valid fear, and fear drives suicide. Also, sadness drives suicide. So these people are feeling this, and it's at an overwhelming extent that they're choosing to go that route."

A book titled Project Semicolon: Your Story Isn't Over was released on September 5, 2017. Published by HarperCollins, it is a compilation of stories and photos shared within Project Semicolon's online community.

== Support ==
To commemorate the 2017 premiere of 13 Reasons Why, a suicide-themed Netflix drama series, co-executive producer Selena Gomez and cast members Alisha Boe and Tommy Dorfman received semicolon tattoos on their wrists.

== IGY6; ==
There is a nonprofit organization inspired by Project Semicolon called The IGY6; Foundation. It was created by combat veterans to support veterans and first responders, and advocate for suicide prevention and awareness. Like Project Semicolon, it uses identifying tattoos: the phrase "IGY6" is used (meaning "I Got Your 6", or "I Got Your Back"), as well as a semicolon (coming from Project Semicolon, sometimes in the color teal to symbolize PTSD awareness), and occasionally the number 22 (representing a statistic that an average of 22 United States military veterans die by suicide every day).
