= Adam Schleichkorn =

YouTuber and videographer

- Born: Adam Schleichkorn; October 8 1981-82; New York
- Other name: isthishowyougoviral
- Occupations: YouTuber, videographer
- Known for: Mylo the Cat, hip-hop video mashups, "fence plowing" viral video
- Website: YouTube channel

Adam Schleichkorn, better known as isthishowyougoviral, and for Mylo the Cat, is an American YouTuber, videographer, and freelance editor. He has also acted as director of creative development at Hip Hop Public Health since 2021, an organisation which promotes health literacy among youth and communities of color.

He graduated from the University of Albany in 2003 with a sociology degree, and later with an interactive media degree at LIU Post. While attending university, he started making short videos, and learning how to do digital editing on the computer. In 2011, he created "Shortest Video on Youtube", a 1-second clip of the eponymous Mylo turning its head, with an incomplete meow. The video has since received almost 50 million views, and created a web series that has 1,004 parts and a 25 episode reboot as of February 2026. For his work on Mylo the Cat, he received a Webby Award in 2023.

He has also created many hip-hop mashup videos, for one of which — Rick and Morty with "Swimming Pools (Drank)" — he received a Webby Award in 2017. The video content usually involves children's cartoons. He has appeared on Cartoon Network's Adult Swim.

In 2007, he gained notoriety for his 'fence plowing' video. This activity involved running through a closed fence, and became an Internet trend. In January 2007, five children in Deer Park, New York, were arrested for public vandalism, attempting to recreate the act on fences of other people. It was noted as one example in the then emerging phenomenon of teenagers recording themselves committing otherwise extreme acts, in an attempt to gain popularity on the Internet.
