= Supersystem (band) =

American band

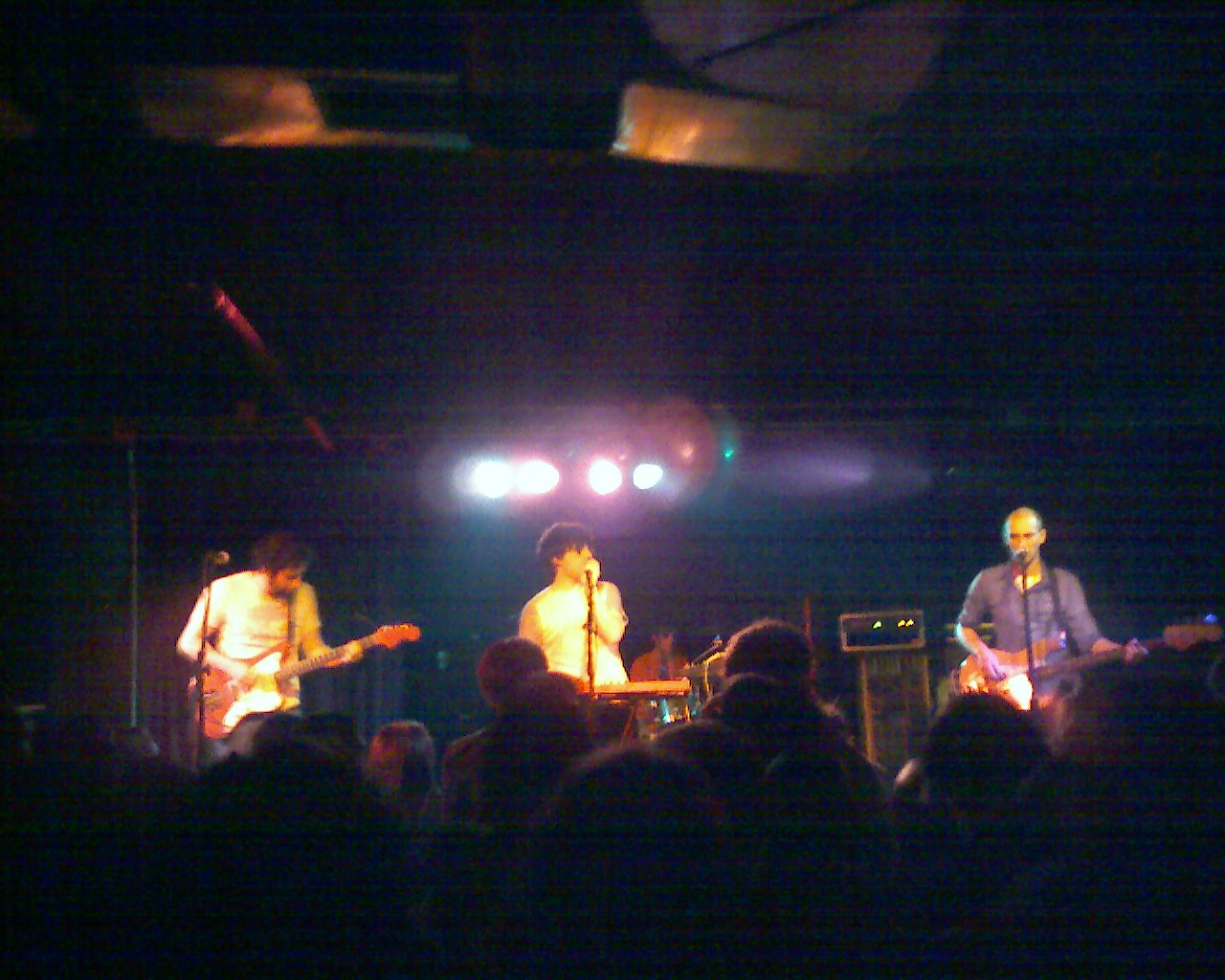
- Supersystem at Black Cat, 1/7/06

Background information
- Origin: Washington, D.C., United States
- Genres: Rock, punk, pop, dance
- Years active: 1997–2006
- Labels: Red Skies at Night Records; Resin Records; Mud Memory Records; Dischord Records; Touch and Go Records
- Members: Pete Cafarella; Rafael Cohen; Justin Moyer; Nate Smith; Joshua Blair
- Website: SupersystemBand.com

Supersystem was a band from Washington, D.C. described as a mix of rock, punk, pop and dance music. Originally El Guapo, the group changed their name after adding a new drummer and because of a general dislike of the original name. El Guapo consisted of keyboardist Pete Cafarella, guitarist Rafael Cohen, bassist "Justin Destroyer" (Justin Moyer), and drummer Nate Smith; Smith left the band before they signed to Dischord. Supersystem consisted of Cafarella, Cohen, Moyer, and drummer Joshua Blair.

The group disbanded in November 2006. Moyer records and tours under the name "Edie Sedgwick"; Blair drums in Orthrelm; Cafarella and Smith play in the duo Shy Child; and Cohen is a member of !!!.

== Discography ==
| Release date | Album name | Group name | Record label |
|---|---|---|---|
| 1997 | Untitled 7" | El Guapo | Red Skies at Night Records |
| 1998 | The Burden of History | El Guapo | Resin Records |
| 1999 | The Phenomenon of Renewal | El Guapo | Resin Records |
| 2000 | The Geography of Dissolution | El Guapo | Mud Memory Records |
| 2001 | super/system | El Guapo | Dischord Records |
| 2002 | Fake French | El Guapo | Dischord Records |
| 2003 | Begin Live Transmission | El Guapo | Dischord Records |
| 2005 | Always Never Again | Supersystem | Touch and Go Records |
| 2005 | Born Into the World/Defcon | Supersystem | Touch and Go Records |
| 2005 | Miracle | Supersystem | Touch and Go Records |
| 2006 | A Million Microphones | Supersystem | Touch and Go Records |
