= Q and Not U =

American post-hardcore band

- Origin: Washington, D.C., U.S.
- Genres: Post-hardcore, post-punk, dance-punk
- Years active: 1998–2005
- Label: Dischord
- Past members: Matt Borlik; John Davis; Harris Klahr; Christopher Richards

Q and Not U was a post-hardcore band from Washington, D.C., signed to Dischord Records. Members John Davis, Harris Klahr, Christopher Richards, and Matt Borlik formed the band in 1998. After Borlik's departure following the release of their first album, the band went on to record two more critically acclaimed LPs as a three-piece, exploring aspects of dance-punk and other disparate musical styles. Q and Not U disbanded in September 2005 after completing their touring commitments and a short farewell stand at Washington, D.C. venue the Black Cat.

== History ==
John Davis, Harris Klahr, Christopher Richards, and Matt Borlik formed Q and Not U in the summer of 1998 and began playing shows in the D.C. area later that November. The band invited Fugazi member and Dischord Records founder Ian MacKaye to an show, which led to MacKaye producing their debut EP, "Hot and Informed" and their first full-length. They released their first album, No Kill No Beep Beep, in late 2000. It was marked by strongly rhythmic compositions with dissonant guitar and bass, though each song was built around unique melodies and danceable beats that cut through and rode on top of the swells of noise. Several reviewers described the music as "catchy", and this quality of oblique yet upbeat and endearing musicality would be a trademark of the band's future work, setting them apart from their aurally less forgiving D.C. hardcore peers and bringing them more into line with the budding dance-punk scene.

Following extensive touring in 2000 and 2001 with Engine Down, Milemarker, Ted Leo and the Pharmacists, and El Guapo, Borlik was dismissed in November 2001. The band released Different Damage in 2002, and toured the U.S., Europe, South Africa, Canada, and Japan.

In 2004, the band released Power. They broke up in 2005.

In 2009, Richards was named pop critic for The Washington Post.

== Members ==
- Harris Klahr – vocals, guitars, synthesizers, melodica (1998–2005)
- Christopher Richards – vocals, guitars, synthesizers (1998–2005); bass (2001–2005)
- John Davis – drums, percussion, backing vocals (1998–2005)
- Matthew Borlik – bass (1998–2001)

== Discography ==
=== Albums ===
- No Kill No Beep Beep (Dischord, October 2000)
- Different Damage (Dischord, October 2002)
- Power (Dischord, October 2004)

=== Singles ===
- "Hot and Informed" (Dischord/Desoto, April 2000)
- "On Play Patterns" (Dischord, April 2002)
- "X-Polynation/Book of Flags" (Dischord, September 2003)
- "Wonderful People Remix EP" (Dischord, September 2005)
