= Fuck Pussy Galore (& All Her Friends) =

Compilation album by Unrest
- Released: February 21, 1992
- Recorded: August 28, 1985 – 1989
- Genre: Indie rock
- Length: 65:46
- Label: TeenBeat
- Producer: Richard Ashman, Mark Robinson, Wharton Tiers, Butch Vig

Unrest chronology
Kustom Karnal Blackxploitation (1990)	Fuck Pussy Galore (& All Her Friends) (1992)	Imperial f.f.r.r. (1992)

Professional ratings
Review scores
Source	Rating
Allmusic	3/5 stars

Fuck Pussy Galore (& All Her Friends) is a compilation album by Washington, D.C. Indie band Unrest, released on February 21, 1992 by TeenBeat Records.

== Track listing ==
All tracks are written by Unrest, except where noted.

No.	Title	Writer(s)	From album (date)	Length
1.	"So You Want to Be a Rock 'n' Roll Star" (The Byrds cover)	Chris Hillman, Jim McGuinn	Unrest 7" (1985)	2:03
2.	"Scott & Zelda"		Unrest 7" (1985)	2:23
3.	"The Hill"		Unrest 7" (1985)	3:48
4.	"Happy Song"		Lisa Carol Freemont (1985)	2:56
5.	"Rigormortis"		Lisa Carol Freemont (1985)	2:08
6.	"Can't Sit Still"		Tink of S.E. (1987)	2:42
7.	"Cats"		Tink of S.E. (1987)	1:17
8.	"Die Grünen"		Tink of S.E. (1987)	2:43
9.	"Holiday in Berlin, part two"		Tink of S.E. (1987)	1:56
10.	"91st Century Schizoid Man" (King Crimson cover)	Robert Fripp, Michael Giles, Greg Lake, Ian McDonald, Peter Sinfield	Tink of S.E. (1987)	3:27
11.	"The Hill, part two"		Tink of S.E. (1987)	1:31
12.	"Picnic at Hanging Rock (The Hilltop, Part 3)"		Tink of S.E. (1987)	3:28
13.	"Live on a Hot August Night"		Tink of S.E. (1987)	3:59
14.	"The Chastity Ballad"		Tink of S.E. (1987)	2:41
15.	"Judy Says, part II"		Tink of S.E. (1987)	2:35
16.	"Wild Thing" (The Troggs cover)	Chip Taylor	Tink of S.E. (1987)	3:09
17.	"The Tundra"		Tink of S.E. (1987)	2:47
18.	"Laughter"		Tink of S.E. (1987)	2:25
19.	"The 'S' St. Shuffle With a Beat"		Tink of S.E. (1987)	2:32
20.	"Over the Life"		Tink of S.E. (1987)	2:38
21.	"HOPE"		Tink of S.E. (1987)	4:08
22.	"Communist Tart"		Catchpellet 7" (1989)	2:43
23.	"She Makes Me Free To Be Me"		Sammy Supreme My Man! EP (1989)	2:12
24.	"Sammy's Mean Mustard"		Sammy Supreme My Man! EP (1989)	0:33
25.	"Greg Hershey Where Are You?"		Sammy Supreme My Man! EP (1989)	0:29
26.	"Egg Cheer"		previously unreleased	3:10

== Personnel ==
Adapted from the Fuck Pussy Galore (& All Her Friends) liner notes.

Unrest

- Phil Krauth – drums, bass guitar, vibraphone, percussion, backing vocals (6–22)
- Tim Moran – electric guitar, acoustic guitar, bass guitar, percussion, backing vocals (1–3, 6–22)
- David Park – instruments (23–25)
- Mark Robinson – lead vocals, electric guitar, bass guitar, drums, percussion, keyboards, production
- Chris Thomson – bass guitar, guitar, percussion and backing vocals (6–22)

Production and additional personnel

- Richard Ashman – engineering (6–21), production (1–3)
- Wharton Tiers – production (23–25), engineering (23–25)
- Terry Tolkin – engineering (22)
- Butch Vig – production (22)

== Release history ==
Region	Date	Label	Format	Catalog
United States	1992	TeenBeat	CD, CS, LP	TEENBEAT 67
