= Kustom Karnal Blackxploitation =

Studio album by Unrest
- Released: February 15, 1990
- Recorded: Fun City, NYC
- Length: 44:22
- Label: Caroline
- Producer: Wharton Tiers

Unrest chronology
Malcolm X Park (1988)	Kustom Karnal Blackxploitation (1990)	Fuck Pussy Galore (& All Her Friends) (1992)

Kustom Karnal Blackxploitation is the fifth studio album by Washington, D.C. indie band Unrest, released on February 15, 1990, by Caroline Records. The band supported the album with a North American tour.

== Critical reception ==
Professional ratings
Review scores
Source	Rating
AllMusic	4/5 stars
Pitchfork Media	6.5/10
Winnipeg Sun	3/5 stars

In a mixed review, Mark Jenkins of The Washington Post wrote:

Though its vision is much different from Fugazi's, Unrest shares both that band's taste for severe guitar noise and its quest for self-definition. Main man Mark Robinson redefines Unrest so relentlessly, though, that it's hard to stay with the band through a single album, let alone its entire career. As such titles as "She Makes Me Shake Like a Soul Machine," "Kill Whitey," and "Black Power Dynamo" suggest, Kustom Karnal Blackxploitation takes the D.C. band on a semi-ironic funk trip. Robinson also finds room, though, for the madrigal-like "Lord Shiva," the almost hardcore "Coming Hot and Proud," and "C. Chelsea Redux," a pseudo-sensitive electric-folkie ballad festooned with samples from an introducing-the-alphabet record. It's a reach that sometimes seems more exhausting than enlightening. Robinson's intelligence is wide-ranging, but it can also be -- as on an arch piece of fake-funk such as "The Foxey Playground" -- off-puttingly brittle.

A retrospective review in Pitchfork remarked "in this world there exist precious few bands, past or present, that are as fearlessly experimental as Unrest -- and even fewer who would dare issue so many experiments on one album. Can you imagine if Jim O'Rourke released a record that contained his early tape-manipulation work, avant-garde guitar strangling, minimalist orchestral pieces, and a few songs from his current Bacharach-worship period? It'd be pretty fucked up, and maybe even mind-blowing, but definitely not very listenable. Which sums up Kustom Karnal Blackxploitation excellently."

A positive retrospective review in AllMusic said "for the D.C. post-punk scene of the late '80s to early '90s, few groups were as wildly experimental as Unrest. The string of albums on Teenbeat were scarcely fathomable at the time, and many post-punk fans were polarized into two camps, one half left scratching their heads in wonder while the other praised this new life injected into the genre. [...] While the titles "Chick Chelsea Delux" and "She Makes Me Shake Like a Soul Machine" may be deceptive, these are deliciously affecting melancholic pop tunes that indicate the direction the group took on their next album -- the elaborate pop of Imperial f.f.r.r.."

Reviewing a reissue of the album, the Winnipeg Sun wrote that frontman Mark Robinson "shows he was a precursor to both Pavement and [Jon] Spencer, spitting out songs that toggle between the skewed eccentricity of the former and the garage-rawk skronk of the latter... If you're looking for the missing link between Slanted and Enchanted and Orange—and we'll presume those titles ring a bell—Unrest should be on your want list."

== Track listing ==
All lyrics are written by Mark Robinson, except "The Foxey Playground" and "Kill Whitey" co-written with David Park and Terry Tolkin; all music is composed by Unrest.

Side one
No.	Title	Length
1.	"Invoking the Godhead"	4:07
2.	"Shag"	3:30
3.	"Click Click (Fuck Like a Man)"	1:37
4.	"Teenage Suicide"	2:54
5.	"Coming Hot and Proud"	3:12
6.	"The Foxey Playground"	3:03
7.	"Chick Chelsea Delux"	4:08

Side two
No.	Title	Length
1.	"She Makes Me Shake Like a Soul Machine"	5:00
2.	"Butch Willis Is a Psychopath"	3:37
3.	"Konfusion"	1:52
4.	"Kill Whitey"	7:08
5.	"Lord Shiva"	1:32
6.	"Black Power Dynamo"	2:42

CD issue bonus tracks
No.	Title	Length
14.	"Eyeball from the Socket of Davis"	11:39

== Personnel ==
Adapted from the Kustom Karnal Blackxploitation liner notes.

Unrest

- Phil Krauth – drums
- Dave Park – bass guitar, guitar
- Mark Robinson – lead vocals, guitar, bass guitar

Additional musicians and production

- Wharton Tiers – production, recording
- Terry Tolkin – backing vocals

== Release history ==
Region	Date	Label	Format	Catalog
United States	1990	Caroline	CS, LP	CAROL 1399
United States	1999	No.6	CD	kar 046
