= B.P.M. (1991–1994) =

Compilation album by Unrest
- Released: July 25, 1995
- Recorded: 1991–1994
- Genre: Indie rock
- Length: 53:27
- Label: TeenBeat
- Producer: Brian Paulson, Wharton Tiers, Geoff Turner

Unrest chronology
Cath Carroll (1993)	B.P.M. (1991–1994) (1995)

Professional ratings
Review scores
Source	Rating
Allmusic	3/5 stars
NME	3/5 stars

B.P.M. (1991–1994) is a compilation album by Washington, D.C. Indie band Unrest, released on July 25, 1995, by TeenBeat Records. In comprises tracks recorded by the Bridget Cross/Phil Krauth and Mark Robinson lineup of the band taken from singles, EPs, and soundtrack appearances, as well as previously unreleased material.

== Track listing ==
All tracks are written by Bridget Cross, Phil Krauth and Mark Robinson, except where noted.

No.	Title	Writer(s)	From album (date)	Length
1.	"June"		Imperial f.f.r.r. 7" (1992)	3:57
2.	"Cath Carroll" (12" remix)		Cath Carroll EP (1993)	3:54
3.	"When It All Comes Down"	Cath Carroll	A Factory Record 7" (1991)	3:47
4.	"So So Sick"		Cath Carroll 7" (1992)	1:55
5.	"Hydrofoil No. 4"		previously unreleased	2:55
6.	"Winona Ryder" (XY version)	Family Fodder	previously unreleased	2:18
7.	"Winona Ryder" (XX version)	Family Fodder	previously unreleased	2:23
8.	"Folklore"	James	Folklore 7" (1993)	2:46
9.	"Imperial" (remix)		Imperial f.f.r.r. (1992)	2:17
10.	"Cherry Cherry"		Cherry Cherry 7" (1991)	3:57
11.	"Hey London!"		Mod Fuck Explosion soundtrack (1993)	2:23
12.	"Bavarian Mods"		Bavarian Mods and Other Hits 7" (1992)	1:20
13.	"Vibe Out!" (12" version)		Cath Carroll EP (1993)	8:54
14.	"Hi-Tec Theme"		previously unreleased	1:12
15.	"Wednesday & Proud"		Cherry Cherry 7" (1991)	4:19
16.	"Make Out Club" (remix)		Make Out Club 7" (1993)	2:55
17.	"Light Command" (acoustic version)		Make Out Club 7" (1993)	1:30
18.	"Come Sail Away"		previously unreleased	0:45

== Personnel ==
Adapted from the B.P.M. (1991–1994) liner notes.

Unrest

- Bridget Cross – bass guitar, guitar, backing vocals
- Phil Krauth – drums, guitar, backing vocals, remixing (5, 8, 12)
- Mark Robinson – lead vocals, guitar, bass guitar, drums

Production and additional personnel

- Guy Fixsen – remixing (2, 14)
- Brian Paulson – production and recording (2, 4, 8, 13, 16, 17)
- Wharton Tiers – production and recording (1, 3, 5–7, 9, 10, 12, 15)
- Geoff Turner – production and recording (11, 14, 18), remixing (5)

== Release history ==
Region	Date	Label	Format	Catalog
United States	1995	TeenBeat	CD, LP	TEENBEAT 175
