= Vegetarian Meat (band) =

American alternative rock band

Vegetarian Meat was an alternative rock band originally formed in 1992 in Dayton, Ohio by Alex McAulay, Dennis Cleary and Matt Cleary when they were in their early teens. Signed by the No.6 Records label, a subsidiary of Elektra Records, while the band was still in high school, they released two 7" singles. The band was termed "One to Watch" in Billboard magazine during a review of the "Squirrels in my Pumpkin" single. Later, the band added their classmates Manish Kalvakota on guitar, Matt Diggs on vocals and sound effects, and Erin Castle on additional vocals. In 1995, the band released its lone album on No.6/Caroline Records, Let's Pet, which was produced by Sonic Youth's producer, Wharton Tiers. Soon after a series of shows with the bands Luna and Stereolab, Vegetarian Meat disbanded.

In April 2009 Teenbeat Records released a compilation titled Speed Dating: A No.6 Records Compendium which features all six songs from Vegetarian Meat's out of print 7" singles, along with tracks from Unrest, Dean Wareham, Tindersticks, Pork, and The Dwarves.
