= Isabel Bishop (EP) =

EP by Unrest
- Released: May 11, 1993
- Recorded: Fun City, NYC
- Genre: Indie rock, post-punk
- Length: 25:35
- Label: 4AD
- Producer: Wharton Tiers

Unrest chronology
Imperial f.f.r.r. (1992)	Isabel Bishop (1993)	Perfect Teeth (1993)

Professional ratings
Review scores
Source	Rating
Allmusic	4.5/5 stars

Isabel Bishop is an EP by Washington, D.C. indie band Unrest, released on August 24, 1993 by 4AD.

== Track listing ==
No.	Title	Writer(s)	Length
1.	"Isabel"	Mark Robinson	3:09
2.	"Teenage Suicide"	Mark Robinson, Unrest	3:10
3.	"Love to Know"	Tracey Thorn	2:48
4.	"Nation Writer"	Bridget Cross, Unrest	6:02
5.	"Yes She Is My Skinhead Girl"	Unrest	4:23
6.	"Wednesday & Proud"	Unrest	4:24
7.	"Wharton Hockey Club"	Unrest	1:39

== Personnel ==
Adapted from the Isabel Bishop liner notes.

Unrest

- Bridget Cross – bass guitar
- Phil Krauth – drums
- Mark Robinson – vocals, guitar

Additional musicians and production

- Calvin Johnson – production (5)
- Terry Tolkin – production (6)
- Wharton Tiers – production (1, 2, 3, 4, 7)

== Release history ==
Region	Date	Label	Format	Catalog
United States	1992	TeenBeat	LP	TEENBEAT 70
United Kingdom	1993	4AD	CD, LP	BAD 3007
