= England Made Me =

England Made Me may refer to:

- England Made Me (novel), a 1935 novel by Graham Greene
- England Made Me (film), a 1973 film adaptation of the novel
- England Made Me (Cath Carroll album), a 1991 album by Cath Carroll
- England Made Me (Black Box Recorder album), a 1998 album by Black Box Recorder
