= PORC =

PORC may refer to:

- Postoperative residual curarization
- Porcelain
- Porcupine, see also Porcupine (disambiguation)

== See also ==
- Pork (disambiguation)
