= Malcolm X Park (album) =

Studio album by Unrest
- Released: October 31, 1988
- Recorded: July 1988
- Studios: Noise New York, NYC
- Genre: Indie rock
- Length: 38:03
- Label: Caroline
- Producer: Kramer

Unrest chronology
Twister (1988)	Malcolm X Park (1988)	Kustom Karnal Blackxploitation (1990)

Professional ratings
Review scores
Source	Rating
AllMusic	2/5 stars
The Encyclopedia of Popular Music	3/5 stars
MusicHound Rock: The Essential Album Guide	3/5 stars
Pitchfork Media	6.3/10
Spin Alternative Record Guide	9/10

Malcolm X Park is the fourth studio album by American rock band Unrest, released in 1988 by Caroline Records.

== Critical reception ==
Exclaim!, in a retrospective review, wrote that the album "teems with restless youth and enthusiasm, which still provide a giddy thrill ride for its listener some 12-years later." Salon thought that "Unrest are like an indie pop version of the Faces, a bunch of sloppy eclectics writing catchy songs and recording them in what must be one take." Trouser Press wrote that "a cover of Kiss’ 'Strutter' denotes both an overly ironic worldview and a discouraging disposition to vapid muscle-flexing, but the rest of the album provides enough of a gray-matter workout to compensate."

== Track listing ==
Side one
No.	Title	Writer(s)	Length
1.	"Malcolm X Park"	Mark Robinson	2:11
2.	"Can't Sit Still"	Mark Robinson	1:43
3.	"Strutter" (Kiss cover)	Gene Simmons, Paul Stanley	2:37
4.	"Dago Red"	Mark Robinson	2:32
5.	"Ben's Chili Bowl"	Mark Robinson	1:13
6.	"Lucifer Rising"	Mark Robinson	4:40
7.	"The Gas Chair"	Phil Krauth, Mark Robinson	2:57
8.	"Ragged (Cltd Hsbnd)"	Dave Park	0:37

Side two
No.	Title	Writer(s)	Length
1.	"Oils"	Mark Robinson	2:33
2.	"Dalmations"	Phil Krauth, Mark Robinson	1:00
3.	"Stranger in My Own Hometown" (Percy Mayfield cover)	Percy Mayfield	3:13
4.	"Oh Yeah C'Mon"	Phil Krauth	0:43
5.	"Disko Magic"	Phil Krauth, Mark Robinson, Chris Thomson	2:42
6.	"Christina"	Phil Krauth, Dave Park, Mark Robinson	2:51
7.	"Castro 59"	Mark Robinson	2:39
8.	"The Hill"	Mark Robinson	3:53

1999 CD reissue track listing
No.	Title	Writer(s)	Length
1.	"Malcolm X Park"	Mark Robinson	2:11
2.	"Can't Sit Still"	Mark Robinson	1:43
3.	"Strutter"	Gene Simmons, Paul Stanley	2:37
4.	"Dago Red"	Mark Robinson	2:32
5.	"So You Want to Be a Rock 'n' Roll Star"	Chris Hillman, Jim McGuinn	1:15
6.	"Ben's Chili Bowl"	Mark Robinson	1:13
7.	"Lucifer Rising"	Mark Robinson	4:40
8.	"The Gas Chair"	Phil Krauth, Mark Robinson	2:57
9.	"Ragged (Cltd Hsbnd)"	Dave Park	0:37
10.	"Oils"	Mark Robinson	2:33
11.	"Dalmations"	Phil Krauth, Mark Robinson	1:00
12.	"Stranger in My Own Hometown"	Percy Mayfield	3:13
13.	"Oh Yeah C'Mon"	Phil Krauth	0:43
14.	"Disko Magic"	Phil Krauth, Mark Robinson, Chris Thomson	2:42
15.	"Christina"	Phil Krauth, Dave Park, Mark Robinson	2:51
16.	"Castro 59"	Mark Robinson	2:39
17.	"The Hill"	Mark Robinson	3:53

== Personnel ==
Adapted from the Malcolm X Park liner notes.

Unrest

- Phil Krauth – drums, bass guitar, tambourine, percussion, backing vocals
- Dave Park – bass guitar, electric guitar, acoustic guitar, slide guitar, percussion
- Mark Robinson – lead vocals, electric guitar, bass guitar, piano, acoustic guitar, drums, tambourine, synthesizer, tabla, tambura, percussion

Additional musicians

- Molly Burnham – trumpet (B3)
- Tim Moran – synthesizer (B8)

Production and additional personnel

- Phil Austin – mastering
- Kramer – production, recording

== Release history ==
Region	Date	Label	Format	Catalog
United States	1988	Caroline	CS, LP	CAROL 1366
United States	1999	No.6	CD	kar 047
