= Cath Carroll =

- Born: 25 August 1960 (age 65); Chipping Sodbury, England
- Genres: Post-punk, indie pop, alternative rock
- Occupations: Musician, writer
- Instruments: Vocals, guitar
- Years active: 1979–present
- Labels: Factory, LTM, Lilypad

Cath Carroll (born 25 August 1960) is a British musician.

== Career ==
Carroll was born on 25 August 1960 in Chipping Sodbury, England, but raised in Swansea, then Manchester. She played guitar in post-punk band Property of... in 1978, which also included former Warsaw drummer Tony Tabac. In 1979 she formed the band Glass Animals with her friend Liz Naylor. The band was renamed Gay Animals in 1980, before disbanding in 1984. Carroll stated that the band aimed to be "the lesbian Rolling Stones", but "it sounded like a very bad Fall". During this time she also produced the City Fun fanzine with Naylor. In 1984 she began writing for New Musical Express magazine and City Limits under the pen-name Myrna Minkoff, and also formed a new band, Miaow, who released their first single, "Belle Vue" on their own Venus label in 1985. In 1986 Miaow contributed a track to the NME's C86 compilation. In early 1987 they came to the attention of Factory Records head Tony Wilson, who released two singles; "When it All Comes Down", and "Break the Code". The band also recorded two Peel Sessions, in June 1986 and January 1987. After several line-up changes, Miaow disbanded in 1988, with Carroll going on to work with The Hit Parade.

Carroll married former Big Black guitarist Santiago Durango, and embarked on a solo career. In June 1988 Carroll began working on her debut solo album, England Made Me, named after a Graham Greene novel. The album was recorded in Sheffield, São Paulo, London, and in Chicago with Steve Albini. Carroll and Albini also recorded a version of "King Creole" for New Musical Express' The Last Temptation of Elvis compilation album. Carroll subsequently moved to Chicago in late 1989. There she worked with Chicago house music producer, Vince Lawrence. Their song "Too Good To Live" was a single from the album England Made Me and the album was released in June 1991 on the Factory Records label.

American band Unrest paid tribute to Carroll in 1993, with the Cath Carroll EP released on TeenBeat records, and used a Robert Mapplethorpe portrait of Carroll on the cover of their Perfect Teeth album in the same year.

Carroll released two singles ("My Cold Heart" in 1994 and "Bad Star" in 1995) and her second album, True Crime Motel, on Teenbeat Records in 1995. In 1996 she married musician and audio engineer Kerry Kelekovich, with whom she released her eponymously titled third album in 2000, on Carroll and Kelekovich's own Lilypad label. In November 2002, Carroll released her fourth album, The Gondoliers of Ghost Lake on LTM. In 2003, LTM also released When It All Comes Down by Miaow, which compiled all of Factory's Miaow catalogue, rarities, Peel Sessions for the BBC and tracks which were never released.

In 2001, Carroll's critical discography detailing the works of Tom Waits for Unanimous Publishing's "Kill Your Idol" series was published. Three years later, the book written for Chicago Review Press examining Fleetwood Mac's Rumours was published entitled, Never Break the Chain (2004).

In 2008, Carroll continued to write musically related content for the likes of the UK music magazine, The Word, and Kevin Cummins's picture book on Joy Division, Juvenes, while also releasing the debut album from the Morris, Illinois duo, worldwideriot, on which she appeared on the song, "Lori".

In 2009, Carroll hosted the music podcast, "The Pad", re-releasing "When It All Comes Down" and "Moves Like You" which are included on Rhino/WEA box set, Factory Records: Communications 1978–92 and her latest single, "Desiree Won't Come Down" (Lilypad 2009) released on 22 April that year.

In 2010, Trembling Blue Stars, called upon Carroll to sing, "The Imperfection of Memory" appearing on their Fast Trains and Telegraph Wires album released on Elefant Records. The single, "It All Looks Good On You" was released on 16 February 2010 by Lilypad Records, who also reissued her eponymous 2000 album (retitled Glommer) and the never-was Factory Records album, Priceless Innuendo.

In 2014 Cath Carroll appeared on the album Cornish Pop Songs by The Hit Parade, singing on the three songs "Zennor Mermaid", "Wonderful View”, and "Rainy Day in Newlyn".

== Discography ==
=== With Miaow ===
==== Singles ====
- "Belle Vue" b/w "Fate", "Grocer's Devil Daughter" (1985), Venus
- "When It All Comes Down" b/w "Did She", and on the 12": "When It All Comes Down (cotechism mix)" (1987), Factory FAC179
- "Break the Code" b/w "Stolen Cars" (1987), Factory FAC189

==== Albums ====
- When It All Comes Down (2003), LTM – compilation

==== Compilation appearances ====
- C86 (1986) includes "Sport Most Royal"
- Palatine – The Beat Groups (1991), factory – includes "When It All Comes Down"
- Factory Records: Communications 1978–92 (2009), Rhino – includes "When It All Comes Down"

=== Cath Carroll ===
==== Albums ====
- England Made Me (1991), Factory
- True Crime Motel (1995), TeenBeat/Matador
- Cath Carroll (2000), Heart and Soul
- The Gondoliers Of Ghost Lake (2002), LTM

==== Singles ====
- "Beast on the Streets" (1990), Factory
- "Moves Like You" (1991), Factory
- "My Cold Heart" b/w "Into Day" (1994), TeenBeat
- "Bad Star" b/w "Mississippi River Factory Town" (1995), TeenBeat
- "Free" (2001), Lilypad – promotional-only single
- "True Crime Motel 2001" (2001),
- "The Gravity Within" (2007), All Over The Place
- "Snobears" (2008), Lilypad
- "Desiree Won't Come Down" (2009), Lilypad

==== Compilation appearances ====
- The Last Temptation of Elvis (1990), NME includes "King Creole" (w/Steve Albini)
- SELECT FAC305C – The Factory Tape (1991) Factory / Select UK magazine includes "Moves Like You" & "Next Time (Edit)"
- Palatine – Selling Out (1991), Factory includes "Moves Like You (remix)"
- The Factory Story, Part One (1997), London includes "Moves Like You (remix)"
- Forever Dusty (2000), R & D – includes "No Easy Way Down"
- Black Music (2003), LTM – includes "True Crime Motel remix"
- Edge of Time (2004), Fairbanks – includes "I Remember The Sun"
- Factory Records: Communications 1978–92 (2009), Rhino – includes "Moves Like You"

==== Contributing vocals ====
- The Hit Parade – The Sound Of The Hit Parade (1993), Polystar
- The Hit Parade – "Autobiography" (1994), Sarah
- Nomad Planets – The Indestructible Drop (1998), Fairbanks – backing vocals on "Dance" and "Wink & A Prayer"
- Trembling Blue Stars – Fast Trains and Telegraph Wires – vocals on "The Imperfections of Memory", 2010, Elefant Records
- The Hit Parade – Cornish Pop Songs (2014), JSH Records
