= Isabel Bishop =

American painter and graphic artist (1902–1988)

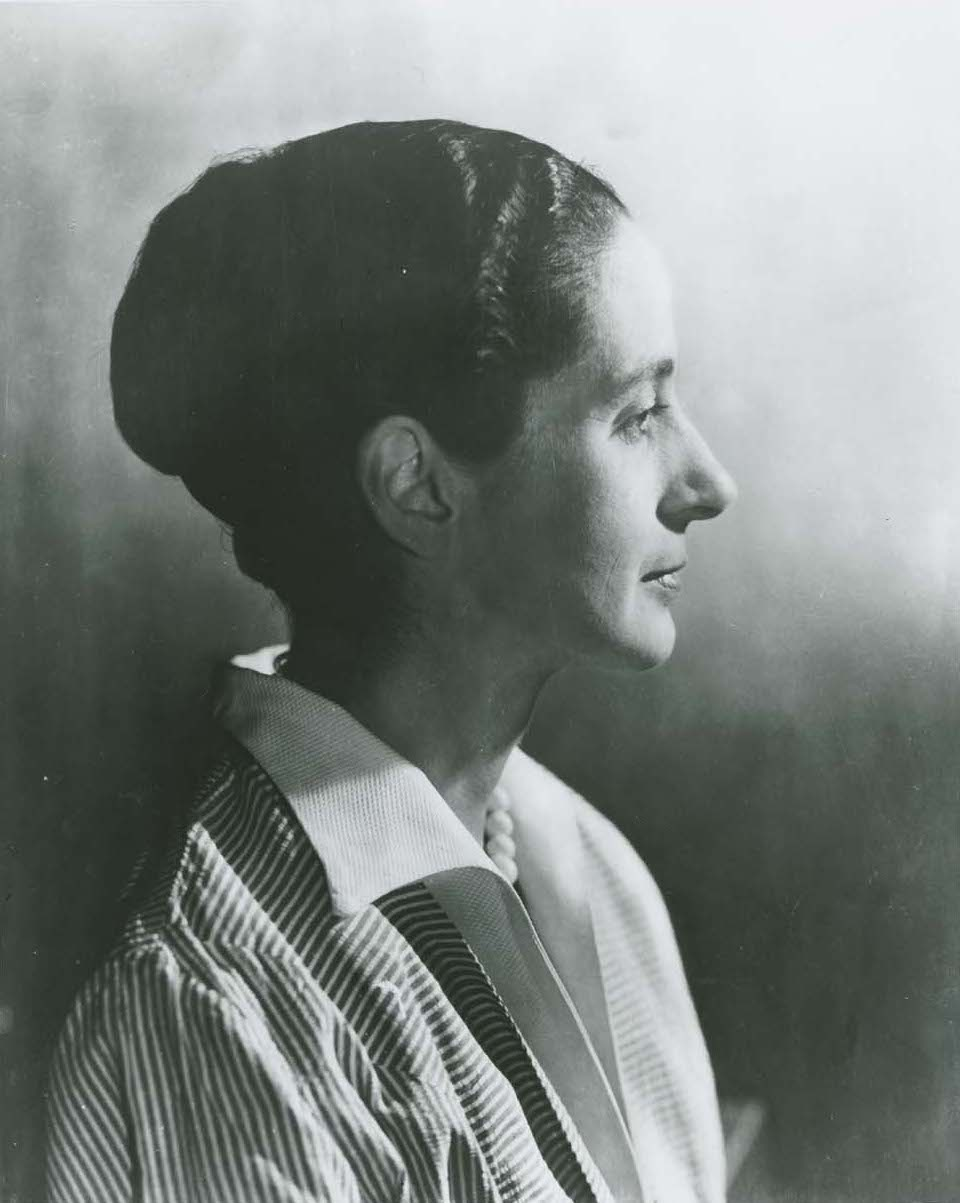
- Born: March 3, 1902; Cincinnati, Ohio, United States
- Died: February 19, 1988 (aged 85)
- Education: New York School of Applied Design for Women
- Known for: Painting, graphic design

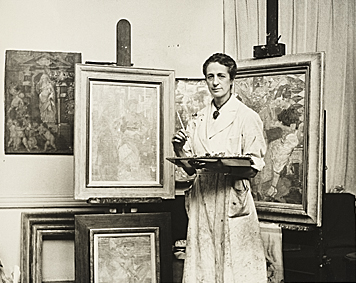
Isabel Bishop in her studio

Isabel Bishop (March 3, 1902 – February 19, 1988) was an American painter and graphic artist. Bishop studied under Kenneth Hayes Miller at the Art Students League of New York, where she would later become an instructor. She was most notable for her scenes of everyday life in Manhattan, as a member of the loosely defined ‘Fourteenth Street School’ of artists, grouped in that precinct. Union Square features prominently in her work, which mainly depicts female figures. Bishop’s paintings won the American Academy of Arts and Letters Award, among other distinctions.

== Early life and education ==
Bishop was born the youngest of five siblings in Cincinnati, Ohio. Founders of a prep school in Princeton, New Jersey, her parents were highly educated individuals and descendants from East coast mercantile families. Though the family descended from old wealth, their immediate status was of the middle class, and financial insecurity forced the family to move often. Bishop spent her childhood years in Detroit, Michigan. In every new city the Bishop family would move to, John, Isabel's father, would become involved with a local school. Oftentimes becoming the principal or eventually owning the school. Bishop compared growing up and moving around with her parents to be like being an only child, because her siblings were fifteen plus years older than her and didn't live with her family at the time.

Her father was a scholar of Greek and Latin. Her siblings, two sets of twins, were older than her by well over a decade. One set of twins, a boy and a girl, were twelve years older; the other set of twins, also a boy and girl, were fifteen years old at the time of her birth. Her mother was emotionally indifferent and distant from Bishop; she was a suffragist, feminist and aspiring writer who urged her daughters to become independent, strong women. After the family relocated to Detroit, Bishop began her art education at the age of 12 in a Saturday morning life drawing class at the John Wicker Art School in Detroit.

In 1918, at the age of 15, Bishop graduated high school and began art studies at John Wicker's art school in Detroit, Michigan. She later moved to New York City to study illustration at the New York School of Applied Design for Women. After two years there she shifted from illustration to painting, and attended the Art Students League for four years until 1924. It was there that she studied with Guy Pène du Bois and with Kenneth Hayes Miller, from whom she adapted a technique which owed much to baroque Flemish painting. In addition, she learned from other early modernists including Max Weber and Robert Henri. During the early 1920s she also studied and painted in Woodstock, New York. In 1963, she went to Yale University School of Fine Arts, New Haven.

Bishop was described as an eager intellectual who was naturally inquisitive and independent in her ways. In this period, women were becoming very active in the arts community, yet were still taken for granted. Bishop pushed against this attitude toward women artists with her insistence on applying herself both academically and politically in the art realm. Throughout her educational ventures, she was fully funded by her father's cousin, James Bishop Ford, who aided her family in their time of need. Writing on this financial sponsorship, Isabel Bishop states that she viewed her gender as an advantage: "I was lucky. I think if I had been a man the relative who sponsored my whole studenthood might not have done so. Men are supposed to make their own way. Young women were supposed to marry. But a young woman putting so much time and effort—being so serious—that was different—that interested him. I don't think he would have subsidized me if I had been a boy."

== Career ==
For the first time that she taught at The Art Students League in New York, she was the only full time woman teacher in that school.

Throughout the 1920s and 1930s she developed a realist style of painting, primarily depicting women in their daily routine on the streets of Manhattan. Her work was greatly influenced by Peter Paul Rubens and other Dutch and Flemish painters that she had discovered during trips to Europe. In 1932, Bishop began showing her work frequently at the newly opened Midtown Galleries, where her work would be represented throughout her career. Bishop takes inspiration from Rubens by adding a light ochre-ish tone to all her works, allowing for the painting to be rendered in any way.

In 1934, Bishop married Dr. Harold G. Wolff, a neurologist, and moved to Riverdale New York. However, she continued to work in a loft studio near Union Square at 9 West Fourteenth St, which she continued to use until 1984. She became interested in the interaction of form and ground and the mobility of everyday life, what she called "unfixity", life and movement captured on canvas. Her style is noted for its sensitive modeling of form and "a submarine pearliness and density of atmosphere". During this time, Bishop began working in various printing techniques, most notably aquatint.

Her work was included in the first three iterations of the Whitney Biennial in 1932, 1934, and 1936, as well as ten subsequent annual exhibitions at the Whitney Museum of American Art. She returned to the Art Students League as an instructor from 1936 to 1937. In 1940, Bishop was elected into the National Academy of Design as an associate member, and became a full member in 1941. Her work was also part of the painting event in the art competition at the 1932 Summer Olympics. She was also a member of and frequently shown her work in the Society of American Graphic Artists exhibitions.

In 1938, she painted a post office mural, Great Men Came from the Hills, in New Lexington, Ohio, through the Section of Painting and Sculpture. According to the Ohio Historical Society, “In Isabel Bishop’s mural for New Lexington, historic personages from the town admire their achievements across the valley, where we see the forms and silhouettes of distant buildings. The artist, from New York City, discovered that the townspeople were proud of the distinguished people who came from Perry County. She included a Revolutionary soldier, a governor of Wisconsin, a founder of New Lexington and his grandson, an author of reference books on Ohio, the developer of the coal industry, a senator, a newspaperman, a naturalist, the county’s first historian, and General Sheridan.”

Bishop's mature works mainly depict the inhabitants of New York's Union Square area. Her portraits are often studies of individual heads (see Laughing Head, 1938, Butler Institute of American Art); the emphasis securely on the subject's expression – or of solitary nudes. Bishop also painted multiple-figure compositions, often containing two females engaged in various workday interactions. In the post-war years, Bishop's interest turned to more abstracted scenes of New Yorkers walking and traveling, in the streets or on the subways. Her signature changed many times over her career, ranging from the use of various pseudonyms to initials; some early pieces are signed I.B, or I. Bishop in both block and script. Her work remains significant as an example of the thematic concerns of the Fourteenth St. School, as well as her contribution to feminism and the "new woman" emerging in urban landscapes. The "Fourteenth Street School," was a loosely affiliated group named for the area around Union Square, where Bishop, Reginald Marsh, and the brothers Raphael Soyer and Moses Soyer worked. In 1946 Bishop became an officer of the National Institute of Arts and Letters, she was the first woman to hold this position.

In the mid-1940s, E. P. Dutton commissioned Bishop to illustrate a new edition of Jane Austen's novel Pride and Prejudice. Bishop produced 31 pen-and-ink drawings (the originals are now at the Pierpont Morgan Library).

The first retrospective exhibition of Bishop's work was held during her lifetime at the University of Arizona Museum of Art in 1974.

== Awards ==
In 1943, Bishop was awarded the American Academy of Arts and Letters Award.

In 1979, President Jimmy Carter presented her with the Outstanding Achievement in the Arts Award.

In 1987, she received a Gold Medal for Painting by the American Academy of Arts and Letters.

== Notable works ==
Virgil and Dante in Union Square, 1932, Oil on canvas, Delaware Art Museum

This piece hung in Bishop's Riverdale home for more than seven years, and set the leitmotif of her career. As a child, Bishop became familiar with the story of Virgil and Dante through her mother, who was translating the text from Italian. Dante's journey through heaven and hell represented the extraordinary depth to life and its many experiences. The two figures standing in front of Union Square adds a narrative element to the bustling scene of life in a city of millions, and sets the scene for her various paintings and prints of urban life.

Two Girls, 1935, Oil and tempera on Masonite, Metropolitan Museum of Art

One of Bishop's most well-known works, the painting took more than a year to complete and was shown at the Midtown Galleries. For the piece, Bishop had two acquaintances from the Union Square area pose, wanting to capture the interaction of the two figures. The piece was painted with oil and tempera.

Encounter, 1940, Oil and tempera on Masonite, St Louis Art Museum

In Encounter, Bishop continues with her multiple-figure compositions capturing a scene of interaction between a man and a woman on a city street. Her depiction of the woman as forthright and confident, approaching the man and backing him against a wall, exemplifies Bishop's understanding of shifting gender roles at the time.

Tidying Up, 1941, Oil on Masonite, Indianapolis Museum of Art

Tidying Up depicts a young female office worker in the midst of checking her teeth in a compact mirror. The ungainly image of self-inspection accords with Bishop's realism and her interest in the daily lives of working women. The rough brushstrokes and surface texture exhibit an interest in old master paintings.

== Exhibitions ==
- Drawings and Etchings by Isabel Bishop, March 7–23, 1935, Midtown Galleries, New York.
- Paintings by Isabel Bishop, February 11–February 29, 1936, Midtown Galleries, New York.
- Paintings and drawings by Isabel Bishop, January 17–February 4, 1939, Midtown Galleries, New York.
- Drawings by Isabel Bishop, May 18–June 6, 1942, Midtown Galleries, New York.
- Paintings by Isabel Bishop, February 2–March 1, 1947, Midtown Galleries, New York.
- Paintings by Isabel Bishop, May 3–May 21, 1949, Midtown Galleries, New York.
- Paintings and Drawings by Isabel Bishop, October 25–November 19, 1955, Midtown Galleries, New York.
- Paintings by Isabel Bishop, March 7–March 30, 1960, Midtown Galleries, New York.
- Paintings by Isabel Bishop, May 3–May 28, 1960, Midtown Galleries, New York.
- Paintings by Isabel Bishop, April 4–29, 1967, Midtown Galleries, New York.
- Paintings by Isabel Bishop. Sculpture by Dorothea Greenbaum. [Exhibition], May 2–July 5, 1970, New Jersey State Museum, Trenton, New Jersey.
- Isabel Bishop: A Selection of Drawings and Prints, January 8–February 2, 1974, Midtown Galleries, New York.
- Isabel Bishop, 1974, University of Arizona Museum of Art, Tucson, Arizona.
- The Lydia and Warren Chappell Collection of Drawings and Prints by Isabel Bishop, April 12–May 18, 1975, University of Virginia Art Museum, Charlottesville, Virginia.
- Illustrations by Isabel Bishop for "Pride and Prejudice" by Jane Austen, November 2–20, 1976, Midtown Galleries, New York.
- Drawings and Etchings by Isabel Bishop, December 5–30, 1978, Midtown Galleries, New York.
- Isabel Bishop Exhibition—A Fifty Year Drawing Retrospective and Recent Paintings, October 6–31, 1981, Midtown Galleries, New York.
- Isabel Bishop, An Intimate Exhibition of Work of the Past Five Years, February 1–26, 1983, Midtown Galleries, New York.
- Isabel Bishop: Drawings - Paintings, January 8–February 2, 1985, Midtown Galleries, New York.
- Isabel Bishop: Across Five Decades - The Affectionate Eye, March, 1985, Laband Art Gallery, Loyola Marymount University, Los Angeles, California.
- Isabel Bishop: Etchings and Aquatints, 1985.
- Isabel Bishop: A Retrospective of Prints and Drawings. November 5–26, 1985, Associated American Artists, New York.
- Three Figurative Artists: Paul Cadmus, Isabel Bishop, Bernarda Bryson Shahn, December 10, 1985–January 8, 1986, Midtown Galleries, New York.
- Isabel Bishop: Early Drawings, December 9, 1986–January 17, 1987, Midtown Galleries, New York.
- Isabel Bishop, July 24–September 9, 1990, National Museum of Women in the Arts, Washington, D.C.
- Isabel Bishop, May 16–30, 1991, Louis Newman Galleries, Beverly Hills, California.
- Isabel Bishop: Walking Pictures, October 13–November 14, 1992, Midtown Payson Galleries, New York.
- Isabel Bishop: Drawings, April 7–May 2, 1998, DC Moore Gallery, New York.
- Miracle of Movement: Isabel Bishop in Union Square, New York, March 6–May 17, 2009, National Museum of Women in the Arts, Washington, D.C.
- Isabel Bishop, 1902–1988: A Selection of Paintings, Drawings, and Prints, September 5–October 5, 2013, DC Moore Gallery, New York.
- Women's Work: Selections from the Sordoni Art Gallery Permanent Collection. June 5–July 27, 2014, Sordoni Art Gallery, Wilkes University, Wilkes-Barre, Pennsylvania.

== Bibliography ==
=== Books ===
- Brooklyn Museum. Isabel Bishop--Prints and Drawings, 1925–1964. Brooklyn: The Museum, 1964.
- Ellett, Mary Sweeney. “Isabel Bishop—The Endless Search.” Ph.D diss. University of Virginia, 1987.
- Lunde, Karl. Isabel Bishop. New York: Abrams, 1975.
- Nemser, Cindy. Art Talk: Conversations with 15 Women Artists. New York: IconEditions, 1995. Pages 303–320.
- Teller, Susan. Isabel Bishop—Etchings and Aquatints: a catalogue raisonné. 2nd ed. New York: Associated American Artists, 1985.
- Todd, Ellen Wiley. The "New Woman" Revised: Painting and Gender Politics on Fourteenth Street. Berkeley: University of California Press, 1993. Chapter 7, pages 55–62.
- Yglesias, Helen. Isabel Bishop. New York: Rizzoli, 1989.

=== Articles ===
- Ellett, Mary S. “Isabel Bishop: The Endless Search.” Southeastern College Art Conference Review 11, no. 2 (Spring 1987): 165–166.
- Rubinstein, Charlotte Streifer, "American Scene and Realist Painting: Isabel Bishop." American Women Artists: From Early Indian Times to the Present. Boston: G.K. Jall & Co., 1982
- Todd, Ellen Wiley. “Isabel Bishop—Our Modern Master?” Woman's Art Journal 13 (Spring/Summer 1992): 45–47.
- Wooden, Howard. "Art Feature: Isabel Bishop's Self-Portrait. Wichita Art Museum News (April 1988).
- Yglesias, Helen. “Isabel Bishop: Paintings, Drawings, Prints.” Massachusetts Review 24 (Summer 1983): 289–304.

== See also ==
- Young Woman

== Notes ==
- The Isabel Bishop Papers, 1914-1983 have been digitized and posted online by the Archives of American Art, Smithsonian Institution. These primary source historical documents include biographical documents, correspondence, writings and notes, exhibition catalogs, photographs of Bishop with her husband and in her studio, original artwork including 8 sketchbooks, loose sketches, prints, and watercolor figure studies.
- The American indie rock band Unrest released an EP named the Isabel Bishop E.P. in 1993, with Bishop's picture on the cover. It includes the song "Isabel", originally on the album Imperial f.f.r.r., which references Detroit and Bishop's painting "Five Women Walking".
- One of Bishop's illustrations for Pride and Prejudice—of Elizabeth Bennet reading a letter from Jane—will be prominently featured on the £10 note honoring Jane Austen. The note will be in circulation in 2016.
