= Eugenie Schein =

- Born: May 3, 1905; Austria
- Died: April 15, 2003 (aged 97); Vero Beach, FL
- Known for: Watercolors of dancers

Eugenie Schein (May 3, 1905-April 15, 2003) was an American artist and dancer who immigrated from Austria in 1913. She was known for her abstract paintings of dancers from around the world and often found her subjects during her travels with the Martha Graham Dance Company. She trained under the head of the modern dance movement, Martha Graham. In the 1930s, her art was displayed at the Midtown Galleries and the Uptown Gallery in New York City, and later in Hamburgo, Mexico, Havana, Cuba, Puerto Rico, and the Miami Beach Art Center in Florida.

== Early life and education ==
Eugenie emigrated through Ellis Island from Austria with her father, Adolph, mother, Frieda, and four siblings Bertha, Selma, Fred and Emmanuel. Her family was Jewish, and in 1945 she joined 1700 other professors in signing a petition supporting a Jewish national home in Palestine. She received her Bachelors of Art Degree in Fine Arts at Hunter College in New York, where she later became an instructor in physical education and modern dance. She received her Masters Degree in Fine Art at Columbia University in New York City. She also studied painting and sculpture at the Art Students League and at the University of New Mexico's Field School in 1940. Her preferred media consisted of oils, acrylics, and watercolors. A catalog was issued of her monotypes by the Miami Museum of Modern Art.

She traveled to Havana, Cuba, in 1932, to England, Scotland and Italy by 1936, to Mexico by 1937, and Ciudad Trujillo, Dominican Republic, in 1938.

== Career ==
Schein was one of 83 sponsors of the first National Dance Congress and festival that took place May 18, 1936, in New York City in the Theresa L. Kaufmann Theatre at Lexington Avenue and 92nd Street. She was a founding member of the Dance Teachers Advisory Committee in New York. In 1936, her pictures were exhibited in San Francisco as part of the Mrs. Beatrice Laufman collection, along with Isabel Bishop, Paul Cadmus, Marsden Hartley, Kenneth Hayes Miller, and Betty B. Parsons.

She left New York in 1954, not long after testifying in hearings against three faculty suspected of Communist Party Membership at Hunter College. She moved to Miami, where her brothers Emmanuel and Fred owned the Bombay Hotel in Miami Beach. She was a Physical Education and dance instructor at the University of Miami and the Greater Miami Jewish Community Center. She continued to exhibit her paintings in later life, primarily in galleries in Miami, Florida. She was a member of the National Association of Women Artists and the local chapter president of the National Artists Equity Association in 1964. She died in Florida in 2003.
