= Twister (album) =

Compilation album by Unrest
- Released: September 9, 1988
- Recorded: 1983 – 1988
- Genre: Indie rock
- Length: 63:00
- Label: TeenBeat

Unrest chronology
| Tink of S.E. (1987) | Twister (1988) | Malcolm X Park (1988) |

Professional ratings
Review scores
| Source | Rating |
|---|---|
| Allmusic | 3/5 stars |

Twister is a compilation album by Washington, D.C. Indie band Unrest, released on September 9, 1988, by TeenBeat Records.

== Track listing ==
All tracks are written by Unrest.

Side one
| No. | Title | Length |
|---|---|---|
| 1. | "Disco Majick" | 3:05 |
| 2. | "Woody Allen" | 1:21 |
| 3. | "Green" | 2:25 |
| 4. | "Communist Tart" | 2:41 |
| 5. | "Velvet Spit" | 5:25 |
| 6. | "Give Me Yr Eyes" | 2:42 |
| 7. | "OK" | 1:14 |
| 8. | "Breathe In" | 2:37 |
| 9. | "Dago Rising" | 1:43 |
| 10. | "Man Hole Burn" | 2:07 |
| 11. | "Obliteration" | 2:33 |
| 12. | "Gustave" | 2:21 |
| 13. | "[untitled]" | 1:15 |

Side two
| No. | Title | Length |
|---|---|---|
| 1. | "Sweet Wakefield" | 1:28 |
| 2. | "Solid State" | 2:29 |
| 3. | "Oily" | 2:47 |
| 4. | "Ragged (nkd t)" | 1:06 |
| 5. | "I Hate Ms Toivanen/Wshingtn" | 2:36 |
| 6. | "Midnight for Two" | 5:11 |
| 7. | "Headringer" | 2:33 |
| 8. | "Twist 66" | 2:11 |
| 9. | "Neal We Love You" | 3:43 |
| 10. | "Fuck You G.I." | 1:23 |
| 11. | "Scorpio Rising" | 2:59 |
| 12. | "Teen Bt" | 2:01 |
| 13. | "[untitled]" | 1:07 |

== Personnel ==
Adapted from the Twister liner notes.

Unrest

- Phil Krauth – instruments
- Tim Moran – instruments
- Dave Park – instruments
- Mark Robinson – instruments, design
- Chris Thomson – instruments

Production and additional personnel

- Unrest – recording

== Release history ==
| Region | Date | Label | Format | Catalog |
|---|---|---|---|---|
| United States | 1988 | TeenBeat | CS | TEENBEAT 23 |
| United States | 2009 | TeenBeat | CD | TEENBEAT 23 |
