= Perfect Teeth =

Studio album by Unrest
- Released: August 9, 1993
- Recorded: March 1993
- Studio: Pachyderm (Cannon Falls, Minnesota)
- Length: 43:52
- Label: 4AD

Unrest chronology
Isabel Bishop (1993)	Perfect Teeth (1993)	Cath Carroll (1993)

Perfect Teeth is the seventh and final studio album by the Washington, D.C., indie band Unrest, released on August 9, 1993, by 4AD. The album was recorded at Pachyderm Studios. Unrest initially joked with their management about having Simon Le Bon of Duran Duran to produce the album, which led to him coming into the studio, but not being involved with production.

Perfect Teeth was Unrest's highest selling album and was initially released as a box set of 7" vinyl records before being released in other formats such as compact disc and cassette. The album received positive reviews from Select, Spin and the Chicago Tribune but was dismissed by Entertainment Weekly which found that the music lacked depth. Retrospective reviews in AllMusic referred to the album as Unrest's peak while Spin echoed Entertainment Weekly's opinion.

== Production ==
Perfect Teeth was recorded at Pachyderm Studios in Minneapolis in five days. Simon Le Bon is credited as the producer of Perfect Teeth. Robinson said that they initially joked about getting him to produce the album, but then the label contacted him which led to Le Bon coming into the studio for two days, but he did not produce the album in any form.

== Release ==
Perfect Teeth was released on August 9, 1993, as a box set of 7" vinyl records. It was later released on compact disc, 12" vinyl and cassette on August 24, 1993. In 2010, Billboard stated that the group's albums "never managed to sell big" and that Perfect Teeth was their best selling album which sold about 15,000 copies according to Nielsen SoundScan. Following the release of Perfect Teeth, Unrest embarked on a tour where they opened for Stereolab.

Perfect Teeth was re-issued by Teen Beat Records in 2012. The reissue was similar to the original vinyl release of the album as it was issued in a 7" vinyl box set with six colored records and six additional non-album tracks. It also included a 24-page booklet photographs taken by Mark Robinson during the recording of Perfect Teeth.

== Reception ==
Professional ratings
Review scores
Source	Rating
AllMusic	4.5/5 stars
Chicago Tribune	3/4 stars
Entertainment Weekly	C−
Pitchfork	8.4/10
Select	(4/5)
Spin Alternative Record Guide	6/10

From a contemporary review, Erik Davis (Spin) praised the songwriting and opined the group could not "resist drawing out the pretty parts of its songs" Select noted the album's "great songs that were hinted at on last year's overrated Imperial ffrr" and while disliking a track described as "a token wine-glass drone type track", it was "soon forgotten in the midst of such potent, fully realised music." The Chicago Tribune noted that Unrest "employs guitars that jangle engagingly and fresh voices that recall a more innocent age, intoxicated by possibility" and that "there's an undercurrent of melancholy to "Perfect Teeth" that makes these deceptively modest tunes resonate." Chuck Eddy (Entertainment Weekly) spoke negatively about the album, finding that the guitar playing "so lethargic it’s almost not there" and that the album only contained "some vaguely pretty moments", specifically on the song "Make Out Club".

From retrospective reviews, Heather Phares (AllMusic) gave the album four and a half stars out of five, finding that the group's tendencies of both pop and experimental music "come together with terrific success on Perfect Teeth" and declared it the high point of the group's career. The Spin Alternative Record Guide described the album as "edgy but restful" but found the songs did not take time to assert themselves, noting that Robinsons' songs "had become a series of pretty cloud-puffs. They went poof too soon if you thought about them too much."

== Track listing ==
All lyrics are written by Mark Robinson, except "Light Command" and "Stylized Ampersand" by Bridget Cross and "West Coast Love Affair" by Phil Krauth; all music is composed by Unrest.

No.	Title	Length
1.	"Angel I'll Walk You Home"	3:21
2.	"Cath Carroll"	3:15
3.	"So Sick"	3:06
4.	"Light Command"	4:14
5.	"Food & Drink Synthesizer"	1:56
6.	"Soon It Is Going to Rain"	6:30
7.	"Make Out Club"	4:19
8.	"Breather X.O.X.O."	5:49
9.	"West Coast Love Affair"	4:07
10.	"Six Layer Cake"	3:32
11.	"Stylized Ampersand"	3:43

== Personnel ==
Adapted from the Perfect Teeth liner notes.

Unrest

- Bridget Cross – bass guitar, lead vocals (1, 4, 11), backing vocals (8), guitar (11)
- Phil Krauth – drums, piano, guitar, lead vocals (9)
- Mark Robinson – lead vocals, guitar

Production and additional personnel

- Brian Paulson – engineering, recording, mixing
- Brent Sigmeth – assistant recording
- Unrest – mixing

== Release history ==
Region	Date	Label	Format	Catalog
United Kingdom	1993	4AD	CD, CS, LP	CAD 3012
