= Pork markets =

Pork markets may refer to:

- Meat markets that sell pork
- Livestock market for pigs
- Pork futures, a futures contract on pork that is used as a commodities derivative traded on financial markets
  - Lean Hog, a type of pork futures
  - Pork belly futures
- A reference to British Environment Secretary Liz Truss and her attempts to open up the Chinese marketplace in 2015

== See also ==
- Pork (disambiguation)
- Market (disambiguation)
