= Unrest (Unrest album) =

Studio album by Unrest
- Released: May 1, 1985
- Recorded: Tim's House and Abingdon Obervatory, Arlington, VA
- Genre: Indie rock
- Length: 32:17
- Label: TeenBeat
- Producer: Phil Krauth, Mark Robinson

Unrest chronology
Unrest (1985)	Lisa Carol Freemont (1985)

Professional ratings
Review scores
Source	Rating
Allmusic	2/5 stars

Unrest is the eponymously titled debut studio album of Washington, D.C. Indie band Unrest, released on May 1, 1985 by TeenBeat Records.

== Track listing ==
All tracks are written by Unrest, except where noted.

Side one
No.	Title	Writer(s)	Length
1.	"So You Want to Be a Rock 'n' Roll Star" (The Byrds cover)	Chris Hillman, Jim McGuinn	2:56
2.	"Judy Says, Part I (Ode to J.)"		3:46
3.	"Scott & Zelda"		2:59
4.	"Holiday in Berlin, Part I"		2:14
5.	"Straight Edge" (Minor Threat cover)	Ian MacKaye	2:29
6.	"Manhattan"	George Gershwin	1:47

Side two
No.	Title	Writer(s)	Length
1.	"Judy Says, Part II"		5:14
2.	"The Hilltop, part two"	Mark Robinson	1:14
3.	"Enola Gay"		1:46
4.	"A Picnic at Hanging Rock (The Hilltop, Part 3)"		4:48
5.	"Woody Allen"		1:02
6.	"Cats"		2:02

== Personnel ==
Adapted from the Unrest liner notes.

Unrest

- Phil Krauth – drums, tambourine, voice (A6), production
- Tim Moran – bass guitar, guitar (A5, B4), voice (B6)
- Mark Robinson – lead vocals, guitar, piano, bass guitar (A5, B2, B4), production

== Release history ==
Region	Date	Label	Format	Catalog
United States	1985	TeenBeat	CS	TEENBEAT 2
United States	2009	TeenBeat	CD	TEENBEAT 2
