= England Made Me (Cath Carroll album) =

Studio album by Cath Carroll
- Released: 1991
- Length: 54:14; 73:48 (2002 reissue)
- Label: Factory

Cath Carroll chronology
England Made Me (1991)	True Crime Motel (1995)

England Made Me is the debut studio album by British singer and musician Cath Carroll, released by Factory in 1991. The album was reissued by LTM in 2002 with a rearranged track order and four bonus tracks.

Two singles were released from the album: "Beast" in 1990 and "Moves Like You" in 1991.

== Background ==
In 1988, Carroll signed to Factory Records as a solo artist and began working on her debut album, England Made Me, which was named after the 1935 novel by Graham Greene. The album was recorded at Fon Studios in Sheffield, Cardan Studios in São Paulo, Blackwing Studios in London and at the Chicago Recording Company.

Carroll was inspired to give some of the songs a Latin influence after she was introduced to Batucada music and saw the London School of Samba. She told New Musical Express in 1990, "I wanted to do something with those rhythms because I listen to them a lot. There is a danger of falling into being a cheap version of David Byrne or Paul Simon but I don't think that really affects me. It's just that I feel Batucada is very similar to rockabilly and cajun, which are musics that I like."

The album's title track was inspired by Carroll's disillusionment with England, including Thatcherism as well as everyday problems such as the crowded conditions and regular cancellation of trains on the London Underground. She decided to move to Chicago in 1989. She told New Musical Express that the song is about "urban decay" and described it as "kind of my Billy Bragg number". "Train You're On" was the result of a recording session with Steve Albini in Chicago. The sessions also produced a version of "King Creole" which was released on the 1990 NME Elvis Presley tribute album The Last Temptation of Elvis.

== Critical reception ==
Professional ratings
Review scores
Source	Rating
AllMusic	3/5 stars
New Musical Express	8/10
Select	3/5 stars
Stafford Post	2/5 stars

On its release, Dele Fadele of New Musical Express praised England Made Me as "both a coffee-table artefact – all smooth, lush aural landscapes – and a collection of observations, heartfelt pleas and abstracts from someone rather disillusioned with her homeland". She added there are "only two failings: the absence of Cath's trademark guitar and that even more Brazilian input (i.e. louder levels) wouldn't have gone amiss". Ian Gittins of Melody Maker described it as "truly ravishing" and a "sparkling, unlikely success". He commented, "Texturally, England Made Me throbs with scarlet electro and lazy Latin-jazz shuffles. Cleverly, Cath nicks from her various adopted cultures (especially South American) precisely what suits her guarded, heat-guided words of regret and curiosity. These song-stories of heat and dust really sting." Johnny Black of Hi-Fi News & Record Review noted the album's "terrifyingly sinister tales sung in deadpan tones" and "musical atmospheres which are not only mesmerically beautiful but also startlingly original".

Adam Sweeting of The Guardian described the album as "a collection of limpid but atmospheric songs, coolly sung and sparingly played". He concluded, "This record steals over you like a fit of melancholia, and beware – it's more potent than it seems." Neil Spencer of The Observer felt that Carroll "promises much" on the album and noted how it is "heavy on languid atmosphere", but felt the songs "prove disappointingly slight" and added that the "clever productions can't always conceal her Sade-style vocal limitations". Chris Evans of the Stafford Post noted it as "one of the most curious debuts by a Manchester lass, not least because its roots are less in Lancashire than South America". However, he felt Carroll's voice was "of the languid-going-on-anaemic school best epitomised by Sade" and added that the material was "melodically slender and lyrically cack-handed". He concluded, "It aims for slinky and atmospheric and achieves only dull posturing."

In a retrospective review, J. Edward Keyes of AllMusic noted the album is "bloated with unremarkable songs" but felt it was still "a consistently engaging affair, a cunning work of slinky, sinister pop and ghostly electronics". He praised Carroll's "aching alto" and how she "ably applies both her wordsmithery and melodic knack throughout the album". He felt that the "moody and spare" songs such as "Beast on the Street" and "Watching You" were better than those which "abandon [the] moodiness", commenting that on those tracks the "results are nearly always disastrous". He also noted the album is "noteworthy for the way it prefigured the sort of female-fronted dance pop popularized by groups like Saint Etienne and Waltz for Debbie".

== Track listing ==
All tracks are written by Cath Carroll and Sim Lister.

No.	Title	Length
1.	"To Close Your Eyes Forever"	5:53
2.	"Unforgettable"	3:53
3.	"Moves Like You"	6:34
4.	"Watching You"	6:27
5.	"Beast on the Streets"	6:57
6.	"Subtitled"	6:36
7.	"Next Time (He's Mine)"	4:34
8.	"England Made Me"	4:19
9.	"Send Me Over"	4:12
10.	"Train You're On"	4:16

2002 LTM CD reissue
No.	Title	Length
1.	"Moves Like You"	6:38
2.	"Unforgettable"	3:56
3.	"Beast on the Streets"	7:00
4.	"Train You're On"	4:20
5.	"Send Me Over"	4:16
6.	"Subtitled"	6:39
7.	"Watching You"	6:30
8.	"Next Time (He's Mine)"	4:38
9.	"To Close Your Eyes Forever"	5:53
10.	"Too Good to Live"	4:44
11.	"Moves Like You" (Remix)	4:16
12.	"Send Me Over" (Remix)	3:46
13.	"Beast on the Streets" (Remix)	6:46
14.	"England Made Me"	4:21

== Personnel ==
Credits are adapted from the original 1991 CD album booklet's liner notes.

- Cath Carroll – vocals (1–10), backing vocals (1–10)
- Sim Lister – drums (1–6, 8–9), keyboard programming (1–9), saxophone (1, 5)
- Mark Brydon – drums (1, 6, 8–9), keyboard programming (1, 6, 8–9), guitar (1), woozy guitar (5)
- Antenor Soares Gandra Neto – guitar (2, 8)
- Dirceu Simones de Medeiros – drums (2, 7, 10)
- Osvaldinho da Cuica – triangle (2, 4), percussion (7, 10), cuica (8), tamborim (9)
- Silvano Michelino – congas (2, 9)
- Dave Howard – backing vocals (2)
- Colin Elliott – triangle (3), congas (6)
- Valerie A. James – backing vocals (3, 5–6)
- Vincente da Paula Silva – piano (4), percussion director (7, 10), counting (10)
- Ian Davies – guitar (6)
- Balto da Silva – percussion (7, 10)
- Fred Penteado – percussion (7, 10)
- Jorginho Cebion – percussion (7, 10)
- Jonathan Quarmby – piano (7), organ solo (10)
- Barry R. Harden – bass (7, 10)
- Alan Savage – additional drums (7)
- Sharon McKoy – backing vocals (8)
- Jacqui McKoy – backing vocals (8)
- Peter Beachill – trombone (9)
- Steve Albini – anxious chicken guitar (10)
- Santiago Durango – deep core guitar (10)
- Malcolm Connell – backing vocals (10)

Production

- John Fryer – mixing (1, 3–5, 7–10), engineer
- Mark Brydon – mixing (2, 6), engineer
- Sim Lister – engineer
- Alan Fisch – engineer
- Joao Carlos Mendonca – engineer
- Vasconcelos Neto – engineer
- Sergio Kenji Okuda – engineer
- Fabio Rigobelo – engineer
- Ana Lucia Carvalho E Silva Faria – engineer
- Eric Radcliffe – engineer
- Steve Albini – engineer

Other

- Christiane Manthan – art design and direction
- Julian Broad – photography
