= Lisa Carol Freemont =

Studio album by Unrest
- Released: August 29, 1985
- Recorded: 1984 – August 27, 1985
- Studio: In their homes, Arlington, VA; City Studio, Washington, D.C.
- Genre: Indie rock
- Length: 61:13
- Label: TeenBeat
- Producer: Mark Richard

Unrest chronology
Unrest (1985)	Lisa Carol Freemont (1985)	Tink of S.E. (1987)

Professional ratings
Review scores
Source	Rating
Allmusic	1.5/5 stars

Lisa Carol Freemont is the second studio album by Washington, D.C. Indie band Unrest, released on August 29, 1985 by TeenBeat Records.

== Track listing ==
All tracks are written by Unrest, except "The Hill" by Mark Robinson and "Sweet Home Alaska" by Ed King, Gary Rossington, Ronnie Van Zant.

Side one
No.	Title	Length
1.	"Happy Song"	3:00
2.	"The Hill"	3:46
3.	"Judy Says, Part II"	2:41
4.	"Rigormortis"	2:12
5.	"Time"	3:33
6.	"Cats"	1:46
7.	"Laughter"	2:26
8.	"Holiday in Berlin, part two"	1:57
9.	"I've Come for Your Daughters"	2:40
10.	"Teenbeat Part 65"	6:00

Side two
No.	Title	Length
1.	"Happy Birthday"	3:05
2.	"Iwo Jima"	4:31
3.	"Sweet Home Alaska" (Lynyrd Skynyrd cover)	2:08
4.	"Usually on Fridays a Hamburger"	6:15
5.	"Fly to France"	3:21
6.	"Los Desasodiego"	3:48
7.	"Real Enemy"	1:43
8.	"Four Foot High Stone Wall"	3:31
9.	"Do It Now"	0:59
10.	"Frutti Column"	1:54

== Personnel ==
Adapted from the Lisa Carol Freemont liner notes.

Unrest

- Phil Krauth – drums, tambourine, bass guitar, backing vocals
- Tim Moran – bass guitar, guitar, synthesizer, drums, backing vocals
- Mark Robinson – lead vocals, guitar, piano, Casio CZ synthesizer, bass guitar, design

Additional musicians

- Tajinder Singh Chadha – backing vocals
- Suzie Longava – backing vocals
- Mike Swearingen – backing vocals
- Ian Zack – MC

Production and additional personnel

- Richard Ashman – production and engineering (A9)
- Mark Richard – production, recording

== Release history ==
Region	Date	Label	Format	Catalog
United States	1985	TeenBeat	CS	TEENBEAT 6
United States	2009	TeenBeat	CD	TEENBEAT 6
