= C. P. Lee =

British musician (1950–2020)

Christopher Paul Lee (19 January 1950 – 25 July 2020) was a British musician, author, broadcaster and lecturer from Manchester, England.

== Biography ==
Lee was born in Didsbury, south Manchester. He was a writer, broadcaster, lecturer and performer who started playing in the North West folk and beat clubs of the 1960s with his band Greasy Bear and became a linchpin of the punk rock explosion with his next band Alberto y Lost Trios Paranoias. In 1977 Lee wrote the "snuff-rock" musical Sleak, which ran for several months in London's Royal Court Theatre and the Roundhouse. It subsequently had a run at Privates in New York City in 1980. Alberto y Lost Trios Paranoias split up in 1982 after releasing three albums. Lee then wrote and performed a tribute show of routines by Lord Buckley, first in Manchester and later in other places including Amsterdam, New York and London. He also worked as a music journalist.

In 1979, Lee and John Scott released their debut album as "Gerry & the Holograms". The title track is claimed by some to have been ripped off by New Order's "Blue Monday".

When We Were Thin (published October 2007) is a personal memoir in which Lee recounts how he produced one side of the first Factory Records release, ate muffins with Andy Warhol, drove a table with Wreckless Eric and was Elvis Costello for a day.

Lee's other works included books about Bob Dylan, one of which, Like The Night (Revisited), focuses on the shout of 'Judas' aimed at Dylan at his Manchester Free Trade Hall performance in 1966, which was the climax of Martin Scorsese's documentary of Dylan, No Direction Home. Another book, Shake, Rattle & Rain, is adapted from his PhD thesis on Manchester music-making.

Lee retired after being a course leader in film studies and senior lecturer at the University of Salford, and continued writing and presenting talks, as well as documentaries for BBC Radio and TV. From 2004, he was also a co-trustee of the Manchester Digital Music Archive.

Lee died on 25 July 2020, aged 70.
