= Cath Carroll (EP) =

EP by Unrest
- Released: September 29, 1993
- Recorded: March 1993
- Studio: Pachyderm, Cannon Falls, MI
- Genre: Noise pop, krautrock
- Length: 52:57
- Label: 4AD/TeenBeat
- Producer: Brian Paulson

Unrest chronology
Perfect Teeth (1993)	Cath Carroll (1993)	B.P.M. (1991-1994) (1995)

Professional ratings
Review scores
Source	Rating
Allmusic	3/5 stars

Cath Carroll is an EP by the rock band Unrest. It was released in 1993 on 4AD.

== Track listing ==
All tracks are written by Unrest.

No.	Title	Length
1.	"Cath Carroll" (10 CC mix)	7:13
2.	"Vibe Out!"	8:51
3.	"Goodbye"	3:29
4.	"Hydro"	33:22

== Personnel ==
Adapted from the Isabel Bishop liner notes.

Unrest

- Bridget Cross – bass guitar
- Phil Krauth – drums
- Mark Robinson – vocals, guitar

Production and additional personnel

- Guy Fixsen – remixing (1)
- Brian Paulson – production

== Release history ==
Region	Date	Label	Format	Catalog
United States	1993	TeenBeat	LP	TEENBEAT 105
United Kingdom	1993	4AD	CD, LP	BAD 3015
