= Beme Seed =

US musical group

- A publicity photo of Beme Seed circa 1989.

Background information
- Origin: New York City, New York, U.S.
- Genres: Punk rock; noise rock; post-punk; psychedelic rock; experimental music; drone; Art punk
- Years active: 1988-1992
- Labels: Blast First; No. 6; Rough Trade
- Past members: Kathleen Lynch; Michael Albin; Eric Jacobs; R.S.C. Barrett; Kenny Savelson

Beme Seed was an American psychedelic noise rock band led by Kathleen Lynch, known for her collaboration with the Butthole Surfers. The band utilized guitar feedback and chanting to invoke a droning atmosphere in their music described as "panic inducing", and "supernatural". Trouser Press said of the band: "Lacking the minimal organization of even the Sun City Girls, Beme Seed captures unique psychic qualities on its three opaque and unsettling records." The demise of Beme Seed in 1992 can be seen as marking the transition from the "underground music" of the 1980s to the "alternative rock" of the early 1990s.

== Discography ==
- Beme Seed (1989, released on vinyl under the alternate title The Future Is Attacking)
- Lights Unfold (1990)
- Purify (1992)
