= City Fun =

English music fanzine

City Fun was a magazine/fanzine documenting the music scene in Manchester, England, between 1977 and 1984 and sold up to 2000 copies per issue via gigs, music stores, and selected news agents across Manchester, Liverpool, Sheffield and Leeds. The magazine was started by Andy Waide (Zero), Neil Hargreaves, Martin Heywood (X) and 'JC'. On the day it was decided to write & publish the first issue Andy Waide adopted the name Andy Zero and Martin Heywood became Martin X. The first edition was dedicated to The Distractions, and City Fun went on to document and inform the music scene in Manchester in the late 1970s and early 1980s. No one else at the time was writing about what was happening as it happened, and when others did write about Manchester music and culture it was from the outside not the inside. City Fun invited its readers to contribute articles and reviews and to tell people what was going on, or what they felt about life at the time.

City Fun went through various stages of evolution, Series 1 was anarchic and inclusive trying to include the submissions from all contributors. Series 2 was more structured and selective, Neil, Martin and JC left the 'day to day' operations and a new editorial team of Andy Zero, Cath Carroll, Liz Naylor and Bob Dickenson became the core editors. Andy Zero left in 1982 and publication/editorship was continued by Liz, Cath and latterly (vol 3 which lasted 4 issues), Nigel Chatfield. During the beginning of Volume 2, City Fun operated from an office in Lower Broughton in the building where The Fall had rehearsal rooms. Later this was produced from Liz Naylor and Cath Carroll's flat in Hulme.

Many people contributed articles including Ray Lowry (every edition of series 1 and 2), Tony Wilson, Mark E Smith, Claude Bessey, Steve Morrissey and many others.

City Fun periodically promoted benefit concerts to top up the funds needed for publication, The Distractions, Joy Division, and The Fall all performed. "Stuff The Superstars" all day festival (which include The Distractions, The Fall, Joy Division, The Hamsters, the Frantic Elevators among the dozen bands) attracted about 2000 people and a later benefit "Dr Fun's Carnival Chance" at Manchester Polytechnic (also with The Fall) featured John Peel as DJ.

The film No City Fun, by Charles Salem, was based on a City Fun article by Liz Naylor. This was used as a basis for the film Factory Flick with music by Joy Division. This super 8 film was referenced in the Joy Division film of 2010.

An online exhibition of scanned articles from City Fun was curated by Abigail Ward, Dave Haslam and David Wilkinson and appears on the Manchester District Music Archive website. The permanent exhibition includes an introduction from Haslam.
