= Tink of S.E. =

Studio album by Unrest
- Released: October 31, 1987
- Recorded: August 26, 1986
- Studio: City Studio, Washington, D.C.
- Length: 44:35
- Label: TeenBeat
- Producer: Richard Ashman, Eli Janney, Paul Kearny, Phil Krauth, Mark Robinson

Unrest chronology
Lisa Carol Freemont (1985)	Tink of S.E. (1987)	Twister (1988)

Professional ratings
Review scores
Source	Rating
The Encyclopedia of Popular Music	3/5 stars
MusicHound Rock: The Essential Album Guide	2/5 stars
Spin Alternative Record Guide	7/10

Tink of S.E. is the third studio album by Washington, D.C., indie band Unrest, released in 1987 by TeenBeat Records.

The album was pressed in a run of 1,000 copies, with each copy decorated in a different way.

== Critical reception ==
The Encyclopedia of Popular Music called the album "a thorough investigation and reflection of the group's environment, mixing trash punk cover versions ... with touching vignettes of suburban and college life."

== Track listing ==
All tracks are written by Unrest, except "91st Century Schizoid Man" by King Crimson and "Wild Thing" by Chip Taylor.

Side one
No.	Title	Length
1.	"Can't Sit Still"	2:42
2.	"Cats"	1:17
3.	"Die Grünen"	2:43
4.	"Holiday in Berlin, part two"	1:56
5.	"91st Century Schizoid Man" (King Crimson cover)	3:27
6.	"The Hill, part two"	1:31
7.	"Picnic at Hanging Rock (The Hilltop, Part 3)"	3:28
8.	"Live on a Hot August Night"	3:59

Side two
No.	Title	Length
1.	"The Chastity Ballad"	2:41
2.	"Judy Says, part II"	2:35
3.	"Wild Thing" (The Troggs cover)	3:09
4.	"The Tundra"	2:47
5.	"Laughter"	2:25
6.	"The 'S' St. Shuffle With a Beat"	2:32
7.	"Over the Life"	2:38
8.	"HOPE"	4:08

== Personnel ==
Adapted from the Tink of S.E. liner notes.

Unrest

- Phil Krauth – drums, bass guitar, vibraphone, percussion, backing vocals, production
- Tim Moran – electric guitar, acoustic guitar, bass guitar, vocals, percussion
- Mark Robinson – vocals, electric guitar, bass guitar, drums, keyboards, percussion, production
- Chris Thomson – bass guitar, guitar, percussion, backing vocals

Additional musicians and production

- Richard Ashman – production, engineering
- Eli Janney – production
- Paul Kearny – production

== Release history ==
Region	Date	Label	Format	Catalog
United States	1987	TeenBeat	LP	TEENBEAT 14
