= Young Woman (painting) =

1937 painting by Isabel Bishop

- Artist: Isabel Bishop
- Year: 1937
- Medium: Oil and egg tempera on masonite
- Dimensions: 76.2 cm × 54.0 cm (30.0 in × 21.3 in)
- Location: Pennsylvania Academy of the Fine Arts; Philadelphia

Young Woman is a painting by Isabel Bishop (1902–1988). It is in the collection of the Pennsylvania Academy of the Fine Arts in Philadelphia, Pennsylvania in the United States.

== Description ==
Young Woman depicts a white woman staring left of center of the viewer. She is dressed professionally, wearing a hat, white blazer, a scarf, and an orange skirt. She carries a handbag and blue jacket in her right arm. Bishop was inspired by the style of the old masters, whose work she saw in person while visiting Europe in 1931, when creating this piece, which often involved the use of egg tempera, as used in this artwork. Like many works by Bishop, this painting may have taken a year or more for her to complete.

== Curatorial analysis ==
This painting is one of many that Bishop created examining the everyday life of young women in urban New York City, often working women.

== History ==
The painting was acquired with monies from the Henry D. Gilpin Fund in 1938. It is currently on view at the museum.
