= Manchester Digital Music Archive =

Music archive for bringing awareness of Greater Manchester's music

- Founders: Matthew Norman; Alison Surtees; Abigail Ward; CP Lee; Dave Rofe
- Registration no.: 1164179
- Legal status: Registered Charity
- Location: Online
- Region served: Greater Manchester
- Product: Online Community Archive
- Method: Volunteering
- Members: 3000
- Key people: Alison Surtees - Co Founder; Abigail Ward - Co Founder; Matthew Norman - Co Founder; Dave Rofe - Co Founder; CP Lee - Co Founder and Co Chair; Dave Carter - Co Chair; Aidan O'Rourke - Trustee; Cathy Brooks - Treasurer; Sarah Feinstein - Trustee
- Website: Manchester Digital Music Archive

Manchester Digital Music Archive (MDMarchive) is an online community archive founded in 2003 by Matthew Norman, Alison Surtees, Abigail Ward, CP Lee and Dave Rofe. It was created as a way of celebrating and raising awareness of Greater Manchester's musical heritage and protecting collections of material held by individuals and institutions relating to the subject. Towards the end of 2015 it became a registered charity.

== Beginnings ==
The archive, originally named Manchester District Music Archive, came about in 2003 after Surtees and Norman had the idea of making a documentary about the Greater Manchester music scene, loosely based on CP Lee's book ‘Shake, Rattle and Rain’. Realising the subject was too vast to be contained within a documentary, Surtees and Norman, alongside Dave Rofe and CP Lee, decided to launch a campaign to create a Greater Manchester music museum. Abigail Ward joined the team shortly afterwards and began to develop an online presence for the project. Lee's book covered the history of Manchester music from 1955 - 1995 and contained an extensive band list at the end of the book, which was used a starting point when populating the band list on the Manchester Digital Music Archive website.

A seminar was held at Urbis in 2004 to officially launch the newly constituted organisation with a panel featuring Jon Savage, CP Lee, Guy Garvey, Mark Radcliffe and Jan Hargreaves. Hundreds attended the event and it was announced that the intention was to set up a museum where people could donate items of music ephemera to the collection. The co-founders then spent a number of years trying to create a physical space for the archive but after years of struggling to find something suitable, a website was set up in 2006, which allowed users to upload images of their own personal artefacts, along with associated memories, relating to Greater Manchester music, musicians, DJs and venues. This online archive was developed by Abigail Ward with web designer Ashley Kennerley (Go Bang! Design).

In 2007 and 2014, Manchester Digital Music Archive won the Big Chip best not-for-profit project award.

Dave Rofe left the organisation in 2017.

As of September 2020 the site has in excess of 3600 members who have uploaded material relating to more than 3680 bands, 735 DJs and 1350 venues. Users are encouraged to provide memories and anecdotes along with their artefacts and the only stipulation is that items need to be linked to acts or venues from Greater Manchester. All genres of music are covered and as well as an extensive collection of pop memorabilia, the archive includes material relating to the history of the Royal Northern College of Music and the Halle Orchestra. Users can comment on and discuss items uploaded by others or curate online themed exhibitions using material from the site. The site has a number of these exhibitions on various subjects including Moss Side and Hulme club culture, City Fun fanzine, Manchester's LGBT music and club culture and Royal Northern College of Music students who served in World War I.

== Charitable status ==
In November 2015, the organisation became a registered charity and in June 2017 changed its name to Manchester Digital Music Archive. The board of trustees are Dave Carter, Cathy Brooks, Aidan O'Rourke and Sarah Feinstein.

== Physical Presence ==
The archive exists online but has held numerous events and exhibitions at venues around Greater Manchester. In 2008 it held an event at Islington Mill which explored the city's 1980s electro-funk scene, curated by DJ Greg Wilson. The event included music and discussion and also showed the premiere of the Tim Forde documentary 'Birth of The British B-Boy', which tells the story of breakdancing in Manchester.

=== Defining Me: Musical Adventures in Manchester ===
In 2013, following investment from Heritage Lottery Fund, MDMarchive held an exhibition, Defining Me: Musical Adventures in Manchester, at The Lowry, a 5-month show co-curated by members of MDMarchive's online community. The exhibition attracted a 32,000 visitors. There were a number of spin-off events featuring Greater Manchester music luminaries in conversation, including Barry Adamson, Kevin Cummins and Richard Boon. In 2014 the project ended with a community concert at Band on the Wall featuring British rave pioneer Graham Massey in collaboration with The Prospectors, a collective of disabled musicians from Stockport.

=== Louder Than Words ===
The archive also has a regular presence in the Louder Than Words festival - an annual event focused on literature within the music industry. In 2014 MDMarchive hosted a panel discussion which saw Elbow's Guy Garvey, Jaheda Choudhury-Potter of Ajah UK and Everything Everything's Jon Higgs talk about Greater Manchester lyricism in music. The following year it hosted another session, this time focusing on the work of virtual archives and included panellists from MDMarchive as well as writer Anita Sethi and Jez Collins from the Birmingham Music Archive.

=== Rebel Music: The Sound of Politics and Protest in Manchester ===
In 2017 Manchester Digital Music Archive won further investment from Heritage Lottery Fund for Rebel Music: The Sound of Politics and Protest in Manchester, a project exploring the intertwined histories of music and political activism across the ten boroughs of the Greater Manchester. The project focused in particular on the musical achievements of women and the LGBT+ community.

Throughout the project, MDMarchive worked with teams of volunteers from two chosen communities (women and LGBT+ people) to co-produce a programme of events, two physical pop-up exhibitions, a series of digital exhibitions, six short films and three guided heritage walks. Volunteers also accessed training on how to preserve and share their own musical heritage.

The first physical exhibition, Queer Noise: The History of LGBT+ Music & Club Culture in Manchester, was held at the People's History Museum from July–September 2017 as part of Never Going Underground 2017, a major exhibition marking 50 years since the partial decriminalisation of homosexuality. The second exhibition, Suffragette City took place in March 2018 at The Refuge, Manchester and coincided with 100 Years of Women's Suffrage.

=== We Are Dynamite! Northern Carnival Against the Nazis 40th Anniversary ===
In 2018 Manchester Digital Music Archive received funding from Heritage Lottery Fund and Futura Recruitment for a physical and digital project celebrating the Northern Carnival Against the Nazis, a march and concert held in Moss Side, Manchester in 1978 that is regarded by many as a defining moment in establishing anti-racism in the city and beyond.

The project comprised a physical exhibition held at NIAMOS (formerly the Nia Centre), Hulme; a digital community exhibition; and two large launch events.

== The Lapsed Clubber Audio Map ==
In 2017, Manchester Digital Music Archive launched the Lapsed Clubber Audio Map in partnership with Manchester Metropolitan University and Heritage Lottery Fund.

The map is a digital repository of spoken word memories relating to Greater Manchester's 'first decade of rave', 1985–1995.

Based on open-source Real Time Communication software called Web RTC, the map allows users to record voice memories using their web browsers and internal computer microphones. These 60-second clips of audio are then pinned to a Google Maps-based map of Greater Manchester.

== Death of CP Lee and departure of Abigail Ward ==
Co-founder CP Lee died on 25 July 2020, aged 70.

Abigail Ward, co-founder, archive manager and curator, left the organisation in September 2020 to focus on her music career.
