= Miaow (band) =

English indie band from Manchester

Miaow were an English indie band from Manchester, England, active between 1984 and 1988. They were led by singer and NME writer Cath Carroll, formerly of the band Glass Animals^{a}, on vocals and guitar, with Steve Maguire (guitar), Ron Caine (bass) and Chris Fenner (drums). Their debut single, "Belle Vue", was released in December 1985, the 12"-version featuring the track "Grocer's Devil Daughter", a song about Margaret Thatcher. The band's next release was the "Sport Most Royal" track that they contributed to the NME's C86 compilation in 1986. After supporting The Woodentops on their UK tour, two further singles followed in 1987 on Factory Records, the band also relocating to London. Carroll joined The Hit Parade and Miaow split up without releasing the promised album, titled 'Priceless Innuendo'. Cath Carroll subsequently married Big Black guitarist Santiago Durango and went on to a solo career in the 1990s.

== Discography ==
Chart placings shown are from the UK Indie Chart.

- "Belle Vue" / "Fate" (December 1985, Venus Records, VENUS1 [7"])
- "Belle Vue" / "Fate" / "Grocer's Devil Daughter" (December 1985, Venus Records, VENUS1T [12"])
- "When It All Comes Down" / "Did She" (February 1987, Factory Records, FAC179 [7"])
- "When It All Comes Down (Catechism)" / "Did She" / "When It All Comes Down" (February 1987, Factory Records, FAC179T [12"]) (No. 5)
- "Break The Code" / "Stolen Ears" (October 1987, Factory Records, FAC189 [7"]) (No. 18)
- When It All Comes Down (January 2003, LTM, compilation CD album)

== Notes ==
^a Not to be confused with the Oxford band also named Glass Animals.
