= Pork (disambiguation) =

Pork is a meat from pigs.

Pork can also refer to:

- Pork (band), Argentine post-grunge band
- PORK (magazine), a music magazine
- Pork Peninsula, a cape in Nunavut, Canada
- Pork Recordings, an electronic music label
- Pork barrel, in American political slang: federal politics dealing with funding of local projects with little or no national significance
- Sexual intercourse (slang)
- HMS Pork, nickname for front half of HMS Porcupine (G93) while she was in two parts in 1943
- Pork, a theatre play by Andy Warhol
- Porc, the Hungarian name for Porţ village, Marca Commune, Sălaj County, Romania
- Pork, an alternate name for the Dutch buckwheat-based dish Broeder
- Long pork, a term for human flesh eaten by cannibals
