= Porcupine (disambiguation) =

A porcupine is a mammal best known for its coat of sharp spines, or quills, that provides a defense from predators.

Porcupine may also refer to:

== Biology ==
- Porcupine caribou, a subspecies of the caribou also called Grant's caribou
- Porcupine flower, a plant from India
- Porcupinefish, also commonly called blowfish
- Porcupine, a protein encoded by the PORCN gene

== Places ==
- Porcupine Mountains, Michigan
- Porcupine Hills, Manitoba and Saskatchewan
- Porcupine Hills Formation, Alberta

=== Bodies of water ===
- Porcupine River, a river with its source in the Yukon that flows through Alaska
- Porcupine River (British Columbia), a tributary of the Stikine River in British Columbia
- Porcupine Creek, also known historically as the Porcupine River, a tributary of the Skagway River in Alaska
- Porcupine Bank, an area of seabed on the Irish shelf
  - Porcupine Seabight, a deep-water basin in the Porcupine Bank
  - Porcupine Abyssal Plain, an abyssal plain adjacent to the Irish continental margin

=== Parks ===
- Porcupine Provincial Forest, Saskatchewan and Manitoba
- Porcupine Flat Campground
- Porcupine Gorge National Park
- Porcupine Meadows Provincial Park, British Columbia

=== Towns ===
==== Australia ====
- Porcupine, Queensland, a locality in the Shire of Flinders

==== Canada ====
- Porcupine, Ontario, a neighbourhood of Timmins
- Rural Municipality of Porcupine No. 395, Saskatchewan
  - Porcupine Plain, Saskatchewan

==== United States ====
- Porcupine, North Dakota
- Porcupine, South Dakota
- Porcupine, Wisconsin

== Other uses ==
- Porcupine (album), by Echo & the Bunnymen
- Porcupine (Cheyenne) (c. 1848-1929), a chief and medicine man
- Porcupine (character), a fictional Marvel Comics character
- The Porcupine, a 1992 novel by Julian Barnes
- HMS Porcupine
- USS Porcupine (IX-126)
- AJS Porcupine, a racing motorcycle
- Porcupine Freedom Festival
- Porcupine Gold Rush
- A mascot of the Libertarian Party of the United States
- A participant in the Free State Project, an American political movement
- A nickname given to Larry Fine of The Three Stooges
- A nickname given to the 427 Chevrolet big-block
