= Imperial f.f.r.r. =

Studio album by Unrest
- Released: March 16, 1992
- Recorded: July 15 – July 27, 1991
- Studio: Fun City, NYC
- Length: 42:45
- Label: No.6/TeenBeat
- Producer: Phil Krauth, Mark Robinson, Wharton Tiers

Unrest chronology
Fuck Pussy Galore (& All Her Friends) (1992)	Imperial f.f.r.r. (1992)	Isabel Bishop (1993)

Imperial f.f.r.r. is the sixth studio album by Washington, D.C. indie rock band Unrest, released on March 16, 1992 by No.6 Records and TeenBeat Records.

== Critical reception ==
Professional ratings
Review scores
Source	Rating
AllMusic	4.5/5 stars
Chicago Tribune	3.5/4 stars
NME	7/10
Pitchfork	8.2/10
Q	4/5 stars
Select	3/5
Spin Alternative Record Guide	8/10
Stylus Magazine	A−
The Village Voice	C
Vox	7/10

=== Accolades ===
Year	Publication	Country	Accolade	Rank
1992	Spin	United States	"Albums of the Year"	8
1998	Alternative Press	United States	"The 90 Greatest Albums of the '90s"	73
"*" denotes an unordered list.

== Track listing ==
All lyrics are written by Unrest; all music is composed by Unrest.

No.	Title	Length
1.	"Volume Reference Tone"	0:15
2.	"Suki"	3:33
3.	"Imperial"	7:51
4.	"I Do Believe You Are Blushing"	4:58
5.	"Champion Nines"	3:22
6.	"Sugarshack"	4:06
7.	"Isabel"	2:15
8.	"Cherry Cream On"	3:56
9.	"Firecracker"	3:07
10.	"June"	4:01
11.	"Loyola"	5:52
Total length:		42:45

UK issue bonus tracks
No.	Title	Length
12.	"Yes She Is My Skinhead Girl"	4:26
13.	"Hydrofoil No. 1"	2:08
14.	"Full Frequency"	13:56
15.	"Wednesday & Proud"	4:26

2005 remastered CD bonus tracks
No.	Title	Length
12.	"Electrico"	0:46
13.	"Hydrofoil No. 1"	2:06
14.	"Full Frequency"	13:48
15.	"Isabel" (12" version)	3:10
16.	"Cherry Cherry"	3:59
17.	"Wednesday & Proud"	4:25
18.	"Empire"	2:30
19.	"Rip-Off"	2:28
20.	"Chdemo"	2:14

== Personnel ==
Adapted from the Imperial f.f.r.r. liner notes.

Unrest

- Bridget Cross – bass guitar, backing vocals
- Phil Krauth – drums, bells, backing vocals, production
- Mark Robinson – vocals, electric guitar, twelve-string guitar, sampler, bells, production

Production and additional personnel

- Wharton Tiers – production, engineering, recording
- Terry Tolkin – recording
- Trevor Kampmann – remastering

== Release history ==
Region	Date	Label	Format	Catalog
United States	1992	No.6/TeenBeat	CD, LP	kar 018, TEENBEAT 77
United Kingdom	1992	Guernica	CD, CS, LP	GU 1
United States	2005	TeenBeat	CD	TEENBEAT 77
United States	2009	TeenBeat	LP	TEENBEAT 77
