= England Made Me (film) =

1973 British film by Peter Duffell

- Original British quad poster
- Directed by: Peter Duffell
- Written by: Desmond Cory; Peter Duffell
- Based on: the novel by Graham Greene
- Produced by: Jack Levin
- Starring: Peter Finch; Michael York; Hildegarde Neil
- Cinematography: Ray Parslow
- Edited by: Malcolm Cooke
- Music by: John Scott
- Production companies: Atlantic Productions; Centralni Filmski Studio; Two World Film
- Distributed by: Hemdale Film Distribution (UK)
- Release date: 18 November 1973
- Running time: 102 minutes
- Country: United Kingdom
- Language: English

England Made Me is a 1973 British drama film directed by Peter Duffell, starring Peter Finch, Michael York, Hildegarde Neil, and Michael Hordern, and based on the 1935 novel England Made Me by Graham Greene.

It concerns Anthony Farrant, a naive young Englishman who visits Germany on the way home from abroad, and finds a job with charismatic financier Erich Krogh. While Anthony was taught to value fairness and decency, in Erich's world opportunism, corruption, and decadence hold sway.

The film changes the novel's setting from Sweden to Nazi Germany. Duffell explained that he changed the location due to his lack of knowledge of Sweden in the 1930s, the use of imagery the audience would recognise and the growing menace in Europe of the time.

== Plot ==
France, 1935. Englishwoman Kate Farrant works for industrialist Erich Krogh, whose mistress she is. She reunites with her brother Tony, who has quit yet another job. Kate is returning to Germany; she persuades Tony to come with her, saying that Krogh could find him work.

In a Berlin bar, Tony gets talking to Minty, an English journalist. Minty hopes Tony can get him information on Krogh, for which he offers to pay. At a formal meeting, Krogh suggests Tony have a job liaising with publicity; Tony eagerly says he's already made contact with local journalists, which horrifies Krogh.

While Tony flirts with Liz, an English girl he has met, Krogh discusses his worries with Kate: his business is failing, he needs investors, and the only option left to him verges on fraud. Tony wants to have sex with Liz but doesn't know anyone in town, so they visit Minty. When Minty says he has to leave for work, Tony asks if he and Liz can stay. After they've had sex, she asks if he'll return to England with her, but he can't because of his job.

Kate tells Tony she's marrying Krogh so the three of them can be together forever, as she's always wanted. Krogh calls to say he is throwing a party at his lakeside villa and has invited a Reichsminister. He wants to leave the country, probably for England. When he understands Krogh's business plans, Tony is shocked: 'It's a swindle!' Kate emphasizes the importance of the press not finding out.

Tony sees Liz off at the airport. Minty is there, spying on them. Tony promises Liz that he'll abandon his job and rejoin her in England within the week. He sees Minty and invites him for a drink. Tony tells Minty about his plans to return to England, the looming party, and Kate and Krogh's marriage. Minty instantly scurries away. Krogh's assistant Haller tells Krogh that the Reichsminister suspects something (Krogh's firm have been buying their own stocks) and will stop Krogh leaving the country.

Idling at Krogh's offices, Tony leafs through a file. When Kate enters, she grabs it and warns him to keep quiet. Tony tells her he's returning to England; she correctly intuits it's because of Liz: 'I can't appeal to you like she can!' Knowing that he'll be broke when he returns, she gives him money, wondering why she can refuse him nothing.

At the party, guests get increasingly drunk on Krogh's champagne, while Krogh and Haller play cards with Nazi bigwigs: the Reichsminister asks Krogh 'for a little informal chat tomorrow'.

Fromm, a Jewish acquaintance of Krogh's, appears at the villa. His son has been arrested and he wants an audience with Krogh. Haller beats him and throws him out. Tony sees this and tries to intervene, though Kate restrains him. Tony rants angrily against Krogh, mentioning that he has falsified business records. Kate impulsively silences Tony by kissing him on the lips. Haller witnesses all this.

The following day, Kate reads in an English-language newspaper that she's marrying Krogh. Krogh knows this is because Tony has told Minty. He thinks Tony's departure 'inconvenient' but believes he can stop it.

Tony writes Minty a letter. When Kate enters, he rapidly hides it. On their way back from the disastrous meeting with the Reichsminister, Krogh and Haller discuss ways of stopping Tony returning to England. Haller suggests getting him into a card game and making sure he loses, so that he won't have money to travel.

At the game, Tony chats about his impending departure as Haller and Krogh exchange glances. Everyone folds except Haller and Tony, who while talking about his terrible hand has been practicing a poker face: he has a straight flush. Tony collects his winnings and walks to the station. When he stops to light a cigarette, he sees Haller behind him.

Haller returns to the villa, looking shaken. As dawn breaks over the lake, Tony's body can be seen floating.

Tony's letter arrives at Minty's lodgings, but before he can open it, Haller arrives. He bribes Minty, whose newspaper then runs a piece saying Tony's death was accidental. Kate packs her belongings and walks out on Krogh.

== Main cast ==
- Peter Finch as Erich Krogh
- Michael York as Anthony Farrant
- Hildegarde Neil as Kate Farrant
- Joss Ackland as Haller
- Michael Hordern as F. Minty
- Tessa Wyatt as Liz Davidge
- Michael Sheard as Fromm
- Richard Gibson as young Tony
- Lalla Ward as young Kate
- William Baskiville as Stein
- Demeter Bitenc as Reichsminister
- Vladan Živković as Heinrich
- Vlado Bacic as Hartmann
- Mirjana Nikolic as Nikki

== Production ==
=== Development ===
Graham Greene repeatedly named the novel as a favourite among his own works: "I have a particularly soft spot for England Made Me"; "I have always had a soft spot in my heart for my fifth published novel, England Made Me (a feeling which has not been shared by the general public)". He retained the film rights for over 30 years, hoping (according to some sources) to adapt it himself. Critic Philip Strick suggests that Greene, fully aware of the liberties moviemakers could take with source novels, (Note: Greene had been particularly vocal in his contempt for the Hollywood adaptations of The Power and the Glory and The Quiet American.) was reluctant in this case because of the book's personal nature. (Note: Greene acknowledged that the main character of Tony in England Made Me "was an idealized portrait of my eldest brother Herbert, and I had myself shared many of Anthony's experiences". In private correspondence, he was more outspoken about Herbert, unable to hold down a job and dependent on their parents for money: "The man's an utter bounder... if he'd had the self respect of a louse he'd have done himself in by this time"; "I wish to goodness he'd shoot himself... Killing would be no murder in his case".)

American producer Jack Levin approached Peter Duffell to direct in 1971, after Lars-Magnus Lindgren and Alan Schneider had proved unavailable. The screenplay to be used, by Wolf Mankowitz, retained the Swedish setting but moved the action to the present day: Duffell recalled "lots of pot smoking and copulation. I really didn't reckon it at all".

The script ultimately used, by Duffell and Desmond Cory, stayed in the 1930s but moved the plot from Sweden to Germany; it also removed the detail that Tony and Kate are twins. Duffell admitted that "One of the key things in the novel is that it is about siblings. Yet one had seen so many disastrous attempts to do twins on the screen." (Note: Critic Les Keyser felt this detail reflected the obsession in Greene's early fiction with the "idea of the double, the doppelganger, the divided mind".)

=== Pre-Production ===
Duffell's first choice to play Krogh was Joss Ackland (who ended up in the subsidiary role of Haller). The film-makers needed a box-office draw in order to get financial backing, however, and approached Peter Finch for the part. Finch, who had appeared in an earlier Greene adaptation, The Heart of the Matter (1953), admired the novelist and accepted. Even after Finch's involvement had made it financially viable, the film's budget was less than one million dollars.

Michael York rejected the offer to play Tony, as he had just played an Englishman in 1930s Germany in Cabaret ("it would have been just a repeat performance"), then felt he'd made "a stupid, superficial judgment" and called the producers back to accept. Duffell considered Susannah York for the part of Kate, but she was committed to filming Images for Robert Altman. Also unavailable was Denholm Elliott, his first choice for Minty, ultimately played by Michael Hordern.

=== Filming ===
Shooting took place in Belgrade and other parts of Yugoslavia. York as Tony makes his first appearance, disembarking from a steamship, in Rijeka harbour; the scene where he and Kate reunite at a French seaside resort was filmed in Opatija; the lakeside villa where Krogh throws a party for Nazi dignitaries was actually on the shores of Lake Bled and had been used as a residence by Josip Broz Tito.

Greene had based the character of Swedish financier Erik Krogh on Ivar Kreuger: reimagined as a German, "Erich Krogh" resembled a "Krupp-type munitions tycoon", and during filming Finch studied William Manchester's history of the Krupp dynasty for an understanding of the story's background.

=== Soundtrack ===
The soundtrack album John Scott – England Made Me to the film was released on vinyl, LP by DJM Records (UK) in 1973.

The song Remembering (written-by John Scott and Arthur Hamilton, arranged by Larry Wilcox) sung by Lana Cantrell, was released on vinyl, LP (US) by East Coast Records.

== Themes ==
Among the film's changes to the novel is that it foregrounds political themes. Greene commented on his original novel, "The subject – apart from the economic background of the thirties and that sense of capitalism staggering from crisis to crisis – was simple and unpolitical, a brother and sister in the confusion of incestuous love." By contrast, he said of the film:

Altering the scene to Nazi Germany... in a way altered the whole balance of the piece. It was based on the Match King in Sweden who was a crook. But a man who is trying to get his money illegally out of a Nazi Germany is a kind of hero, as it were. And that affects the whole picture. Krogh becomes a good character instead of the bad character he was in the book.

Patrick Gibbs agreed: "the chilly central character of the international financier [is] made considerably more sympathetic by his frauds now being worked not on investors, but on the Nazi government".

Les Keyser, however, thought the Krogh of the film just as ruthless as in Greene's novel, as complicit in Nazism as Greene's Krogh is in capitalism: "Even Krogh's attempts to dupe the Nazis and flee to England are a form of self-deception: he seems blind to the fact that he (like Krupp) is one of the damned. His inhumane scheming and his role in the treachery that destroys Tony and alienates Kate is an embryonic form of the national horrors to come." He summed up the character as "a Krupp figure too blind to see his role in the rise of a fascism he purports to reject".

Keyser noted the role of antisemitism in the film's plot, embodied in the character of Fromm: "Duffell replaces the original focus in the novel on the plight of labor with a focus on the plight of Jews." He also commented on "the reversal of sexual roles" between the two siblings: Kate has acquired "all the masculine traits of reliability and efficiency... leaving Tony only charm, a rather feminine virtue." Gibbs likewise noticed "the strong character of the sister complementing the brother's weakness with jobs and women", though he also remarked "it is he who turns out, so awkwardly for Krogh, to have moral scruples".

== Critical reception ==
Derek Malcolm in The Guardian called the film "a careful, intelligent and very viewable film with a lot of atmosphere... If it looks like "Cabaret" without music, it is probably because Isherwood's Berlin stories had a similar sense of decay and gay despair". He commended all the main players and summed up, "it's certainly one of the most watchable British efforts on the market just now and by some way the weightiest offering of the week". (Note: Other pictures released in Britain the same week included Godspell and Billy Wilder's Avanti!.)

David Robinson, in The Times, was unsure that relocating the action to 1930s Berlin was wise – "the familiar symbols (not even excluding the obligatory cabaret and decadent party scene) remove any of the ambivalence of the novel's original atmosphere" – but singled out for praise the production values and the acting, especially Hordern's supporting performance as Minty, "flapping around in a greasy mac, and peering through a fog of smoke as he indecently mouths his worn-out fag-ends".

Patrick Gibbs wrote a positive review for The Daily Telegraph, calling the film "a very polished little piece". He felt that the change of setting from Sweden to Germany was warranted by Greene's own comment, in a reissue of the novel, that the period had been overshadowed by "the rise of Hitler".

In another positive review, for The Sunday Times, Derek Prouse likewise thought the transposing of the action "valid": "the locations and set dressing are a potent asset in the creation of an atmosphere of quiet menace".

George Melly, reviewing for The Observer, also felt that the change in location was effective, but had reservations: "That street of Jewish shops, with its broken windows and the Star of David daubed on the walls, is fast becoming as much a cinematic cliché as the Western street, with its saloon bar, bank and Sheriff's office." Nonetheless, he praised York's performance as the protagonist, even though the actor's casting evoked memories of the recent Cabaret, and concluded: "This is a worthwhile film, broadly faithful in spirit to Greene's intentions and well acted down to the smallest supporting part."

The New York Times wrote of the film, "England Made Me might have worked, were Mr. Duffell and Mr. Cory less superficial movie makers. They've retained a surprising amount of the Greene plot, even a lot of original dialogue, but the story is no longer comic and rueful, just wildly melodramatic."

Pauline Kael in The New Yorker thought it a lightweight adaptation of an apprentice work by Greene, but entertaining nonetheless. She found the film's nostalgic recreation of 1930s Germany paradoxically enjoyable: "You're not quite sure if it's all right to feel this way, but at times you may find yourself thinking, I'd love to be there." As well as praising the three main players, Kael wrote, "Michael Hordern gives such a marvellously flamboyant seedy performance as Minty that one wants to applaud him."

Les Keyser wrote a lengthy and positive review for Literature/Film Quarterly. Whereas critics such as Rex Reed had slated Finch's performance as somnolent ("as though it were dawn and his alarm clock didn't go off"), Keyser thought it powerfully restrained: "Krogh in the film is a monomaniac, totally dehumanized by his work, and Finch's studied iciness seems perfect for the role." Keyser also praised the production values and Michael Hordern, whom he called "one of the finest character actors working in film today".

Leslie Halliwell called the film a "lively, intelligent character melodrama", highlighting Duffell's direction and Finch and Hordern's performances.

Greene himself attended a preview of the film in Wardour Street and wrote Duffell a note saying, "Pleased enough"; he thought the movie "a good little film... I liked Duffell's direction and a lot of the acting". Regardless of its change of setting, the film preserved his vision of the three main characters, whom he thought well played. He later told The Guardian that it was one of the few screen adaptations of his books that he approved of, and had wanted Duffell, whom he called "a friend of mine", to write and direct The Honorary Consul.

Film 4 called it "an underrated adaptation of Graham Greene's novel ... Although it received little attention when first released, this fascinating character study is ripe for reappraisal now, with the relationship between the two men making for quietly gripping viewing."

== Accolades ==
Tony Woollard's art direction was nominated for a BAFTA Award.

== Bibliography ==
- Falk, Quentin (2014). Travels in Greeneland: The Cinema of Graham Greene (4th ed.). Dahlonega, GA: University Press of North Georgia. ISBN 978-1-940771-13-7.
- Greene, Graham (1995) [1st pub. Carcanet Press 1993]. "The Novelist and the Cinema – A Personal Experience". In Parkinson, David (ed.). The Graham Greene Film Reader: Reviews, Essays, Interviews and Film Stories. New York: Applause Books. pp. 441–445. ISBN 1-55783-188-2.
- Greene, Graham (1981) [1st pub. Bodley Head 1980]. Ways of Escape. Harmondsworth: Penguin Books. ISBN 014018581X.
- Keyser, Les (1974). "England Made Me". Literature/Film Quarterly. 2 (4): 363–372. JSTOR 43792844.
- Sherry, Norman (1990). The Life of Graham Greene, Volume One: 1904-1939. London: Penguin Books. ISBN 0-14-013123-X.
- Shuttleworth, Martin; Raven, Simon (1973). "The Art of Fiction: Graham Greene". In Hynes, Samuel (ed.). Graham Greene: A Collection of Critical Essays. Englewood Cliffs, NJ: Prentice-Hall. pp. 154–167. ISBN 0-13-362251-7.
- York, Michael (1991). Accidentally on Purpose: An Autobiography. New York: Simon & Schuster. ISBN 978-0-6716-8940-7.
