= Pork (band) =

Argentine post-grunge band

- Pork in 2014

Background information
- Origin: Buenos Aires, Argentina
- Genre: Post-grunge
- Years active: 2002–2016
- Labels: Universal Music Argentina; Batacazo
- Members: Cesar Bar Rabia; Ton Bar Rabia; Nino Conde; Max Mateo
- Website: porkmusic.com

Pork is an Argentine post-grunge band founded in 2002 by the Bar Rabia twins. The band members are the Bar Rabia twins (Czar and Gaston), Nino Conde and Max Mateo.

== History ==
In August 2006, Pork supported American band Fear Factory at the Pepsi Stadium in Buenos Aires, drawing the attention of Alejandro Taranto, an executive producer for bands such as A.N.I.M.A.L. and Los Fabulosos Cadillacs. He later had Pork signed onto TommyGun Entertainment and Universal Music Argentina to record their debut album.

The recording sessions took place between April and June 2007 at "Del Cielito Studio", which is now owned by local band Bersuit Vergarabat. The post-production and mastering was done by Eduardo Bergallo. The album, titled "Multiple Choice", was released in May 2008. The song "Akira" was the first single, and a video involving an anime character and the band can be seen on MTV and Much Music.

In July 2008, Pork played at the Adolescent Fest sponsored by MTV. In October 2008, Pork was selected to support American band Nine Inch Nails, playing right before the main act.

The band is currently inactive until further notice.

== Members ==
- Cesar Bar Rabia – Vocals/AGuitar
- Ton Bar Rabia – Guitar
- Nino Conde – Bass/Guitar
- David Ortiz – Bass
- Fer Santana – Drums
- Max Mateo – (2012)
- Paulo Torres – (2002–2011)

== Discography ==
=== Albums ===
Year	Album	Label
2008	Multiple Choice	TommyGun-Universal Music Argentina
2010	The Pork Music Experiment	Batacazo
2013	Nace una Nueva Gente	Saturno
