= England Made Me (novel) =

1935 novel by Graham Greene

- First edition (publ. Heinemann)
- Author: Graham Greene
- Language: English
- Publication date: 1935

England Made Me or The Shipwrecked is an early novel by Graham Greene. It was first published in 1935, and was republished as The Shipwrecked in 1953.

It is set in Stockholm (which Greene visited in 1933 to prepare for writing the novel) and concerns the travails of ne'er-do-well Anthony Farrant who finds himself working as a bodyguard to a dubious Swedish financier whose character is loosely inspired by Ivar Kreuger. In typical Greene fashion, the seedy antihero wrestles with his conscience as murky moral dilemmas begin to trouble even his disreputable soul.

== Plot ==
Anthony, in his thirties, charming and broke, is back in London from the Far East after being fired from every job, kicked out of every club and left by every woman. His twin sister Kate comes over from Stockholm to rescue him. She is secretary and mistress to Krogh, a self-made millionaire who owns a multinational financial empire. The austere Krogh likes Anthony's devil-may-care attitude and hires him as a personal bodyguard. But Anthony always lets people down. He lets down Kate, who hoped for his company as an antidote to Krogh's, by chasing women. And he lets down Krogh by failing to protect him from an embittered employee, upon which an old associate of Krogh's called Hall beats the man up. Unhappy with the job, Anthony betrays both Kate and Krogh by resigning. When a further betrayal emerges, that Anthony has been leaking secrets of Krogh's private life and business to the press, Hall quietly kills him and tips the body into the sea. Losing brother, lover and job, Kate decides to move on "like Anthony" heading for Copenhagen. Krogh has lost his right-hand woman and bedmate, but his fraudulent empire continues.

== Themes ==
A strong theme is the questionably close bond between the protagonist, the always ineffectual Anthony, and his twin sister Kate. Their parents are dead and her life as aide and live-in mistress to the crooked tycoon, Krogh, who is no great lover, absorbs her time and energy but leaves her emotionally unfulfilled. By getting Anthony to Stockholm and on Krogh's payroll, she is hoping for a much closer relationship with her brother, who is charming, unreliable and always broke. His failure to respond, and the unhappy ending, leaves her in an even worse position as Krogh's artificial empire threatens to unravel.

== Reception ==
In its review the New Statesman said that "Greene arouses responses of curiosity and attention comparable to those set up by Malraux, Faulkner and Hemingway" while The Daily Telegraph termed him never less than "wonderfully readable". The New York Times concluded its review by asserting that "Too often the author of England Made Me seems to be shadow-boxing, not delivering the full punch. But the story is skillfully fabricated, and the suspense so well maintained that any one who starts it is certain to go to the end."

== Adaptations ==
It was made into a film in 1973, starring Michael York as Anthony, but the setting was changed to Nazi Germany.
