= Terry Tolkin =

American music executive and music journalist (1959–2022)

- Born: September 10, 1959; Kansas, U.S.
- Died: January 21, 2022 (aged 62); New Orleans, Louisiana, U.S.
- Occupations: A&R representative, music executive, music journalist
- Known for: Touch & Go Records, Rough Trade Records, No.6 Records, Elektra Records

Terry Tolkin (September 10, 1959 – January 21, 2022) was an American music executive and music journalist.

In the 1980s, Tolkin worked for several record labels, including Touch & Go Records, Rough Trade Records, and his own No.6 Records. From 1992 to 1996, he was an A&R representative for Elektra Records, where he signed alternative groups such as Stereolab and Afghan Whigs.

== Early career ==
Tolkin grew up in Kansas and New York City.

Tolkin has been credited for coining the term "alternative music" in 1979 while writing for the trade publication Rockpool. Tolkin never disputed that claim, but it is undetermined whether he was the first to use the term. He also worked at the 99 Records store in New York City and as a booker at New York clubs such as Danceteria and CBGB.

== Record industry career ==
Tolkin worked for several independent and major labels over the course of his career. While working for Touch & Go Records, he signed the Butthole Surfers and the Virgin Prunes. In the late 1980s, Tolkin worked for Rough Trade Records and established his label No.6 Records as a subsidiary. No.6 released music by artists such as Unrest, future Hollywood director Alex McAulay, Tindersticks, and Dean Wareham.

In 1988, Tolkin conceived and produced the alternative rock tribute album The Bridge: A Tribute To Neil Young," which featured many new and upcoming bands who would later achieve commercial and critical success, including Pixies, Sonic Youth, Dinosaur Jr., The Flaming Lips, Soul Asylum, Nick Cave and Psychic TV. Over 80% percent of the profits from The Bridge went directly to The Bridge School, an organization for children suffering from Cerebral Palsy run by Neil Young and his wife Pegi. Young once said of the project, "I love it! We played it on the tour bus all year long!" while Rolling Stone called The Bridge "one of the best conceived and executed" tribute albums of all time.

In the late 1980s, Tolkin worked as A&R for Rough Trade Records.

Tolkin was part of the A&R team at Elektra Records from 1992 to 1996. During his tenure with the label he signed Luna, Stereolab, Afghan Whigs, Scrawl, Vaganza, and others. Wareham wrote the Luna song "Chinatown" from the 1995 album Penthouse about Tolkin.

In April 2009, Teenbeat Records released a compilation of all the No.6 Records 7" singles on a 2-CD set titled "Speed Dating: The No.6 Records Compendium."

In 2015, Dean Wareham reported that Tolkin had an undisclosed illness, which Wareham described as a "Rare and aggressive virus that has his doctors perplexed." That year, Wareham sold an EP of early demos from his band Luna, which Tolkin had signed to Elektra, on Bandcamp to help Tolkin pay medical bills.

== Death ==
Tolkin died on January 21, 2022, at the age of 62 in New Orleans of complications related to an HIV infection.
