= No.6 Records =

Independent record label

No.6 Records was an independent record label, started in 1989 as a subsidiary of Rough Trade Records by A&R representative and booking agent Terry Tolkin. The name of the label came from the British television series The Prisoner; the main character was known in the series as "Number 6". Their early releases of note include The Bridge: A Tribute to Neil Young, which received a four star review in Rolling Stone, featuring exclusive tracks from highly influential indie and grunge bands Psychic TV, Sonic Youth, The Flaming Lips, Soul Asylum, and The Pixies, and Guitarrorists featuring members of Dinosaur Jr., Babes in Toyland, and Big Black. No.6 Records later became associated with Elektra Records, continuing to release albums and EPs by alternative rock bands including Luna, Vegetarian Meat, Afghan Whigs, Tindersticks, Charles Douglas, Unrest, Jennyanykind, Jule Brown, Beme Seed, and Nada Surf. The label was disbanded in 1999 after ten years and fifty releases. In April 2009 Teenbeat Records released a compilation of all the No.6 Records 7" singles, entitled Speed Dating: The No.6 Records Compendium.
