= Unrest (American band) =

American indie rock band

Background information
- Origin: Washington, D.C.
- Genres: Indie pop; indie rock
- Years active: 1983–1994, 2005, 2010
- Labels: TeenBeat; 4AD; Caroline; Matador; No.6
- Past members: Mark Robinson; Tim Moran; Philip Krauth; Chris Thomson; Dave Park; Justin Chearno; Bridget Cross

Unrest was an indie rock band from the Washington, D.C., area. It was one of Mark Robinson's projects for what would eventually become the TeenBeat label, also created by Robinson while in high school. Developing from an experimental approach of never playing the same song twice, earlier material seemed to be influenced by everything from punk to funk to Ennio Morricone. Original members Robinson (guitar) and drummer Philip Krauth were joined by Bridget Cross on bass in 1990 and their sound evolved into a minimalist but lively kind of pop. The two full-length albums released with this line up, 1992's Imperial f.f.r.r. and 1993's Perfect Teeth (distributed by the influential British label 4AD Records) featured pop songs interspersed with avant-garde percussive and sonic tracks, sometimes featuring nothing but white noise, beeps or sirens. EPs released around the same time period reveal a more pronounced gap between pop and experimental elements. The group broke up in 1994 with Krauth pursuing a solo career and Robinson and Cross continued for a time as Air Miami, which released two singles and one album, me me me. Since Air Miami's demise in the mid '90s, Robinson has continued to release various solo projects, as well as albums with his bands Cotton Candy and Flin Flon, and continues to run the TeenBeat label as well.

On February 24, 2005, Unrest played a one-time reunion show at Washington's Black Cat club as a part of the TeenBeat Records 20th anniversary celebration. Also appearing were Eggs, +/-, True Love Always, The Fontaine Toups, and Jonny Cohen.

On April 22, 2008, Teenbeat released an album by Cross under the alias Maybe It's Reno. The self-titled album features Robinson and Krauth on the first seven tracks, almost equating this project to another reunion of Unrest, though this time, all of the songs are written by Cross and she also performs all of the vocals.

Unrest reunited again for a small east coast tour in July 2010.

== Discography ==
=== Albums ===
- Unrest, TeenBeat Records (TEENBEAT 2), (05/01/1985) CS
- Lisa Carol Freemont, TeenBeat Records (TEENBEAT 6), (August 29, 1985) CS
- Tink of S.E., TeenBeat Records (TEENBEAT 14), (October 31, 1987) LP
- Malcolm X Park, TeenBeat Records (TEENBEAT 21)/ Caroline Records, (October 31, 1988) LP/CS
- Kustom Karnal Blackxploitation, TeenBeat Records (TEENBEAT 21)/ Caroline Records, (04/06/1990) LP/CS
- Imperial f.f.r.r., TeenBeat Records (TEENBEAT 77)/ Caroline Records/ No.6 Records/ Guernica, (March 16, 1992) LP/CD/CS
- Perfect Teeth, TeenBeat Records (TEENBEAT 119)/ 4AD, (08/07/1993) 7-inch Box Set/LP/CD/CS

=== Singles ===
- Unrest, TeenBeat Records (TEENBEAT 7), (11/07/1985) 7-inch
- Catchpellet, TeenBeat Records (TEENBEAT 28), (03/01/1989) 7-inch
- Catch of the Day, split single with Shudder to Think, Big Dragg Records (1990) 7-inch
- Cherry Cherry, TeenBeat Records (TEENBEAT 49)/ Hemiola Records, (03/11/1991) 7-inch
- Yes, She Is My Skinhead Girl, TeenBeat Records (TEENBEAT 42)/ K Records (IPU 17), (March 16, 1991) 7-inch
- A Factory Record, TeenBeat Records (TEENBEAT 63)/ Sub Pop, (04/08/1991) 7-inch
- Bavarian Mods & Other Hits, TeenBeat Records (TEENBEAT 84)/ Homestead Records, (January 27, 1992) 7-inch
- So Sick, TeenBeat Records (TEENBEAT 98), (August 23, 1993) 7-inch
- Where Are All Those Puerto Rican Boys? / Mountain with Stereolab, TeenBeat Records (TEENBEAT 121), (October 13, 1993) split 7-inch
- Make Out Club (Remix), TeenBeat Records (TEENBEAT 126C/D), (December 17, 1993) 7-inch
- Animal Park, TeenBeat Records (TEENBEAT 133C/D), (February 23, 1994) 7-inch

=== EPs ===
- Isabel Bishop, TeenBeat Records (TEENBEAT 70)/ 4AD, (July 21, 1992) 7-inch/12-inch/CD
- Cath Carroll, TeenBeat Records (TEENBEAT 105)/ 4AD, (June 23, 1993) 7-inch/12-inch/CD

=== Compilations ===
- Lisa Carol Freemont, TeenBeat Records (TEENBEAT 6), (August 29, 1985) CS
- Extremism in Defense of Liberty is No Vice, TeenBeat Records (TEENBEAT 1), (February 23, 1985) CS
- The Trouble with Harry, TeenBeat Records (TEENBEAT 11), (January 25, 1986) CS
- Twister, TeenBeat Records (TEENBEAT 23), (September 9, 1988) CS
- Magic Ribbons, 7-inch, Leopard Gecko Records (LG 005) (1991) 7-inch box set compilation
- Teenbeat 50, TeenBeat Records (TEENBEAT 50)/ Matador Records, (11/12/1993) CD/LP/CS
- Afternoon Delight: Love Songs From Sub Pop, Sub Pop (1992)
- International Hip Swing, K Records (1993)
- The Machines: Simple Machines 7-inchs (1990–1993), Simple Machines Records (SMR19), (1994)
- Fuck Pussy Galore (& All Her Friends), TeenBeat Records (TEENBEAT 67)/ Matador Records, (December 13, 1993) LP/CD/CS
- B.P.M. (1991–1994), TeenBeat Records (TEENBEAT 175), (June 20, 1995) LP/CD/CS

=== Live albums ===
- Live at DC Space with Dustdevils, Easy Records (Easy 6)/ TeenBeat Records (TEENBEAT 41), (February 15, 1990) CS
- Newcastle, August 4, 1993, TeenBeat Records (TEENBEAT 462), (September 28, 2009) CD
- Washington D.C., February 24, 2005, TeenBeat Records (TEENBEAT 469), (September 28, 2009) CD
