= Wharton Tiers =

American record producer (born 1953)

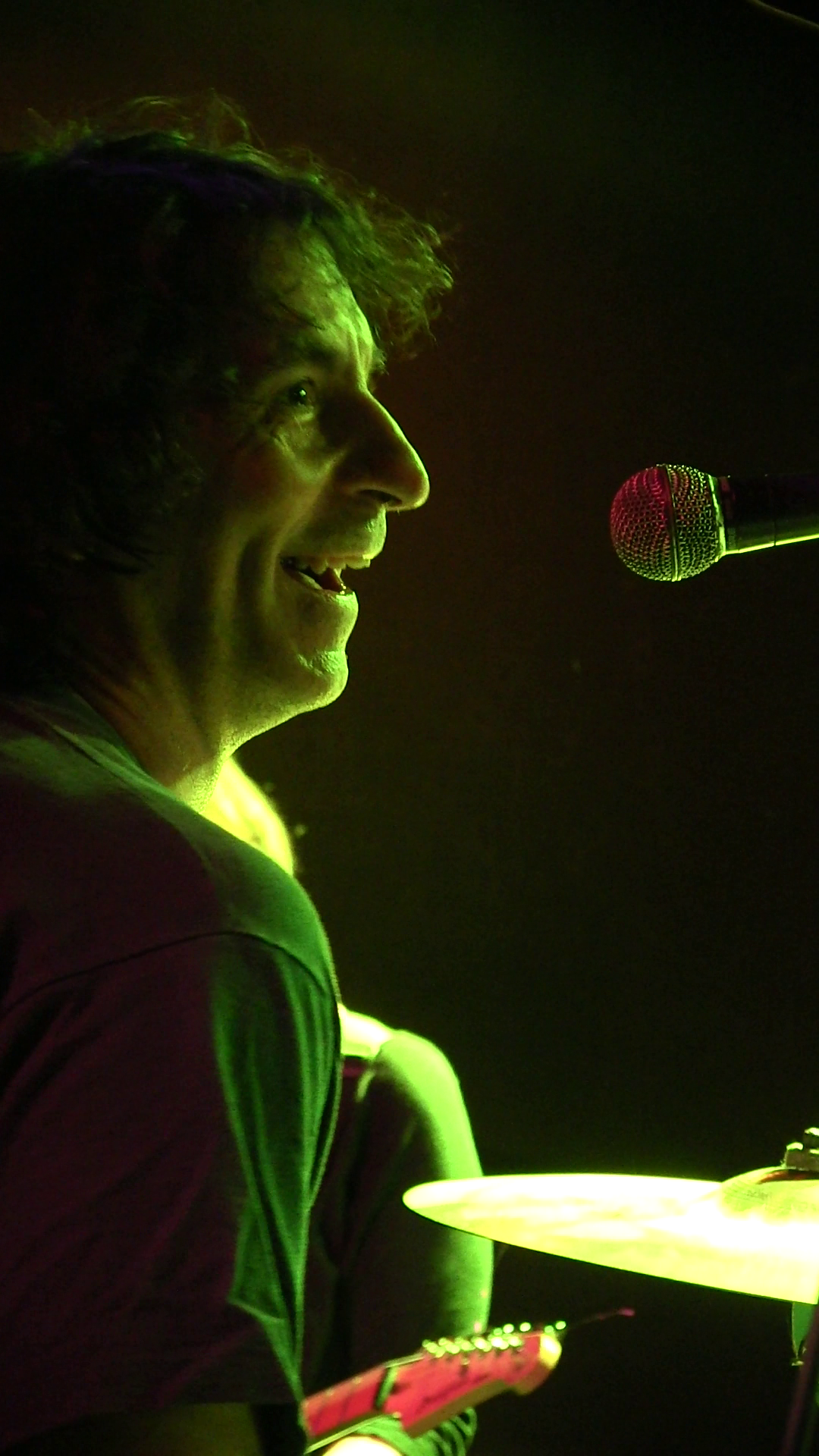
Wharton Tiers at Saint Vitus in Brooklyn

Wharton Tiers (born 1953, in Philadelphia) is an American audio engineer, record producer, drummer and percussionist.

== Biography ==
After receiving a diploma from Villanova University (Radnor Township, Delaware County, Pennsylvania), he moved to New York City in 1976 and was part of the No Wave scene.

As an audio engineer, record producer and mixer, he has worked on projects with artists such as Sonic Youth, Glenn Branca, Biohazard, Das Damen, Hole, Prong, Nick Cave and the Bad Seeds, Born Against, Teenage Fanclub, Unsane, Dinosaur Jr, White Zombie, Quicksand, An Albatross, Nausea, Yo La Tengo, Christian Marclay, Swans, Mark Eitzel, Shudder To Think, The Dentists, Unrest, Borbetomagus, Gumball, among many others. To date he has produced and recorded over 200 records, including Helmet's Meantime, for which he received a gold record in 1993.

He is also known as a percussionist and drummer for Theoretical Girls, Laurie Anderson, Rhys Chatham’s ensemble, Glenn Branca's ensemble, and his own Wharton Tiers Ensemble.

Tiers started two groups which played his own compositions: A Band, which disbanded in 1980, and Glorious Strangers, which released a self-titled LP in 1984. Since then he has continued to compose and write many different styles of music, including solo piano, synth based instrumentals, opera, and symphonic works.

A CD of instrumentals for massed guitars by the Wharton Tiers Ensemble, Brighter Than Life, came out in April 1996, and the follow-up, Twilight Of The Computer Age, was released at the end of 1999. A new Ensemble LP, Freedom Now!, was released in March 2013 on Fun City NYC, a new record label founded by Tiers to release his music. This was followed by A Transendance in June 2014.

== Personal discography ==
- 1978. Theoretical Girls – You Got Me / U.S. Millie, 7", Theoretical Records, 1978.
- 1979. A Band – Lowly Worm, 7", Nancy Records, 1979.
- 1980. Glorious Strangers – Why Don't You Join The Army / Media Media, 7", Theoretical Records, 1980.
- 1983. Glorious Strangers – Untitled, Lp, Fun City Records, 1983.
- 1996. Wharton Tiers – Brighter Than Life, CD, 1996, Atavistic records.
- 1996. Glenn Branca – Songs '77-'79, CD, 1996, Atavistic records. 6 songs among 8 from Theoretical Girls.
- 1999. Wharton Tiers Ensemble, The – Twilight Of The Computer Age, CD, Atavistic records, 1999.
- 2002. Theoretical Girls – Theoretical Record, CD, Acute Records, 2002. Anthology of (mostly) unreleased material from the No Wave years.
- 2013. Wharton Tiers Ensemble - Freedom Now!, Digital, Fun City NYC, 2013
- 2013. Wharton Tiers - Mayan Nocturnes, Digital, Fun City NYC, 2013
- 2013. Superduperlooper - Superduperlooper, Digital, Fun City NYC, 2013
- 2013. Aurora.23 - Flash In The Universe, Digital, Fun City NYC, 2013
- 2014. Wharton Tiers Ensemble - A Transendance, Digital, Fun City NYC, 2014
- 2016. Wharton Tiers - Political Sonatas, Digital, Fun City NYC, 2016

== Bibliography ==
- Thurston Moore, Byron Coley, No Wave - Post-punk. Underground. New York. 1976-1980., Abrams Image, New York, 2008, 143 p., (ISBN 978-0-8109-9543-7)
