= Mark Robinson (musician) =

- Born: 21 February 1967 (age 59); Mineola, New York, U.S.
- Origin: Washington, D.C.
- Genres: Indie rock, post-punk, indie pop, noise pop, post-hardcore, ambient, experimental
- Occupations: Musician, producer, designer
- Instruments: Guitar, vocals, piano, drums
- Years active: 1982–present
- Labels: TeenBeat, 4AD, Tomlab, K, Homestead, Matador, Sub Pop, Simple Machines, Reprise, Leaf, Leopard Gecko
- Website: mmarkk.com

Mark Richard Robinson (born 21 February 1967) is an American indie rock musician from Washington, D.C. who founded TeenBeat Records in 1984. Best known for founding Unrest (with Phil Krauth), he has also been a member of Air Miami, Flin Flon, Grenadine, and currently plays with his wife Evelyn Hurley (Blast Off Country Style) in Cotton Candy. He has released a number of solo records. His recordings are typically sparse, often featuring a carefully controlled guitar. He first became a DJ at the student-run radio station WMUC while at the University of Maryland. He lives in Cambridge, Massachusetts.

His song "Catalog & Classify" from the album Tiger Banana has been used frequently on the radio program This American Life.

In March 2021, Robinson was featured in the debut episode of the podcast OK at Conversations, the theme music for which is his band Flin Flon's song "Swift Current".

== Solo discography ==
- 1987 Black Christmas (teenbeat 17)
- 1988 KingXMas (teenbeat 27)
- 1989 Sammy Supreme My Man (teenbeat 37)
- 1990 Mark E Superstar (teenbeat 57)
- 1996 Olympic Death Squad (teenbeat 200)
- 2000 Taste EP (EM series) (teenbeat 302)
- 2000 Tiger Banana (teenbeat 307)
- 2001 Canada's Green Highway (teenbeat 297)
- 2004 Origami & Urbanism (teenbeat 317)
- 2004 Babe Rainbow (tomlab tom36)
