= Ernest Jenning =

US record label

Ernest Jenning Record Co.
- Founded: 2002
- Founder: Pete D'Angelo, Gandhar Savur
- Distributor: The Orchard
- Genre: Indie rock, punk rock, experimental, hip hop
- Country of origin: United States
- Location: Brooklyn, New York
- Official website: ernestjenning.com

Ernest Jenning / Ernest Jenning Record Co. is an independent record label.

It was established by Pete D'Angelo and Gandhar Savur in 2002 in Jersey City, New Jersey and has been based out of Brooklyn, NY since 2003.

EJRC has released music from artists including Weezer, Parts & Labor, Versus, Built to Spill, O'Death, Wild Yaks, Bomb the Music Industry!, The Rentals, Savak, Takka Takka, Title Tracks, Nonconnah, The Black Hollies, Dälek, Saturday Looks Good to Me, Chris Mills and many more

From 2015 to 2025, the label also ran the artist imprint – Khannibalism – overseen by Berlin-based soul/garage artist King Khan.

== Discography ==
- ERJC240 Oneida - I Can't Stand You (single) b/w Steel
- ERJC239 The Taxpayers - Split Flexi 7"
- ERJC238 Parts & Labor - Set of All Sets
- ERJC236 Weezer - 1192
- ERJC235 Bach Artillerie - Bach Artillerie
- ERJC233 Pigeon Pit - Leash Aggression
- ERJC232 Carla J. Easton - I Think That I Might Love You
- ERJC230 Aitis Band - IV
- ERJC229 Perennial - "A" Is for Abstract: The Complete Art History
- ERJC228 Foot Ox - A Lighthouse with Silver Dog Eyes
- ERJC227 Animal, Surrender! - A Boot for Every Bane
- EJRC226 Rye Coalition - Paid in Full
- EJRC225 Perennial - Perennial '65
- EJRC224 SAVAK - SQUAWK!
- EJRC223 Martha's Vineyard - Ferries Decorations/Context
- EJRC222 Pigeon Pit - Crazy Arms
- EJRC221 The Taxpayers - Circle Breaker
- EJRC220 SAVAK - Child's Pose b/w Talk to Some People
- EJRC219 Miranda & The Beat - Can't Take It
- EJRC218 Pigeon Pit - Tour Tape 2024
- EJRC217 Animal, Surrender! - Animal, Surrender!
- EJRC216 Perennial - Art History
- EJRC215 Perennial - Lemon On Plastic
- EJRC214 SAVAK - Flavors of Paradise
- EJRC213 Trummors - 5
- EJRC212 +/- {Plus/Minus} - Further Afield
- EJRC211 PAWS - PAWS
- EJRC210 Worriers - Trust Your Gut
- EJRC209 King Khan - The Invaders: Original Score
- EJRC208 Scoville Unit - See What Can Be
- EJRC207 Miranda & The Beat - S/T
- EJRC206 Pigeon Pit - Treehouse
- EJRC205 +/- {Plus/Minus} - X's On Your Eyes
- EJRC204 +/- {Plus/Minus} - Let's Build A Fire
- EJRC203 The Van Pelt - Sultans Demo
- EJRC202 The Van Pelt - 1994 Demo
- EJRC201 Worriers - Warm Blanket
- EJRC200 Wild Yaks - Monumental Deeds
- EJRC199 King Khan - The Nature Of Things
- EJRC198 The Van Pelt - Sultans Of Sentiment
- EJRC197 The Van Pelt - Stealing From Our Favorite Thieves
- EJRC196 Poster Paints - Blood Orange EP
- EJRC195 Pigeon Pit - Feather River Canyon Blues
- EJRC194 Poster Paints - S/T
- EJRC193 Beauty Pill - Blue Period
- EJRC192 The Most Distant Object - S/T
- EJRC191 Nonconnah - Don't Go Down To Lonesome Holler
- EJRC190 Vitreous Humor - EP/Fireside Live
- EJRC189 Linqua Franqua - Bellringer
- EJRC188 Blunt Bangs - Everything Flows
- EJRC187 Nonconnah - EXHUMED SONIC SPECTRES, 2017–2020
- EJRC186 Blunt Bangs - Proper Smoker
- EJRC185 Mary Simich - How Does One Begin
- EJRC184 Boise Cover Band - Unoriginal Artists
- EJRC183 Martha's Vineyard Ferries - Suns Out Guns Out
- EJRC182 Vitreous Humor - Posthumous
- EJRC181 SAVAK - Human Error/Human Delight
- EJRC180 Nonconnah - Songs For And About Ghosts
- EJRC179 King Khan - The Infinite Ones
- EJRC178 Wild Yaks - Live at Rippers
- EJRC177 Flower - None Is (But Once Was) *
- EJRC176 Savak – Rotting Teeth in the Horse's Mouth
- EJRC175 El Sécondhand - All The Lonely People
- EJRC174 El Sécondhand - Blood and Aphorisms
- EJRC173 Millions Lands - The Ochre World
- EJRC172/KK013 King Khan / The Sadies – The Most Despicable Man Alive b/w Old Gunga Din 7-inch
- EJRC171 Je Suis France – Touch of Greg
- EJRC170 Je Suis France – Back to the Basics of Love
- EJRC169 King Khan No. 4 Blue Film Woman Soundtrack
- EJCR168 Trummors Dropout City
- EJRC167 Built to Spill Plays the Songs of Daniel Johnston
- EJRC166 We Vs. The Shark - Goodbye Guitar
- EJRC165 Blood Warrior – Animal Hides
- EJRC164 Savak – Mirror Maker EP
- EJRC163 Scoville Unit – S/T
- EJRC162/KK012 Saba Lou – Novum Ovum
- EJRC161 Flower – Tour Flexi – Names b/w Talk
- EJRC160 Drew Isleib The Cabin Sessions
- EJRC159 Versus – Ex Voto
- EJRC158 +/- {Plus/Minus} – Summer 2019 – EP
- EJRC157 Versus – Ex Nihilo EP
- EJRC156 Nonconnah – Seek Not Your Fortune
- EJRC155 Nonconnah – Dead Roses, Digged Up Zombies, Broken Pieces of Diamonds, Live Cats
- EJRC154/KK010 The King Khan Experience – Turkey Ride
- EJRC153 PAWS – Your Church on My Bonfire
- EJRC152/KK009 King Khan and the Shrines – Three Hairs and You're Mine
- EJRC151 Kudzu Wish – Kudzu Wish
- EJRC150 Savak – Beg Your Pardon
- EJRC149 Jäh Division - Dub Will Tear Us Apart... Again
- EJRC148/KK008 The Black Lips & The Khan Family
- EJRC147 Wild Yaks - Great Admirer
- EJRC146 Sunshine and the Rain – Beneath the Stars
- EJRC145 High Disciple – High Disciple
- EJRC144 Grandchildren - S/T
- EJRC143 Smart Went Crazy – CON ART (20th Anniversary Reissue)
- EJRC142 Savak – Cut-Ups
- EJRC141 Joel Michael Howard – 5th Grade Part B
- EJRC140/KK007 King Khan – Murderburgers
- EJRC139 Double Ferrari – Double Ferrari
- EJRC138 Sunshine and the Rain – In the Darkness of My Night
- EJRC137 Hunter Simpson – Goldmine
- EJRC136 Trummors – Headlands
- EJRC135 Las Rosas – Everyone Gets Exactly What They Want
- EJRC134 Saint Pé – Fixed Focus
- EJRC133 Doc Hopper – ...Ask Your Mom
- EJRC132 Doc Hopper – Aloha
- EJRC131/KK006 Saba Lou – Planet Enigma
- EJRC130 Joel Michael Howard – I Feel Nauseous
- EJRC129 Title Tracks – Long Dream
- EJRC128/KK005 King Khan – America Goddamn
- EJRC127 Exit Verse – Grant No Glory
- EJRC126/KK004 King Khan – Never Hold On
- EJRC125 unassigned
- EJRC124 North Collins – North Collins
- EJRC123 Sunshine and the Rain – Can't Stop Thinking About You b/w Pale Blue Skies
- EJRC122/KK003 William S. Burroughs – Let Me Hang You
- EJRC121 Still Flyin' – Perfect Future
- EJRC120/KK002 King Khan feat. Ian Svenonius – Hurtin' Class
- EJRC119/KK001 King Khan feat. Natalia Avelon - Bandit Queen
- EJRC118 The Everymen – These Mad Dogs Need Heroes
- EJRC117 The Everymen – Under the Covers with the Everyme
- EJRC116 Dead Gaze – Easy Travels
- EJRC115 Joel Michael Howard – Love as First Response
- EJRC114 Miniboone – Bad Sports
- EJRC113 Wild Yaks – Rejoice! God Loves Wild Yaks
- EJRC112 The Everymen – Givin' Up on Free Jazz
- EJRC111 Grandchildren – Zuni
- EJRC110 Daytona – Daytona
- EJRC109 Dinosaur Feathers – Control
- EJRC108 Exit Verse – Exit Verse
- EJRC107 Clawman – Tillson Tapes
- EJRC106 Trummors – Moorish Highway
- EJRC105 Super Lonely – Attachments
- EJRC104 Jeff Rosenstock – Summer Seven Club
- EJRC103 Grandchildren – Golden Age
- EJRC102 The Albertans – Dangerous Anything
- EJRC101 Miniboone – Miniboone
- EJRC100 The Black Hollies – Somewhere Between Here and Nowhere
- EJRC099 Shannon Wright – In Film Sound
- EJRC098 Action Beat + G.W. Sok – A Remarkable Machine
- EJRC097 Risk Relay – After Fake End Times
- EJRC096 Wild Yaks – Million Years
- EJRC095 Philip Glass – ReWork
- EJRC094 Shannon Wright – Secret Blood
- EJRC093 Still Flyin – On A Bedroom Wall
- EJRC092 Still Flyin – Travelin' Man 7-inch
- EJRC091 The Albertans – The Hunter 7-inch
- EJRC090 Trummors – Over and Around the Clove
- EJRC089 Drew Isleib – Stride
- EJRC088 Fred Thomas – Kuma
- EJRC087 Nouvellas – Never Go Home
- EJRC086 Bomb the Music Industry! – Vacation
- EJRC085 Takka Takka – A.M Landscapes
- EJRC084 The Rentals – Present "Resilience"
- EJRC083 Gabriel & The Hounds – Kiss Full of Teeth
- EJRC082 Dinosaur Feathers – Whistle Tips
- EJRC081 O'Death – Outside
- EJRC080 La Strada – In Motion
- EJRC079 Title Tracks – In Blank
- EJRC078 Lifeguards – Waving at the Astronauts
- EJRC077 Adam Thorn & The Top Buttons – Adam Thorn & The Top Buttons CD
- EJRC076 The Forms – Derealization CD
- EJRC075 Lifeguards – Product Head 7-inch
- EJRC074 Chris Mills – Heavy Years
- EJRC073 Quinn Marston – Can You Hear Me See Me Now?
- EJRC072 Charles Burst – Neighbor Song b/w Idiot Song 7-inch
- EJRC071 Still Flyin' – Neu Ideas CD
- EJRC070 Still Flyin' – Victory Walker 7-inch
- EJRC069 Still Flyin' – A Party in Motion EP
- EJRC068 Still Flyin' – Runaway Train II
- EJRC067 The Albertans – New Age
- EJRC066 Charles Burst – The Famous Patient
- EJRC065 La Strada – New Home
- EJRC064 Kudrow – Lando 7-inch
- EJRC063 Blood Warrior – Blood Warrior
- EJRC062 Title Tracks – It Was Easy
- EJRC061 Houston McCoy – No Art Vol.1 7-inch
- EJRC060 Wild Yaks – 10 Ships (Don't Die Yet!)
- EJRC059 Miss TK & The Revenge – The Ocean Likes to Party Too
- EJRC058 Blood Warrior – Darling Eyes 7-inch
- EJRC057 Cuff The Duke – Way Down Here
- EJRC056 The Black Hollies – Softly Towards the Light
- EJRC055 Miss TK & The Revenge – No Biterz EP
- EJRC054 Pegasuses-XL – Psychic Entourage
- EJRC053 Nouvellas – Nouvellas
- EJRC052 The Albertans – Legends of Sam Marco CD
- EJRC051 Skeletonbreath – Eagle's Next, Devil's Cave CD
- EJRC050 Dalek – Gutter Tactics 2xLP
- EJRC049 La Strada – EP
- EJRC048 Still Flyin' – Never Gonna Touch the Ground
- EJRC047 Skeletonbreath – Louise
- EJRC046 Pegasuses-XL – Electro Agitators
- EJRC045 The Measure (sa) / Flamingo 50 – split 7-inch
- EJRC044 Saturday Looks Good To Me – Springtime Judgment
- EJRC043 Charles Burst – Come Home and Feast
- EJRC042 Nouvellas – Satisfied b/w Right Kind of Woman
- EJRC041 The Albertans – Sex with an Angel EP
- EJRC040 Takka Takka – Migration
- EJRC039 Scoville Unit - Before It All Began
- EJRC038 Chris Mills – Atom Smashers
- EJRC037 Pegasuses-XL – The Antiphon
- EJRC036 The Black Hollies – Casting Shadows
- EJRC035 O'Death – Low Tide b/w I Think I'm Fine
- EJRC034 Takka Takka – We Feel Safer at Night
- EJRC033 Risk Relay – Curses Sing
- EJRC032 O'Death – Head Home
- EJRC031 Dälek – Abandoned Language
- EJRC030 Fizzle Like a Flood - The Love LP
- EJRC029 The Black Hollies / The Dansettes – Hush b/w Forty Days
- EJRC028 Adam Thorn & The Top Buttons – Where's the Freedom?
- EJRC027 Saturday Looks Good To Me – Money in the Afterlife
- EJRC026 Health – Where You From
- EJRC025 Houston McCoy – The Pegasus
- EJRC024 Scoville Unit – Closed Universe
- EJRC023 The Black Hollies – Crimson Reflections
- EJRC022 Drew Isleib – Landing
- EJRC021 The Occasion – Cannery Hours LP
- EJRC020 The Black Hollies – Tell Me What You Want
- EJRC019 Flamingo 50 – Tear It Up
- EJRC018 Chris Mills – The Wall to Wall Sessions
- EJRC017 Fizzle Like a Flood – Golden Sand and the Grandstand
- EJRC016 Heston Rifle – At the Time of Accident...
- EJRC015 Kudzu Wish – En Route
- EJRC014 Drew Isleib – The Build
- EJRC013 Taxpayer – I'll Do My Best to Stay Healthy
- EJRC012 Houston McCoy – self-titled
- EJRC011 Fizzle Like A Flood – self-titled EP
- EJRC010 Scoville Unit – Everybody Knows
- EJRC009 Denise Hradecky – Invisible Thread
- EJRC008 Kudzu Wish – Reverse Hurricane
- EJRC007 Disband – In Small Rooms
- EJRC006 Risk Relay – Low Frequency Listener
- EJRC005 Fizzle Like A Flood – Flash Paper Queen (The 4-Track Demos)
- EJRC004 Disband / Kudzu Wish – At ahe Scene of the Accident
- EJRC003 Drew Isleib – Sounds Through the Wall
- EJRC002 El Sécondhand – Crack and Divide
- EJRC001 The Quick Fix (Kills) – Novel Weapons
