= We Are Not a Glum Lot =

American indie rock band

- Origin: Colorado Springs, Colorado, U.S.
- Genres: Indie rock, math rock, jazz
- Years active: 2008–present
- Members: Sam Erickson; Zac Blum; Colin Foxwell; John Carey

We Are Not a Glum Lot is an American indie rock group based in Colorado Springs, Colorado. Their lineup consists of Sam Erickson (main vocals/guitar), Zac Blum (backup vocals/bass), Colin Foxwell (violin/guitar), and John Carey (percussion).

== Background ==
The group was established in Colorado Springs, Colorado in 2008. The band's name is a reference to a line from The Big Book, the foundation of the Alcoholics Anonymous program.

We Are Not a Glum Lot's sound has been described as "jazzed-up indie-pop/math-rock, with a more palatable vocal theory that just screams out '80s art/punk/wave". Unlike most indie rock groups, the band utilizes a violin, played by Colin Foxwell, ran through an amplifier and occasionally drenched in pedal effects to give their style a unique twist. While the band is still of high school age, they have been regarded as an important staple in their local music scene. Bill Forman of the Colorado Springs Independent referred to the group as "High School Prodigies". The band has performed with Tim Kasher (frontman of Cursive), O'Death, AJJ, and David Bazan.

== Discography ==
=== EPs ===
- We Are Not a Glum Lot (2014)

=== Studio albums ===
- Atychia (2015)
- The Price of Simply Existing (2019)
