= Christopher Mills =

Christopher Mills or Chris Mills may refer to:

== Geography ==
- Christopher Mills, unincorporated community in Medford, New Jersey

== People ==
- Christopher Mills (director), Canadian filmmaker
- Chris Mills (basketball), American basketball player
- Chris Mills (musician)
- Christopher Mills, 3rd Viscount Mills
- Chris Mills (speedway rider) (born 1983), British speedway rider
- Christopher Mills, video game character from Killer7
