= Flower (American band) =

American indie rock band

- Origin: New York City, U.S.
- Genre: Indie rock
- Years active: 1986–1990, 2019–present
- Labels: Simple Machines; Bear; Semaphore; Ernest Jenning Record Co.
- Members: Richard Baluyut; Ian James; Edward Baluyut; Andrew Bordwin
- Past members: Yosh Najita; Robert Hale; Fontaine Toups

Flower is a New York City indie rock band formed by guitarist Richard Baluyut (later of Versus and Whysall Lane), singer and bassist Ian James (later of Cell and French), drummer Rob Hale (also later of Versus), and keyboardist Yosh Najita (formerly of synth band Groan Box). Flower was originally active from 1986 to 1990. As of 2018, Flower had reunited for at least one show with Caithlin De Marrais of Rainer Maria and Pohgoh.

After recording the Crash EP with Kramer at Noise New York studios, Najita and Hale were replaced by Richard's brother Edward Baluyut (also later of Versus) on guitar and Andrew Bordwin on drums, and Richard began sharing lead vocal duties.

Their final album Hologram Sky was not released domestically in the US, and Ian James was briefly replaced by Fontaine Toups before the band dissolved in 1990. Following the renewed interest in the band generated by the success of Toups and the Baluyuts in Versus, high-profile indie label Simple Machines compiled all the band's recordings (except Crash) into Concrete Sky in 1994, and the group reunited for some promotional shows.

In 2019, the group reunited, recorded their first new album in 29 years (with Ernest Jenning Record Co.), and toured the west coast opening for Sebadoh.

In 2020, the group recorded None Is (But Once Was) (again with Ernest Jenning Record Co.), which was published on July 24.

== Discography ==
- Crash 12-inch EP (1986 on B Records)
- Concrete LP (1988 on Bear Label)
- Hologram Sky LP and CD (1990 on Bear Label thru Semaphore in Germany)
- Concrete Sky CD, a compilation of Flower's recorded works. (1994 on Bear and Simple Machines); reissued as name-your-price Digital album on Bandcamp
- Names b/w Talk Flexi Disc (2019 Ernest Jenning Record Co.)
- None Is (But Once Was) LP (2020 Ernest Jenning Record Co.)
