= Outside (O'Death album) =

Studio album by O'Death
- Released: April 19, 2011
- Length: 37:32
- Label: Ernest Jenning Recording Co.
- Producers: O'Death; Billy Pavone

O'Death chronology
Underwater Nightmare (2009)	Outside (2011)	Out of Hands We Go (2014)

Professional ratings
Aggregate scores
Source	Rating
Metacritic	71/100
Review scores
Source	Rating
Paste	(4.9/10)
Pitchfork Media	(7.9/10)
Pop Matters	7/10 stars
Drowned in Sound	7/10 stars

Outside is the fourth album by gothic country band O'Death.

== Track listing ==
All tracks are written by O'Death.

No.	Title	Length
1.	"Bugs"	2:12
2.	"Ghost Head"	3:34
3.	"Alamar"	3:52
4.	"Black Dress"	3:37
5.	"Ourselves"	3:54
6.	"Look at the Sun" (Featuring Sarah Balliet)	3:43
7.	"Howling Through"	3:11
8.	"Don't Come Back"	2:06
9.	"Pushing Out"	3:19
10.	"Back of the Garden"	3:11
11.	"The Lake Departed"	4:53
Total length:		37:32

== Personnel ==
- Greg Jamie – vocals, guitar
- Gabe Darling – backing vocals, ukulele, guitar, banjo
- David Rogers-Berry – drums, whoop
- Bob Pycior – fiddle, guitar
- Jesse Newman – bass
- Dan Sager – euphonium
- Sarah Balliet – cello on "Look at the Sun"
