= The Black Hollies =

American garage rock band

- Origin: Jersey City, New Jersey, United States
- Genres: Garage rock, Garage rock revival, Psychedelic rock, Neo-psychedelia
- Years active: 2005–present
- Label: Ernest Jenning
- Members: Justin Angelo Morey; Ashley Anderson Morey; Herbert Joseph Wiley V Jon Gonnelli; Nick Ferrante
- Past members: Scott Bolasci

The Black Hollies are an American garage rock band from Jersey City, New Jersey. The Black Hollies were founded in 2005 by three members of the band Rye Coalition.

== History ==
Part of the impetus behind the formation of the group was contractual difficulties Rye Coalition was having with labels. Ernest Jenning released the group's first 45 rpm record, "Tell Me What You Want" in late 2005 shortly after the band completed the recording for their first full-length. The band played their first SXSW show in March 2006. Their debut album, Crimson Reflections, was released shortly after on April 18, 2006. The band then embarked on a mini-tour of the East Coast with longtime friend Neil McAneny, serving as tour manager and security guard. The group continued to play throughout the metropolitan area constantly and managed to support; Joan Jett, Blue Cheer, Detroit Cobras, The Greenhornes and Ted Leo and the Pharmacists. In late 2006, Justin Angelo Morey joined friends, The Dansettes on bass and continued playing in both groups until the Summer of 2007 when the Dansettes disbanded. The Black Hollies began recording demos recorded on a boom box while rehearsing in Journal Square section of Jersey City.In January 2007, guitarist Jon Gonnelli relocated to Los Angeles. Local shows around this period were performed as a trio. Andy Pierce, drummer for The Dansettes filled in on drums for the band's 2007 SXSW performance. Justin Angelo Morey introduced his home made 4-track demos to Wiley and Bolasci. With childhood friend Mike Olear behind the mobile recording console, basic rhythm tracks were recorded throughout the Winter at Scott Bolasci's house. Gonnelli flew back from Los Angeles to record his tracks. On Sunday May 27, 2007, the final mixes for Casting Shadows were completed at Dead Verse Studio in Union City, NJ. Around this time a split 45 rpm from The Black Hollies and The Dansettes was released on Ernest Jenning. The split contains a cover version of Joe South's "Hush" which features members of The Dansettes. In June 2007, drummer and founding member Scott Bolasci departed on good terms with the group and to this day still remains extremely close with all current members. Nicholas Ferrante replaced Scott Bolasci and Gonnelli moved back to New Jersey to pursue The Black Hollies full-time. In August 2007, Justin Angelo Morey joined the Nouvellas( Contains former members of The Dansettes. Justin Angelo remained a member until May 2008). At the beginning of 2008 The Black Hollies toured the United States and returned to Austin, TX for SXSW. Their follow up LP, Casting Shadows was officially released on March 11, 2008. The band would spend the majority of 2008 on the road throughout North America.

Softly Towards the Light was released in October 2009.

"Somewhere Between Here and Nowhere" was released in October 2013

== Members ==
Current

- Justin Angelo Morey – lead vocals, guitar, synthesizer, stylophone, harmonica, bass,
- Ashley Anderson Morey – electric fuzz bass, back up vocals
- Jon Gonnelli – keyboards, guitar, lead vocals on, "Eyes of Mermaide"
- Herb Wiley – guitar, electric sitar, back-up vocals
- Nick Ferrante – drums, percussion

Former

- Scott Bolasci – drums

== Discography ==
=== Albums ===
- Crimson Reflections (Ernest Jenning, 2006)
- Casting Shadows (Ernest Jenning, 2008)
- Softly Towards the Light (Ernest Jenning, 2009)
- Somewhere Between Here And Nowhere (Ernest Jenning, 2013)

=== Singles ===
- "Tell Me What You Want" b/w "Tired Of Being Lonely" (Ernest Jenning 2005)
- "Paisley Pattern Ground" b/w "Hold Tight(Go Out Of Your Mind)" (Dead Flowers 2008)
- "Gloomy Monday Morning" b/w "Heart Of The Country"(Safety Meeting 2009)
- "Benevolent Beacon" b/w "Toy Boat Toy Boat Toy Boat" (Claw & Globe 2011)

=== Split releases ===
The Black Hollies/Dansettes split 45: "Hush" b/w "Forty Days"(Ernest Jenning 2007)

=== Compilation albums ===
The Black Hollies contributed their version of Paul McCartney's classic, "Heart Of The Country" on Tom Scharpling's Best Show on WFMU's Ram tribute album.

== Television and film placements ==
Their debut single "Tell Me What You Want" was placed in a Dell computer advertisement in 2008.

Some other song placements:
"Can't Stop These Tears (From Falling)" – Vampire Diaries
"Everything's Fine" – Trauma
"Paisley Pattern Ground" – Ugly Betty
"Tell Me What You Want" – Rescue Me
"Paisley Pattern Ground" – Reaper
"That Little Girl" – Around
"Gloomy Monday Morning", "Running Through My Mind", "Paisley Pattern Ground" – The Virginity Hit
"Paisley Pattern Ground", "That Little Girl" – Greek
"Paisley Pattern Ground" – IBM
"Tell Me What You Want" – Dell
"Paisely Pattern Ground" – Burton Snowboards "The Liftline"
"Running Through My Mind" – IBM / Harley Davidson
"Eyes of Mermaide" – Californication
