= The Taxpayers =

DIY Punk Band

- Origin: Portland, Oregon
- Genres: Folk punk, punk rock
- Years active: 2007-present
- Members: Rob Taxpayer; Noah Taxpayer; Elise Taxpayer; Beni Taxpayer; Alex Taxpayer; Kevin Taxpayer; Andrew Taxpayer
- Past members: Nasrene Taxpayer; Patch Taxpayer; Nate Taxpayer

The Taxpayers are an American punk rock band formed in 2007 in Portland, Oregon. The band is known for their DIY punk ethic and commitment to inclusivity. They have been noted for experimenting with different styles like folk punk, hardcore, and bluegrass in addition to writing narrative-based concept albums.

== Career ==
=== God, Forgive These Bastards (2012) ===
Their album God, Forgive These Bastards (2012) is a concept album that details the life of a fictional baseball player named Henry Turner. It was released alongside a novel of the same name written by Rob Taxpayer, the band's principal songwriter. The album has received critical acclaim. Since its release, the song "I Love You Like An Alcoholic" off the album received a large boost in streams due to its popularity on TikTok. The song currently has over 117 million streams on Spotify.

=== Recent activity ===
In 2018, a few of the members from The Taxpayers formed the band Trusty Snakes and released one country record called New American Frontier.

The Taxpayers headlined the 2024 edition of the volunteer-run folk-punk festival Hobofopo in Hobart, Australia alongside local bands like The Stragglers, Gusto Gusto, and Operation Ibis.

In 2025, they released their seventh studio album, Circle Breaker, on Ernest Jenning Record Co., after a long hiatus. It was recorded within the span of a week and touches upon themes of the angst of living through a national pandemic, nihilism, and weathering personal tragedies while practicing resilience.

== In popular culture ==
A live version of their 2007 song "Medicines" serves as the opening and closing theme for the long-running comedic medical podcast, Sawbones.

== Members ==
=== Current ===
- Rob Taxpayer - vocals, guitar, piano, clarinet
- Noah Taxpayer - percussion, backing vocals
- Elise Taxpayer - cello
- Beni Taxpayer - vocals, bass, tambourine
- Alex Taxpayer - saxophone, accordion
- Kevin Taxpayer - trumpet, piano
- Andrew Taxpayer - lead guitar, banjo

=== Former ===
- Nasrene Taxpayer - vocals, accordion, bass
- Patch Taxpayer - bass
- Nate Taxpayer - bass

When they perform live, the band fluctuates between three and eight members. Band members have chosen to adopt "Taxpayer" as a last name to keep themselves pseudonymous.

== Discography ==
=== Studio albums ===
- Exhilarating News (2007, Useless State Records)
- A Rhythm in The Cages (2009, Useless State Records, Quote Unquote Records, Secret Pennies Records, Rib Fest Records)
- To Risk So Much For One Damn Meal (2010, Plan-It-X Records, Quote Unquote Records, Useless State Records, Tiger Force Ultra Records, Rib Fest Records)
- God Forgive These Bastards (2012, Asian Man Records, Really Records, Plan-It-X Records, Useless State Records, Microcosm Publishing)
- Cold Hearted Town (2013, Plan-It-X Records, Useless State Records)
- Big Delusion Factory (2016, Secret Pennies Records, Useless State Records)
- Circle Breaker (2025, Ernest Jenning Record Co.)

=== Collections/EPs ===
- Modest Proposals (2011, Useless State Records)
- Modest Proposals 2 (2020, Useless State Records)

=== Compilations ===
- Dangerous Intersections VI (2009, Traffic Street Records)
- PDX Pop Now! (2009)
- Asian Man Music For Asian Man People Vol. 1 (2013, Asian Man Records)
