= Je Suis France =

- Origin: Athens, Georgia, United States
- Genres: Indie rock
- Years active: 1997-present
- Labels: Pitch-A-Tent Records, Orange Twin Records, Antenna Farm Records
- Members: Ryan Bergeron; DJ Hammond; Ryan Martin; Chris Rogers; Jeff Griggs; Sean Rawls; Jeremy Wheatley; Jon Croxton; Ken Henslee

Je Suis France is an American indie rock group formed in Athens, GA, in 1997. Their albums have been released by David Lowery's Pitch-A-Tent Records, Elf Power's Orange Twin Records, and Antenna Farm Records. The band has also self-released a number of singles and CD-Rs.

== History ==
Je Suis France was formed in Athens, GA, in 1997. Sean Rawls of Masters of the Hemisphere and Still Flyin' was the original drummer, but was eventually replaced by Jeff Griggs, also of Masters of the Hemisphere.

In 2000 Je Suis France released their self-titled debut album on Pitch-A-Tent Records. They played the CMJ festival that fall and the following year's SXSW festival.

2002's Ice Age EP received airplay on John Peel's BBC radio show. Byron Coley, writing in Wire Magazine, praised its "individual cool takes on hard-edged Prog-punk readymades". In 2003 they released Fantastic Area on Orange Twin Records, which ranked twentieth on Polish music website Porcys's list of the best records released between 2000 and 2009. Fantastic Area was followed by 2007's Afrikan Majik album. In 2017 NME voted them the worst band in Athens, GA history.

== Twilight Delirium ==
Between 2000 and 2009 Je Suis France oversaw the Twilight Delirium concert series. Twilight Delirium was an annual concert the night of the Twilight Criterium bicycle race. Dozens of bands played Twilight Delirium over the years, including Masters of the Hemisphere, Royal Bangs, and Summer Hymns.

== Discography ==
=== Albums ===
- Je Suis France (Pitch-A-Tent Records, 2000)
- Fantastic Area (Orange Twin Records, 2003)
- Afrikan Majik (Antenna Farm Records, 2007)
- Let's Give 'Em Something To Talk About (Nokahoma Records, 2011)
- Coleslaw III Drymouth (Diskette Records, LTD, 2013)
- By the Condo (Nokahoma Records, 2017)
- Back to the Basics of Love (Ernest Jenning, 2019)

=== Singles/E.P.s ===
- Ice Age 7" (dcBaltimore2012, 2002)
- Java Chats 7" (Nokahoma Records, 2005)
- Hot-Doggin' on a Flip-Flop (split 12" with Acid Mothers Temple) (Nokahoma Records, 2007)
- “Free Fog” b/w “Free Frog” 7” (Nokahoma Records, 2017

=== Compilations ===
- Kindercore Christmas
- Little Darla Has a Treat For You Vol. X
