= Luigi Waites =

American drummer

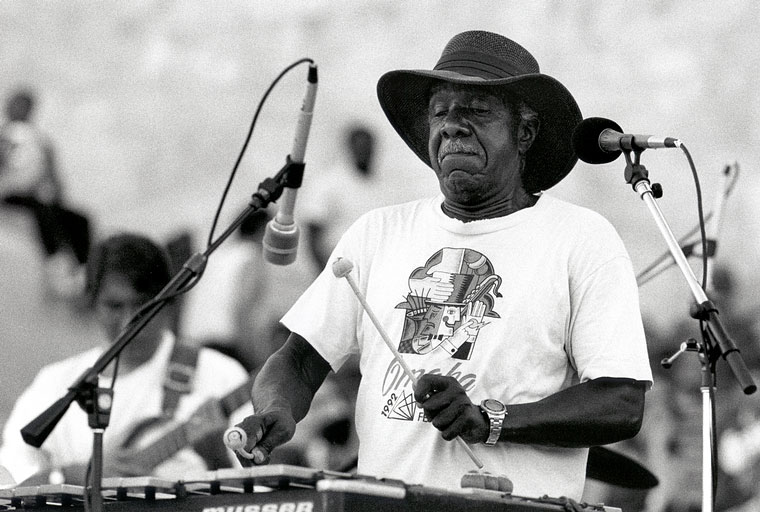

Background information
- Born: Lewis Waites; July 10, 1927; Omaha, Nebraska, U.S.
- Died: April 6, 2010 (aged 82) Omaha, Nebraska, U.S.
- Genres: Jazz
- Occupations: Musician, Jazz percussionist, vibraphonist, music instructor
- Years active: 1940–2010

Luigi Waites (born Lewis Waites; July 10, 1927 – April 6, 2010) was a jazz drummer and vibraphonist from Omaha, Nebraska. He performed weekly gigs in the Omaha area both solo and with ensembles such as Luigi, Inc. He served the Omaha music community for over 60 years. He toured Europe twice and performed with jazz legends such as Sarah Vaughan, Ella Fitzgerald and Dinah Washington. Luigi, Inc has shared the stage with Jean-Luc Ponty, James Brown and Dizzy Gillespie.

== Biography ==
Luigi Waites was born Lewis Waites on July 10, 1927, in Omaha, Nebraska, to Ione Kelley and Sylvester Waites. Waites began playing drums at age twelve, and soon after began playing local nightclubs around Omaha. At the time the two local musicians unions were segregated.

During his high school years, Waites regularly played in bars and clubs which sometimes affected his ability to get enough sleep on school nights. He might perform as a professional musician until the wee hours and then jump into a taxicab standing by in front of his mother's house to rush him to class at Central High School the next morning. This, to the chagrin of some of his instructors, since on a teacher's salary in that day most schoolteachers could not afford to take a cab to work each day. While Waites served in the U.S. Army during World War II at Camp Lee, Virginia, he met jazz drummer Elvin Jones. Luigi married Eva Jean Little in 1950 and begot six children.

In 1960, Waites founded The Contemporaries, a multicultural, independent drum corps that featured jazz rhythms, lyres and modern dance steps. Then, during the 1970s, Luigi Waites was a solo artist in The National School Tours program where he performed in classrooms and school assemblies. When leading his band, Luigi Inc, he performed on vibraharp rather than drums. Luigi Inc is a 5-piece jazz combo located in Omaha, Nebraska. Founded by Luigi Waites, Luigi Inc (short for including, not incorporated) has the distinct honor of maintaining one of the longest running gigs in the country. He appeared with the group over 1,700 consecutive Sunday nights in Omaha at the bar, Mr. Toad, beginning in 1978. During the 2000s, Waites collaborated with pop band Shelter Belt.

As a drummer, Luigi Waites was influenced by Buddy Rich, Joe Jones, Louie Bellson and Max Roach.

Waites died at 4 a.m. on April 6, 2010, at Immanuel Medical Center in Omaha, Nebraska of natural causes. He was 82 years old.

== Discography ==
- Fear Not (2001)
- Distant Relatives (2005)
- Live at Mr. Toad (2010)

== Awards ==
- 1996: Awarded Nebraska Artist of the Year by the Nebraska Arts Council.
- 2005: Inducted into the Omaha Black Music Hall of Fame
- 2007: Received the Lifetime Achievement Award at the first annual Omaha Entertainment Awards on January 4.

Omaha Press Club award
