= Pigeon Pit =

American folk punk band

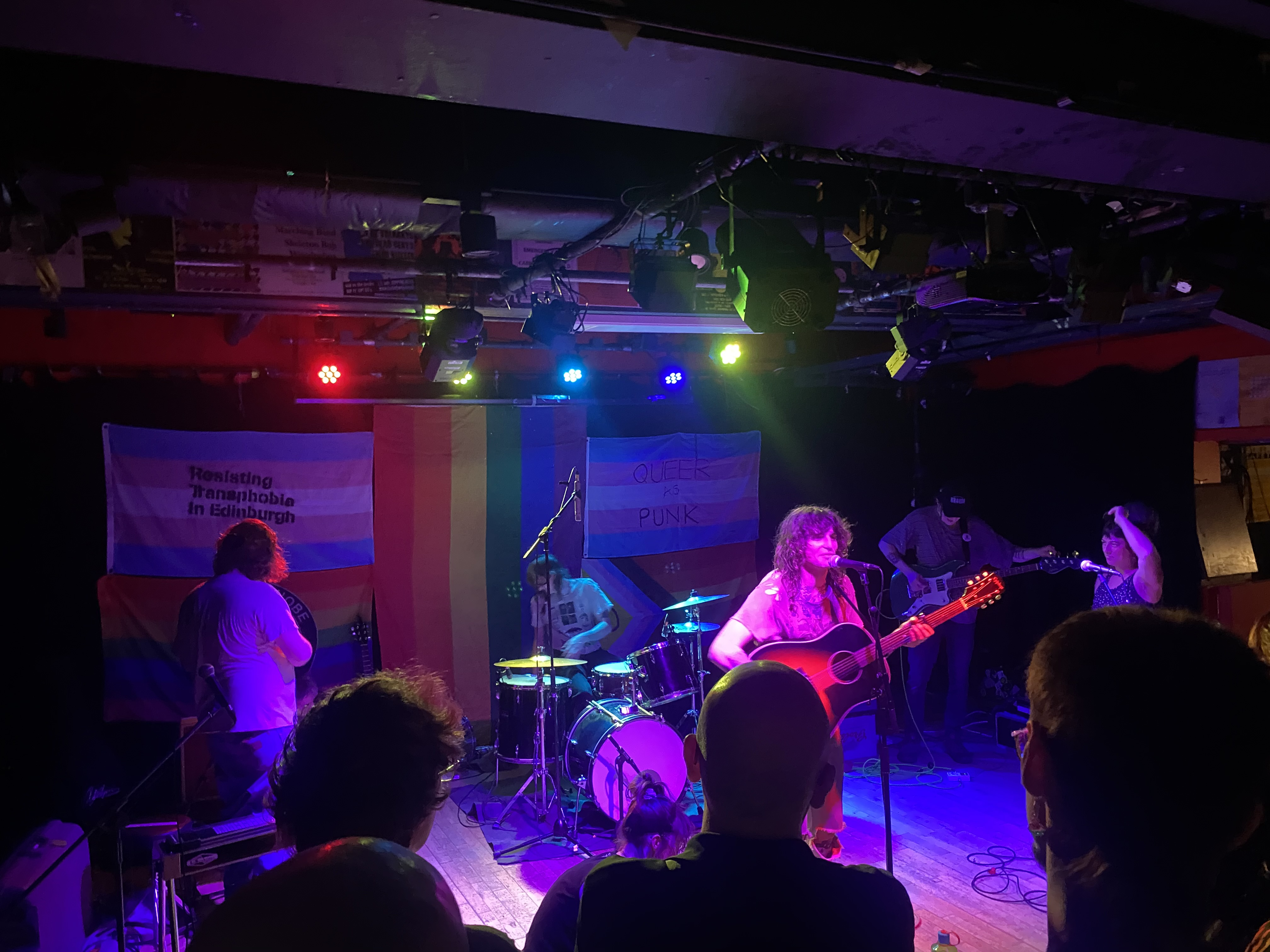
- Pigeon Pit playing in Edinburgh (September 2025)

Background information
- Origin: Olympia, Washington, U.S.
- Genres: Folk punk
- Years active: 2014–present
- Labels: Ernest Jenning Record Co.; Reach-Around Records; DistroKid
- Members: Lomes Oleander; Bo Lark; Mads Bun; Josh Hoey; Olive Hannah; Jim Rhian

Pigeon Pit is an American folk punk band from Olympia, Washington. The band started as a solo project of Lomes Oleander (lead vocals, guitar) in 2014, and now consists of Bo Lark (vocals, fiddle), Mads Bun (banjo), Josh Hoey (bass), Olive Hannah (drums), and Jim Rhian (pedal steel guitar), who joined later.

== History ==
=== Early days (2014–2020) ===
Pigeon Pit started as a solo project by lead singer Lomes Oleander out of Olympia Washington in 2014.

The name Pigeon Pit comes from Oleander's visualization of her own anxiety, "a giant hole in my chest [...] full of birds", as well as her personal affinity with pigeons.

=== COVID-19 and wider acclaim (2020–2023) ===
In 2020, the song Nights Like These off the 2015 album Shut in gained traction on TikTok, with Oleander saying "It got a lot of attention from people that had never seen me play before, which was cool". Also in 2020, the COVID-19 pandemic caused many people to be laid off, and to have more time to focus on the arts, leading to the five other band members joining.

After the release of their 2022 album Feather River Canyon Blues, they were invited to play a Tiny Desk Concert at NPR. NPR also put the song Milk Crates from the new album on their list of the 100 best songs of 2022. The same year, Brooklyn-based music publication BrooklynVegan put out a positive review of the album.

=== Tours and new albums (2023–present) ===
In 2023, Pigeon Pit went on an Australia and New Zealand tour, with fellow folk punk band Apes of the State, and in 2024, Pigeon Pit went on tour with Laura Jane Grace, and later the same year with AJJ.

Two albums were released in 2025, Crazy Arms and Leash Aggression, with the latter having been written quickly compared to their previous releases. The 10 song album was all written and recorded in a few months before being released in November.

In 2025 Pigeon Pit went on a tour of the UK and Ireland, with their stop at the Wee Red Bar reported on by The List, Scotland's largest guide to arts and entertainment.

== Musical style ==
Pigeon Pit is a folk punk band. The band records all their music in analog, on a 4-track tape recorder, with the whole band in the same room.

In BrooklynVegan's review of Feather River Canyon Blues, Andrew Sacher says:

With an irresistibly nasally voice, Lomes Oleander wraps defiant and devastating lyrics in comforting melodies, and the songs are fleshed out rustic harmonies, fiddle, banjo, pedal steel, and other appealing, Americana-tinged embellishments.

== Discography ==
Albums

- Feather River Canyon Blues (2022)
- Crazy Arms (2025)
- Leash Aggression (2025)

Live albums

- Tiny Desk Concert (2022), recorded as one of the Tiny Desk Concerts

EPs

- Shut in (2015)
- Treehouse (2017)
