= Broken Hymns, Limbs and Skin =

Studio album by O'Death
- Released: August 22, 2008
- Length: 39:04
- Label: Kemado Records
- Producer: O'Death; Alex Newport

O'Death chronology
Head Home (2007)	Broken Hymns, Limbs and Skin (2008)	Underwater Nightmare (2009)

Professional ratings
Review scores
Source	Rating
Slant	3/5 stars
Spin	7/10 stars
Pop Matters	8/10 stars
Drowned in Sound	7/10 stars

Broken Hymns, Limbs and Skin is the third album by gothic country band O'Death.

== Track listing ==
All tracks are written by O'Death.

No.	Title	Length
1.	"Low Tide"	2:21
2.	"Fire on Peshtigo"	2:47
3.	"Legs to Sin"	2:03
4.	"Mountain Shifts"	3:54
5.	"Vacant Moan"	4:10
6.	"A Light That Does Not Dim"	1:47
7.	"Grey Sun"	3:05
8.	"Home"	3:18
9.	"Leininger"	1:11
10.	"Crawl Through Snow"	2:52
11.	"Ratscars"	1:38
12.	"On an Aching Sea"	3:16
13.	"Angeline"	4:43
14.	"Lean-To"	1:52
Total length:		39:04

== Personnel ==
- Greg Jamie – vocals, guitar
- Gabe Darling – backing vocals, ukulele, guitar, banjo
- David Rogers-Berry – drums, whoop
- Bob Pycior – fiddle, guitar
- Jesse Newman – bass
- Dan Sager

== Notes ==
The track "Fire on Peshtigo" refers to the Peshtigo Fire of 1871.
