= Shelter Belt =

- Origin: Omaha, Nebraska
- Genres: Pop rock
- Years active: 2000s-present
- Label: (self-released)
- Website: beltcave.com

Shelter Belt is a pop band from Omaha, Nebraska who are eclectic in style and use a wide array of instruments. They are known to switch instruments during shows. They are also known for their DIY work ethic, handling all aspects of the band themselves. They record in their own studio, known as the Beltcave, and they book their own tours without the assistance of a record label or booking agent.

The band collectively cites Marvin Gaye, Gustavo Cerati, Tom Waits, Prince, Manu Chao, Willie Nelson and others as influences.

== History ==
Shelter Belt's first album, Nothing Makes Me Sad Ever, was released in 2000. In 2002 Shelter Belt was featured on the NE vs. NC compilation with Desaparecidos, The Good Life, Cursive, Fizzle Like A Flood, Sorry About Dresden and Neva Dinova.

In 2004, Shelter Belt released Rain Home. In 2006, the group released Under The World Awhile and performed a series of album release parties throughout the midwest. During a concert with Neva Dinova, drummer Anthony Knuppel drank a pitcher of beer as his "special dance".

Aside from their seven members, Shelter Belt also frequently use guest musicians to diversify their sound. The late Omaha jazz veteran Luigi Waites was amongst them and later joined the group, adding depth to their sound by way of vibraphone and marimba. Members Jesse J. Otto and Anthony Knuppel have also worked with Omaha artist Fizzle Like A Flood.

In 2007 Shelter Belt released the short film Extraordinary Leverage, which they collectively produced and scored. The soundtrack also includes Waites playing vibraphone.

Shelter Belt toured the Hawaiian Islands twice; once in 2007 and once in 2008.

Shelter Belt was invited to play both the 2006 and 2008 Missouri Valley History Conference. The recording of the 2008 performance at Joslyn Castle became their album Live at Joslyn Castle.

In 2009, Shelter Belt released Everyone Might Be A Senator, a rock opera based on a character who is obsessed with his fear of senators.

During the summer of 2010, Shelter Belt was featured on the music podcast Coverville for a show about rapper Eminem. Their instrumental cover of Dr. Dre's "Forgot About Dre" is also found on their 2010 all-covers recording, These Songs were not written by Shelter Belt. The cover album was again featured in a 2014 episode, praising Shelter Belt's rendition of Goodnight, Irene.

In December 2013, Shelter Belt released their first EP, I Can't Be Wrong Again, containing seven original songs from the sessions for their forthcoming albums.

On July 28, 2015, Shelter Belt released two new studio albums: Look At Your Hands, You've Got Explaining To Do, and Money In The Weeds.

After releasing a 28-song compilation of unreleased material entitled Outtakes in 2017, Shelter Belt announced a new album on October 14, 2022 entitled The Comforts of a Home You Were Forced to Build.

== Band members ==
- Jedediah Vondracek
- Nick Pribyl
- Rachel Hospodka
- Jesse J. Otto

== Past members ==
- Anthony Knuppel
- Chris Sorensen
- NLJ Klosterboer
- Chris Ageton
- Andrea Bloomquist (Bazoin)
- Luigi Waites

== Discography ==
=== Albums ===
- Nothing Makes Me Sad Ever (2000)
- Rain Home (2004)
- Under The World Awhile (2006)
- Music from the film Extraordinary Leverage (2007)
- Everyone Might Be A Senator (2009)
- These Songs were not written by Shelter Belt (2010)
- Look At Your Hands, You've Got Explaining To Do (2015)
- Money In The Weeds (2015)
- The Comforts of a Home You Were Forced to Build (2022)

=== EPs ===
- I Can't Be Wrong Again (2013)

=== Live albums ===
- Live at Joslyn Castle (2008)

=== Compilations ===
- NE vs. NC (2002 · Redemption Recording Co.)

song: "In Your Door"

- Outtakes (2017)
