= Kudzu Wish =

American indie rock band

- Origin: Greensboro, North Carolina
- Genres: Indie rock
- Years active: 1996–2005
- Labels: Ernest Jenning
- Past members: Adam Thorn; Devender Sellers; Eric Mann; Tim LaFollette; Geordie Woods:
- Website: Band Page on record label site

Kudzu Wish was a band formed in 1998 by Devender Sellars, Eric Mann, Tim LaFollette, and Geordie Woods after befriending each other while studying at Guilford College in Greensboro, North Carolina. Adam Thorn later joined the band in 2000. Depending on whom you ask, Kudzu Wish was an indie rock band, a punk rock band, a post-hardcore band, or an amalgamation of some or all of those genres. Perhaps guitarist Eric Mann defined the band most accurately:

"it means a rock band of 5 dudes, whose many music influences just happen to make sense together. In addition, it also means a lot more than music to me. It means community and friendship."

== At The Scene Of The Accident ==
Regardless of what the disparate parts of Kudzu Wish thought their band was, the music press, and underground rock fans, often didn't know what to make of the five-piece. Reviews of their 2002 debut, a split CD with Disband released on Ernest Jenning Records, often revealed the reviewer to be confused (and occasionally appalled) at a perceived lack of cohesiveness, and yet appreciative of the forcefulness of the songs. Ryan Potts at Skyscraper Magazine seemed let down by a band who couldn't finish what they started.

"Kudzu Wish spin rough rock edges around their sturdy melodic core to arrive at music that feels as if it’s simply going through the motions of a typical punk band rather than truly trailblazing its own path."

== Reverse Hurricane ==
When it came time for the band to release their first full-length album in 2003 it was apparent to most that a steady regime of touring had resulted in a tighter, more ferocious Kudzu Wish. Reverse Hurricane, was also released on Ernest Jenning and radio promotion was done for the album through Vitriol Independent Promotion. The album was a top 10 CMJ ADD and reached number 137 on the CMJ college radio charts. Many of the songs featured on the album would remain in the Kudzu Wish repertoire until the end. "I Am Robot", "We've Got Big Hands", and "Do You need An Anthem?" had audiences singing along to the lyrics as though they were written with a mob of voices in mind. More touring followed the release of Reverse Hurricane including a tour of the southeast with Army of Ponch, as well as a number of opening slots with the up-and-coming Against Me! In 2004 Kudzu Wish completed a five-week tour of the continental United States.

== En Route ==
The band's next step was to record an EP entitled En Route with respected producer J. Robbins. The album was released by Ernest Jenning on October 7, 2005, and was released post-humously as a 12" EP by Permaculture Records (now Red String Records). 2005 saw Kudzu wish touring up to Canada and back down to Florida with No Idea Records band, Fifth Hour Hero. 2005 also saw the final Kudzu wish show which took place at the Greene Street Club in Greensboro (A reunion concert was held at Two Art Chicks in 2007). In 2006 No Idea Records released the Fest3 DVD which featured a Kudzu Wish performance of their song "I Am Rocket," and Series DVD released First in Flight: A North Carolina Retrospective DVD which featured Kudzu Wish performing "Do You Need An Anthem?" live. An interview is conducted with Adam and Eric on the extras section of Against Me!'s "We're Never Going Home" DVD. Kudzu Wish also donated several curry recipes to I Like Food, Food Tastes Good a book that features recipes by rock bands and was published by Hyperion Books.

== Tim LaFollette and Often Awesome ==
Bass player Tim LaFollette was diagnosed with amyotrophic lateral sclerosis (ALS, or Lou Gehrig's disease) in April 2009. His friends started the Often Awesome Army, working to improve Tim's quality of life and create awareness about ALS. Tim's battle was featured in a web series called "Often Awesome: The Series." Tim died on the morning of August 23, 2011, surrounded by family and friends.

== Reunion ==
Kudzu Wish stopped playing together in August 2009, not long after Tim LaFollette's diagnosis. Almost 10 years later, Eric Mann discovered original studio files of some of the band's old material. While the remaining bandmates have no intention to record or release new material, they did decide to reunite to unveil some of the material live. Kudzu Wish performed to a sold-out crowd at The Crown at the Carolina Theatre of Greensboro, North Carolina on March 22, 2019.
