= Head Home =

Studio album by O'Death
- Released: July 12, 2007
- Length: 41:39
- Label: Ernest Jenning Record Co.
- Producer: O'Death; Billy Pavone

O'Death chronology
Carl Nemelka Family Photographs (2004)	Head Home (2007)	Broken Hymns, Limbs and Skin (2008)

Professional ratings
Review scores
Source	Rating
Spin	6/10 stars
Contact Music	8/10 stars
Pitchfork Media	(6.8/10)

Head Home is the second album and label debut from Brooklyn based gothic country band O'Death. The album was self-released in 2006, and remastered and re-released in 2007 when the band signed to the Ernest Jenning Record Co. label.

== Track listing ==
All tracks are written by O'Death.

No.	Title	Length
1.	"Down to Rest"	3:42
2.	"Adelita"	3:09
3.	"Allie Mae Reynolds"	2:48
4.	"The Crab Apple Switch"	0:48
5.	"O Lee O"	4:27
6.	"Busted Old Church"	2:32
7.	"Travelin' Man"	2:57
8.	"Face Mask"	1:02
9.	"Only Daughter"	5:00
10.	"Ground Stump"	3:40
11.	"Rickety Fence Teeth"	0:41
12.	"All the World"	2:17
13.	"Jesus Look Down"	4:36
14.	"Nathaniel"	4:30
15.	"Gas Can Row"	2:10
Total length:		41:39

== Personnel ==
- Greg Jamie – vocals, guitar
- Gabe Darling – ukulele, slide guitar, banjo, vocals
- David Rogers-Berry – drums, vocals
- Bob Pycior – fiddle, percussion
- Jesse Newman – bass, vocals, accordion
- Dan Sager – euphonium, percussion
