= Masters of the Hemisphere =

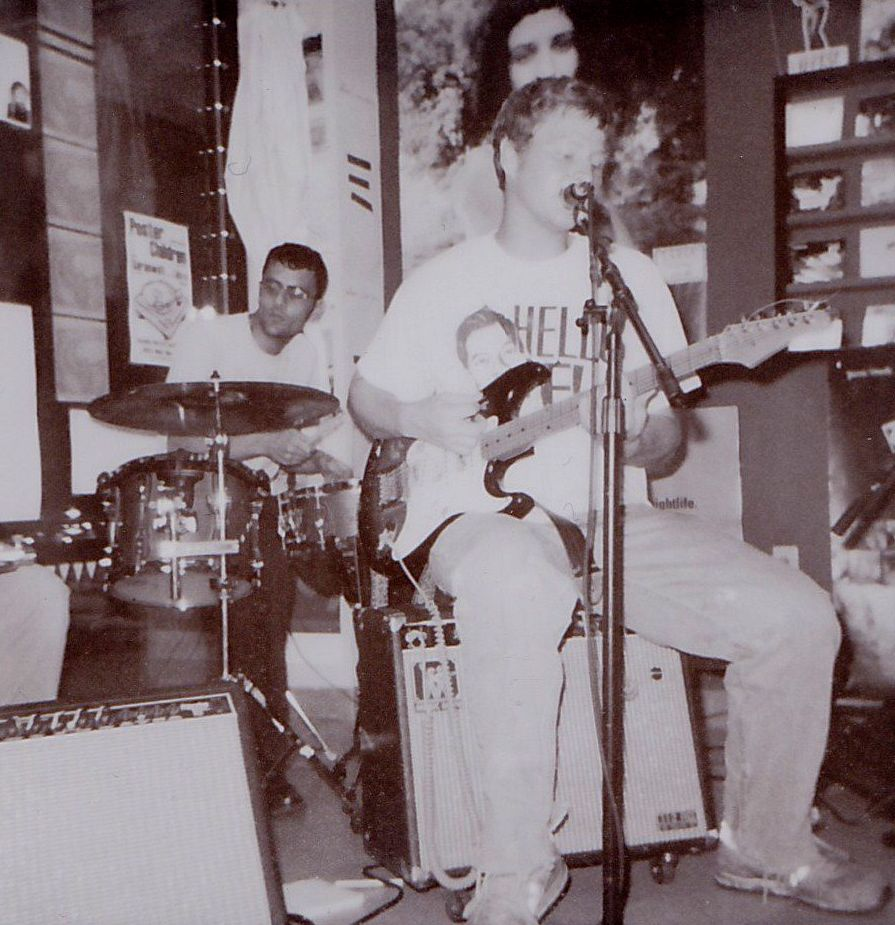
- Masters of the Hemisphere live in Indianapolis, Indiana, 2000

Background information
- Origin: Athens, Georgia, USA
- Genres: Indie pop
- Years active: 1996–2002, 2010-present
- Label: Kindercore Records
- Past members: Sean Rawls; Bren Mead; Adrian Finch; Ryan Lewis (1996); Jeff Griggs (1996–2002)

Masters of the Hemisphere are an American indie pop group, founded by Bren Mead and Sean Rawls. The two moved to Athens, Georgia, to attend college in 1996. There they met Ryan Lewis, co-founder of Kindercore Records, who played drums at the first Masters of the Hemisphere show. Jeff Griggs (also of The Mendoza Line) soon replaced Lewis. In 1997 Kindercore released their debut seven-inch ep, Going on a Trek to Iceland. The group then recorded their first full-length album, the eponymous Masters of the Hemisphere, which was released on Kindercore Records in 1998. The band soon expanded to a four-piece, adding multi-instrumentalist Adrian Finch. Several singles and compilation appearances followed, including a release on the Happy Happy Birthday To Me Records singles club, before the band released their second full length, the concept album I Am Not a Freemdoom, also on Kindercore. The record garnered mixed reviews, which in part was likely due to the album's rather complicated concept, regarding an island of reservoir-dwelling creatures being enslaved by an evil dog. The Permanent Stranger EP followed in 2002, on the dcBaltimore2012 label. The band split up after their next album, 2002's well received Protest a Dark Anniversary. A recording of their then-final show at Athens, Georgia's 40 Watt Club was later released as The Last Show Ever.

Rawls subsequently joined Je Suis France and, upon his move to San Francisco, formed the reggae-inspired band Still Flyin'. Mead eventually joined Still Flyin', and in 2010 raised money through Kickstarter to release an album by his solo project Vetran. Finch released an album under the name Dances with Wolves on dcBaltimore2012 in 2002, and currently plays in Atlanta band Night Moves Gold. Griggs currently plays in Je Suis France, Murder Beach, Shitaake Knights (a.k.a. REN, a.k.a. Transmitter), and any number of other bands.

In 2006 the Masters of the Hemisphere briefly reunited to play shows in Athens, Georgia; Lexington, Kentucky; and San Francisco.

"Local Government", a song from Protest a Dark Anniversary, was prominently heard in an environmental PSA that debuted on MTV on August 31, 2006.

The Masters of the Hemisphere recorded a new album in 2010; released by Kindercore Records in 2011, the new album was entitled Maybe These Are the Breaks.

== Discography ==
=== Albums ===
- Masters of the Hemisphere (Kindercore Records, 1998)
- I Am Not a Freemdoom (Kindercore Records, 2000)
- Protest a Dark Anniversary (Kindercore Records, 2002)
- The Last Show Ever (Bumblebear Records, 2003)
- Maybe These Are the Breaks (Kindercore Records, 2011)

=== Singles/E.P.s ===
- Permanent Stranger (dcBaltimore2012, 2002)
- Going On a Trek To Iceland (Kindercore Records)
- Silence (Happy Happy Birthday To Me Records – Singles Club release)
- Better Things (Gentlemen Recordings)
- Second Hand News (Kindercore Records – Singles Club release)
- The Terminal E.P. (Bunch of Beatniks)
