= Fizzle Like a Flood =

American drummer

Fizzle Like a Flood was the moniker Doug Kabourek chose for his one-man recording project. His work is described as “part Halloween soundtrack, part pop music” and utilizes a grungy, diy, punk assortment of sound effects and instruments.

In his earlier career, Kabourek drummed in an early version of what would eventually become The Faint, in addition to Iowa City's Matchbook Shannon. His first solo-artist-under-a-band-name project was The Laces, which released three albums and one sampler under the small indie record label, Mighty Feeble.

Starting yet another DIY project, Kabourek took the name Fizzle Like a Flood from a Tripmaster Monkey song on the album Practice Changes. In 2000 Fizzle Like a Flood released Golden Sand and the Grandstand, a concept album about the Ak-Sar-Ben Race track in Omaha, NE. The album was recorded at home on a computer, and made use of many overdubs for a lush sound.

Two years later, Golden Sand . . . was followed up with the far more stripped-down Flash Paper Queen (The 4-Track Demos). Much of the album was recorded live onto a cassette boom box, then transferred to computer. Although billed as an album of supposed demos, it was a completed work.

The self-titled EP which appeared in 2004 was a return to the more lush production of the first album. It was recorded in Kabourek's spare bedroom.

In 2005, Ernest Jenning offered a (re-)mastered reissue of Golden Sand and the Grandstand with all-new artwork by Frank Holmes (who was the artist for the 1966 Beach Boys album Smile).

Fizzle Like a Flood recorded another album, tentatively titled Love (not to be confused with the single of the same name), which has never been released.

In 2009 the song "Something More" was used in the feature-length movie, April Showers.

Although Kabourek recorded alone, he would often take to the stage in Omaha and Lincoln with a variety of musicians including: Travis Sing, Matt Bowen, James Carrig, Bob Carrig, Jesse Otto, and Anthony Knuppel of Shelter Belt.

Kabourek is currently the singer/drummer in the rock trio At Land, and has another solo project called The Dull Cares.

== Band members ==
- Doug Kabourek — vocals, guitar, bass, drums, keyboards, percussion (2000–2006)

== Discography ==
=== Albums ===
- Golden Sand and the Grandstand (2000 • Unread Records)
- Flash Paper Queen (The 4-Track Demos) (2002 • Ernest Jenning)
- Golden Sand and the Grandstand (2005 • Ernest Jenning remastered reissue)

=== Singles and EPs ===
- Love (2001 • Sideone Records)
- Fizzle Like a Flood s/t EP (2002 • Ernest Jenning)

=== Soundtracks ===
"Something More" April Showers, 2009

- Fizzle Like a Flood at IMDb

=== Compilations ===
- "Don’t Go" NE vs. NC (2002 • Redemption)
