= Masters of the Hemisphere (album) =

Studio album by Masters of the Hemisphere
- Released: October 5, 1999
- Recorded: 1999
- Genre: Indie pop
- Label: Kindercore Records

Masters of the Hemisphere chronology
Masters of the Hemisphere (1999)	I Am Not a Freemdoom (2000)

Professional ratings
Review scores
Source	Rating
AllMusic	4/5 stars

Masters of the Hemisphere is the first full album by the Athens, Georgia-based indie pop band of the same name. Though it lacks the elaborateness of their follow-up, the heavily concept-based I Am Not A Freemdoom, it still maintains the essential element of the band's indie pop songcraft, drawing comparisons to R.E.M., among others.

== Critical reception ==
AllMusic wrote that "while superficially not all that different from many other Kindercore acts, Masters of the Hemisphere have songwriting smarts and instrumental and arranging chops that set them apart."

== Track listing ==
1. "West Essex"
2. "Billy Mitchell"
3. "Saucy Foreign Lass"
4. "Meteor"
5. "Everybody Knows Canada"
6. "Map"
7. "She Plays Guitar"
8. "Your Ship Looks Like A Captain"

=== Additional information ===
The Japanese release of the album contained two bonus tracks - 'Going on a Freak to Iceland' (also known as 'Bat', which appears on the Going on a Trek to Iceland 7"), and 'My Crowd' (also known as 'My Cloud', which appears on the Seven Summers compilation).
