= I Am Not a Freemdoom =

Studio album by Masters of the Hemisphere
- Released: July 31, 2000
- Recorded: 1999
- Genre: Indie pop Twee Pop
- Label: Kindercore Records

Masters of the Hemisphere chronology
Masters of the Hemisphere (1999)	I Am Not a Freemdoom (2000)	Protest a Dark Anniversary (2002)

Professional ratings
Review scores
Source	Rating
AllMusic	4/5 stars
Pitchfork	2.5/10

I Am Not A Freemdoom is the second album by Masters of the Hemisphere, released in 2000 on Kindercore Records. It is a concept album containing a comic book, for which the songs provide the soundtrack.

== Critical reception ==
Exclaim! called the album a "big bomb," writing that "the music is the lone positive point, and the Masters have a great knack for arranging sounds." The Pitch called it "both an incredibly obtuse and somehow curiously listenable disc, and that’s doubly true for fans of chamber pop, an admittedly acquired taste."

== Track listing ==
1. So What About Freemdoom
2. Who Is This Dog?
3. The Dog Who Controls People's Lungs
4. The New Commotion
5. Gorgar's Room
6. Freemdoom's Lab
7. The New Freemdoom
8. The Sun in the Afternoon
9. Summer In Krone Ishta
10. Mal Needs To Talk About The Things He Wants To Say
11. Mal's Throes
12. Calm Calm Coma
13. The Fearsome Duo

=== Additional Information ===
The Japanese version of the album, released on Philter Records, featured two bonus tracks: Creatures (also known as The Roper Song, which appears on Claire de Leon Records' Yearbook compilation), and Minute Map.
