= Savak (band) =

SAVAK
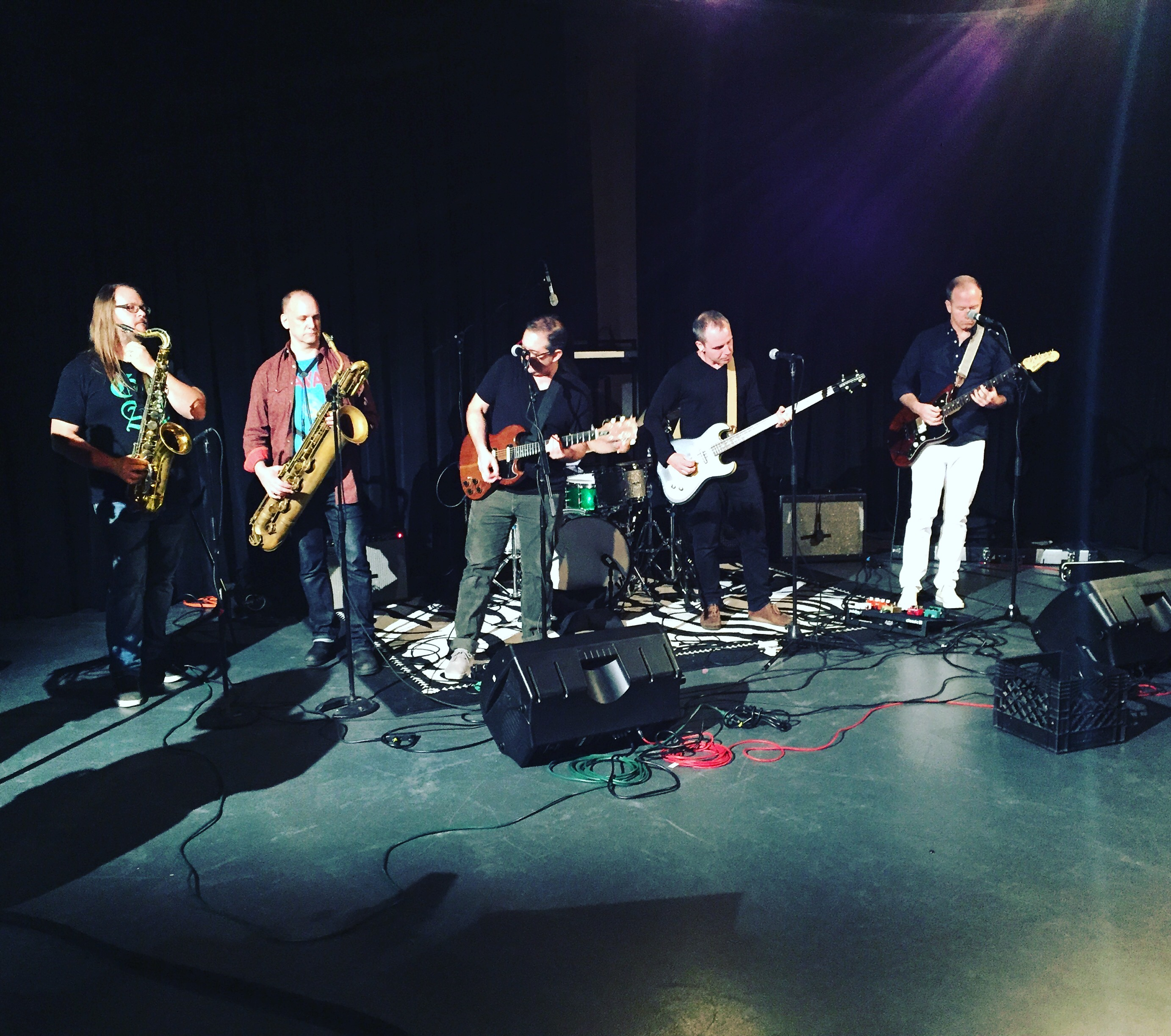

Background information
- Origin: Brooklyn, New York, United States
- Genre: Indie rock
- Years active: 2015–present
- Labels: Ernest Jenning Record Co., Comedy Minus One, Peculiar Works
- Members: Sohrab Habibion, Michael Jaworski and Matt Schulz
- Past members: James Canty, Greg Simpson and Benjamin Van Dyke
- Website: savakband.com

SAVAK is an indie rock band from Brooklyn, New York. Their debut album Best of Luck in Future Endeavors was released on Comedy Minus One in May 2016, garnering positive reviews in Magnet Magazine, Brooklyn Vegan, Noisey, Vol. 1 Brooklyn and Jersey Beat. The record received four stars in Mojo Magazine, who praised their "superior twin-guitar slash." Since then the band has released 5 additional albums, with the next four coming out on the Ernest Jenning record label including Cut-Ups in 2017, Beg Your Pardon in 2018, Rotting Teeth in the Horse's Mouth in 2020 and Human Error / Human Delight in 2022. SAVAK released their latest album Flavors of Paradise in March 2024 as a split release on their own record label, Peculiar Works Music, along with Ernest Jenning.

Sohrab Habibion of SAVAK was previously in the bands Obits and Edsel. Fellow singer and guitar-player Michael Jaworski spent time in both The Cops and Virgin Islands. Drummer Matt Schulz also serves a similar role with Holy Fuck.

== Band members ==
- Sohrab Habibion – vocals, guitar
- Michael Jaworski - vocals, guitar, bass, keys
- Matt Schulz – drums

== Discography ==
=== Albums ===
- Best of Luck in Future Endeavors, LP, CD (2016, Comedy Minus One)
- Cut-Ups, LP, CD (2017, Ernest Jenning)
- Beg Your Pardon, LP, CD (2018, Ernest Jenning)
- Rotting Teeth in the Horse's Mouth, LP, CD (2020, Ernest Jenning)
- Human Error / Human Delight, LP, CD (2022, Peculiar Works/Ernest Jenning/Geenger)
- Flavors Of Paradise, LP (2024, Peculiar Works/Ernest Jenning)
- SQUAWK!, LP (2025, independently released)

=== EP's ===
- Mirror Maker, 12" 45 RPM (2019, Peculiar Works and Ernest Jenning)

=== Singles ===
- "Where Should I Start?" / "Expensive Things" (2018, Modern City Records)
- "Green & Desperate" / "This Dying Lake" (2018, Orangerie)
- "The Point of the Point" / "Checked Out" (2020, Dromedary and Peculiar Works)
- "Feel What You Feel" / "Access Egress" (2020, Peculiar Works)
