= Still Flyin' =

San Francisco-based indie pop band (2004- )

- Origin: San Francisco, California, United States
- Genres: Indie pop, reggae, rocksteady
- Years active: 2004–present
- Labels: Antenna Farm; Ernest Jenning; Moshi Moshi Records; Lost & Lonesome Recording Co.
- Members: Sean Rawls
- Website: Official website

Still Flyin' is an American Indie pop band based in San Francisco, founded in 2004 by Sean Rawls.

== Name of the Band ==
The band is based on the song "Never Gonna Touch the Ground", a song that Rawls wrote and performed in a prior band, Je Suis France. After moving to San Francisco, Rawls recorded the song, which took on a life of its own resulting in the creation of Still Flyin'. The chorus of the song, "Still Flyin', never gonna touch the ground" was the source of the band's name as well as its debut album and title track.

== Formation and History ==
In 2004, Sean Rawls, a veteran of bands Masters of the Hemisphere and Je Suis France moved from Athens, GA to San Francisco, CA. Upon arriving in San Francisco Rawls asked just about everybody he knew to join his new project. Most of the friends he had in San Francisco were fellow musicians he had met through his prior bands, and many of them joined Rawls to form Still Flyin'.

The band played its first live show at the Hemlock Tavern in San Francisco in November, 2004. Shortly thereafter they embarked on a tour of the US West Coast opening for Architecture in Helsinki. In August, 2006 they went on their first tour of Scandinavia, playing at the Emmaboda Festival in Sweden. During this tour they were joined onstage by Jens Lekman. Still Flyin' returned to Scandinavia in 2007. In 2008 they performed in Australia's St Jerome's Laneway Festival, where they met Spiral Stairs. He curated the 2008 Sled Island Festival in Calgary, Alberta, Canada, and invited Still Flyin'. In early 2009 Still Flyin' toured Europe and returned to Australia to play St. Jerome's Laneway Festival once again. They played at the South by Southwest (SXSW) festival in Austin, Texas in early spring and summer saw them touring Europe once again, where they performed at the Secret Garden Party festival in the UK.

Still Flyin' signed with Antenna Farm in 2006 and released 2 EP's. In 2008, the band signed with Ernest Jenning (US), London-based Moshi Moshi and Australian label Lost and Lonesome for the release of their first full-length record.

== Musical style ==
Still Flyin's sound is generally classified as reggae or rocksteady. However, the band has coined its own term to classify its sound and outlook: hammjamm, which is loosely defined as "when a good time gets better" and with lifestyle ramifications involving "friends, beers, high fives, parties and enjoying life to the fullest".

Michael Edwards of Exclaim! wrote that the band's early live shows "consisted of 15 people onstage and they played reggae-tinged pop." He observed how the group later settled into an "80s-inspired groove... awash with sweeping waves of atmospheric synths, leaning heavily towards New Order and Orchestral Manoeuvres in the Dark."

== Members ==
Although the band started and is based in San Francisco, its members now stretch to all corners of the world. The band is made up of a "core" lineup with a long roster of "spiritual members", who join the band for live performances when geography permits.

Current Core Lineup:
Sean Rawls – vocals, guitar (Masters of the Hemisphere, Je Suis France)
Zach Moran – guitar
Phil Horan – drums (Maserati)
Maria Niubo – keys, vocals
Samuele Palazzi – bass (The Calorifer Is Very Hot, The Ian Fays)

Members on Past Recordings:
Yoshi Nakamoto – drums (The Aislers Set, Scenic Vermont, Poastal, Eux Autres)
Gabe Saucedo – vibraphone, saxophone, guitar, vocals (Red Pony Clock)
Bren Mead – percussion, guitar, bass, drums, vocals (Masters of the Hemisphere, Veteran, Summer Hymns)
Mark Monnone – bass (The Lucksmiths)
Mindy Schweitzer-Rawls – vocals
Marjan Esfandiari – vocals
Jaime Knight – vocals (Poundsign, Dear Nora)
Gary Olson – trumpet, vocals (The Ladybug Transistor)
Frank Jordan – saxophone (Bright Lights)
Isobel Knowles – trumpet, keys, vocals (Architecture in Helsinki, The Icypoles)
Alicia Vanden Heuvel – keys, vocals (The Aislers Set, Poundsign)
Drew Cramer – bass (Personal and the Pizzas, the Mantles)
Lizeth Santos – vocals
Becky Barron – vocals (Poundsign, Kids On A Crime Spree, Bright Lights)
Brian Girgus – bongos (lowercase, Track Star)
Adrian Finch – keys, percussion, saxophone, vocals (Masters of the Hemisphere, Night Moves Gold, Dances With Wolves, Elf Power, Summer Hymns)

Past Live Performers:
Wyatt Cusick – bass, guitar (Track Star, The Aislers Set)
Carrie Jedlicka – keys, vocals
Ice Bergeron – reverb tank (Je Suis France, Peace Goat)
OJ Hammond – guru (Je Suis France, Excalibrah)
Ake Stromer – saxophone (Love Is All, James Ausfahrt)
Tara Shackell – trombone, vocals (Architecture in Helsinki, The Icypoles)
Gus Franklin – percussion (Architecture in Helsinki, Sheahan Drive, The Smallgoods)
Anna Storakers – vocals
Brody Railton – reverb tank
Josephine Olausson – vocals (Love Is All, Girlfrendo)
Richard Baluyut – guitar (Versus)
Markus Gorsch – bongos (Love Is All, Girlfrendo, Glenn und Glenn)
Jens Lekman – guitar, vocals (Jens Lekman)

== Influences ==
Rawls's songwriting is influenced by a lot of popular music. Of note are the songs mentioned in the lyrics to H-O-T-T-C-H-O-R-D: Electric Avenue, Funkytown, All Night Long, Walk of Life, Turn to Stone and What a Fool Believes. In addition, Rawls is a fan of the music of Talking Heads, Konono N°1, Kraftwerk, Christopher Cross and many others.

When asked in interviews about influences, Rawls has consistently mentioned Matthew McConaughey, whom the band regards as a lifestyle role model.

== Discography ==
=== Albums ===
| Year | Details |
|---|---|
| 2009 | Never Gonna Touch The Ground: Released: April 2009; Labels: Ernest Jenning (US – CD), Moshi Moshi (UK), Lost and Lonesome (AUS), Antenna Farm (US – LP); Formats: LP, CD, download |
| 2012 | On A Bedroom Wall: Released: May 2012; Labels: Ernest Jenning (US), Highline (UK), Lost and Lonesome (AUS), Staatsakt (DE), We Were Never Being Boring (IT), Uninhabitable Mansions (cassette); Formats: LP, CD, cassette, download |

=== Singles and EPs ===
| Year | Details |
|---|---|
| 2006 | Time Wrinkle EJ: Released: August 2006; Labels: Antenna Farm (US), Lost and Lonesome (AUS); Formats: LP, CD, download |
| 2007 | Za Cloud EJ: Released: April 2007; Labels: Antenna Farm (US); Formats: CD, download |
| 2008 | Good Thing It's A Ghost Town Around Here: Released: October 2008; Labels: Moshi Moshi (UK), Lost and Lonesome (AUS); Formats: 7", CD, download; Radio Charts: #10 JJJ (Australia) |
| 2009 | Forever Dudes: Released: January 2009; Labels: Moshi Moshi (UK); Formats: download |
| 2009 | The Hott Chord is Struck: Released: July 2009; Labels: Moshi Moshi (UK); Formats: download |
| 2010 | Runaway Train II: Released: February 2010; Labels: Ernest Jenning (US), Moshi Moshi (UK), Lost and Lonesome (AUS); Formats: 7", download |
| 2010 | A Party In Motion EP: Released: July 2010; Labels: Ernest Jenning (US), Moshi Moshi (UK), Lost and Lonesome (AUS), We Were Never Being Boring (IT); Formats: 12", download |
| 2010 | Victory Walker: Released: October 2010; Labels: Ernest Jenning (US); Formats: 7", download |
| 2012 | Travelin' Man: Released: March 2012; Labels: Ernest Jenning (US), Highline (UK), Lost and Lonesome (AUS), Staatsakt (DE); Formats: 7", download; Radio Charts: #99 Top100 Mainstream Airplaycharts (Germany) |
| 2012 | Spirits: Released: June 2012; Labels: Highline (UK); Formats: download |

=== Compilations ===
| Year | Details |
|---|---|
| 2011 | Neu Ideas: Released: January 2011; Labels: Ernest Jenning (US – CD), Lost and Lonesome (AUS); Formats: CD, download; Collects 2010 singles and EP and includes remixes by Love Is All, Hood Internet, Papercuts, Signals, Elephant & Castle, Color of the Sun, and Birds & Batteries |
