= Skeletonbreath =

US musical group

- Origin: Brooklyn, New York, U.S.
- Genres: Gypsy punk Indie; Experimental
- Years active: 2002–2011
- Members: Bob Pycior; Andrew Platt; Tris Palazzolo
- Website: Official website

Skeletonbreath is a Brooklyn, New York based instrumental rock trio signed to Ernest Jenning Records. Their music has been self-described as "Transylvanian Surf Rock" and "Halloween party music." The band is composed of Andrew Platt on electric bass, Bob Pycior on electric violin, and Tris Palazzolo on drums. Their debut album, Louise, was independently released in 2005 and has been described by TheHVScene.com as "A perfect CD." They were featured in Progression Magazine after opening the Progday festival, received acclaim in the Orlando City Beat, and were featured on the DIY website Ruberecords.org. Despite having acquired much notoriety within the New York music scene, Skeletonbreath retained a strong DIY ethic, playing in basements and living rooms as often as at festivals.

== History ==
Andrew Platt, Crockett Doob, and Bob Pycior grew up together in upstate New York, and played together in a number of short-lived groups throughout middle school and high school. In the summer of 2002 the three formed Skeletonbreath while home from college, and shortly after began touring the northeast. Bob Pycior played in Kiss Kiss before quitting in 2005 in favor of Skeletonbreath, causing what appears to have become a lasting rivalry between the two groups. In 2007, Doob left the band to pursue other creative interests, including assisting in the production of a film and writing a novel, and was replaced by Tris Palazzolo after a series of auditions for the role. A second full-length album, Eagle's Nest, Devil's Cave, was released on May 19, 2009, on Ernest Jenning Records.

== Discography ==
=== Albums ===
- Louise (Self-Released, 2006)
- Eagle's Nest, Devil's Cave (Ernest Jenning, 2009)
- Eagle's Nest, Devil's Cave (500 press run Vinyl Format LP with CD included) (Safety Meeting Records, 2009)

=== Sources ===
- Punk News
- Official Myspace Page
- Official Website
