= Takka Takka =

American indie rock band

- Origin: Brooklyn, New York
- Genre: Indie rock
- Years active: 2006–present
- Members: Gabe Levine; Conrad Doucette; Craig Montoro
- Past members: John Paul Jones; Damion Jurrens; Grady Jurrens; Drew Thurlow; Rene Planchon

Takka Takka is an American indie rock band from Brooklyn, New York. Performing since 2006, the band's members include Gabe Levine, Conrad Doucette, Rene Planchon and Craig Montoro (formerly of Volcano, I'm Still Excited!!).

Takka Takka began when Levine returned from a "near-disastrous" year in Texas. Back in Brooklyn, he began recording demos of new material, and recruited some old friends to help him work out a live set. Takka Takka soon played its first show in a basement in Williamsburg in March 2006. Takka Takka's constantly rotating line has seen a new band with each album. Doucette and Levine remain the only constant members.

In April 2006, the group began recording in the Brooklyn studio Seaside Lounge, resulting in their first album, We Feel Safer at Night. The album impressed Clap Your Hands Say Yeah, who invited the band to accompany them on a high-profile U.S. tour in fall 2006. Takka Takka traveled to Britain in February 2007 to play their first London gigs, and to Austin, Texas, for SXSW in March 2007. In May 2007, the band signed to Ernest Jenning Record Co.

Takka Takka recorded a cover version of Phil Collins' "In the Air Tonight" for Engine Room Recordings' compilation album Guilt by Association Vol. 2, which was released in November 2008.

In 2008, Takka Takka released their second full-length album, Migration. Produced by Clap Your Hands Say Yeah's drummer, Sean Greenhalgh, Migration was a departure from their first album. On Migration, Takka Takka explored minimalistic synthesizer soundscapes, African guitars and percussion poly-rhythms. The album features Bryan Devendorf, the drummer for The National and sometime percussionist for Takka Takka. Migration was released to semi-critical praise receiving positive reviews from the New York Times and Pitchfork.com. Migration was released in Europe in 2010 by Lili-is-pi records which brought the band to tour continental Europe for the first time.

In an interview at SXSW 2011, Takka Takka announced that they were working on a new album called Mover / Believer. The album was eventually released as A.M. Landscapes on November 20, 2012, by Ernest Jenning Record Co. The album was produced by Phil Palazzolo (New Pornographers, Okkervil River, Nicole Atkins) and had contributions from Bryan Devendorf (The National), Kyle Resnick (Beirut), Tim Albright, Hideaki Aomori, Alex Sopp and the Osso Quartet, as well as arrangements by Michael Atkinson.

Levine released a solo album under the name Gabriel and the Hounds in 2011.

Doucette has occasionally performed as a live percussionist with The National, most notably during New York stops on the band's High Violet tour. In March 2012, he performed with Bob Weir of the Grateful Dead and members of The National for a HeadCount awareness-raising webcast performance called The Bridge Session. In 2016 Doucette served as Co-Curator and performer on Day Of The Dead, a tribute to the Grateful Dead spearheaded by The National and released on 4AD. Doucette also appears on Blue Mountain, a Bob Weir solo album conceived and created by Weir as well as musicians involved with the 2012 The Bridge Session performance.

== Members ==
- Gabriel Levine – vocals, keyboard, guitar
- Craig Montoro – bass guitar
- Conrad Doucette – drums, percussion

== Discography ==
- Fall Apart Art (EP, 2006)
- We Feel Safer at Night (LP, 2006)
- Talk Faster (EP, 2007)
- Migration (LP, 2008)
- A.M. Landscapes (LP, 2012)
