= Chris Mills (musician) =

American singer-songwriter

- Origin: (United States) Chicago, Illinois
- Genres: Indie rock, folk
- Instrument(s): Vocals, Guitar
- Years active: 1996? – present
- Website: chrismillsmusic.com

Christopher Mills is an American singer-songwriter. In the 1990s and early 2000s he established himself as a mainstay on the independent Chicago folk and alternative country scene before moving to Brooklyn in 2003.

After playing in a high-school speed metal band with Rob Lloyd named Crystal Meth Death, Mills turned his attention to country and folk music. Mills released his first EPs in 1996 and 1997, and signed to Chicago indie label Sugar Free Records in 1998. A tour in England followed his 2000 release, Kiss It Goodbye. After the collapse of Sugar Free Records, Mills released The Silver Line on his own label, Powerless Pop Records.

In 2005 Mills signed with Brooklyn indie label Ernest Jenning Record Co. and released The Wall to Wall Sessions, an album recorded and mixed entirely live to 2-track tape. He toured England in 2005, following an American tour opening for Lucero.

In 2008 he released Living In The Aftermath on Ernest Jenning followed again by tours in the U.S. and Europe. In 2009, the track "Such a Beautiful Thing" from Living In the Aftermath was featured on the popular television show Criminal Minds in the episode "Cradle To The Grave". In 2011 he released The Heavy Years 2000-2010 a career retrospective collection.

== Discography ==
=== Albums ===
- Chris Mills Plays and Sings EP (1996)
- Nobody's Favorite EP (1997)
- Every Night Fight for Your Life (Sugar Free Records, 1998)
- Kiss It Goodbye (Sugar Free/Loose Music, 2000)
- The Silver Line (Powerless Pop Records/Loose Music, 2002)
- Tell it Like it Isn't EP (all covers) (Powerless Pop, 2003)
- Plays and Sings/Nobody's Favorite re-release compilation (Powerless Pop, 2003)
- The Wall to Wall Sessions (Powerless Pop/Ernest Jenning, 2005)
- Living in the Aftermath (Ernest Jenning, 2008)
- The Heavy Years 2000-2010 (Ernest Jenning, 2011)
- Alexandria (Loud Romantic Records), 2014

=== Compilations ===
- Not One Light Red: A Desert Extended (Sunset Alliance, 2003)

Track: Waiting for Superman
