= O'Death =

American gothic country band

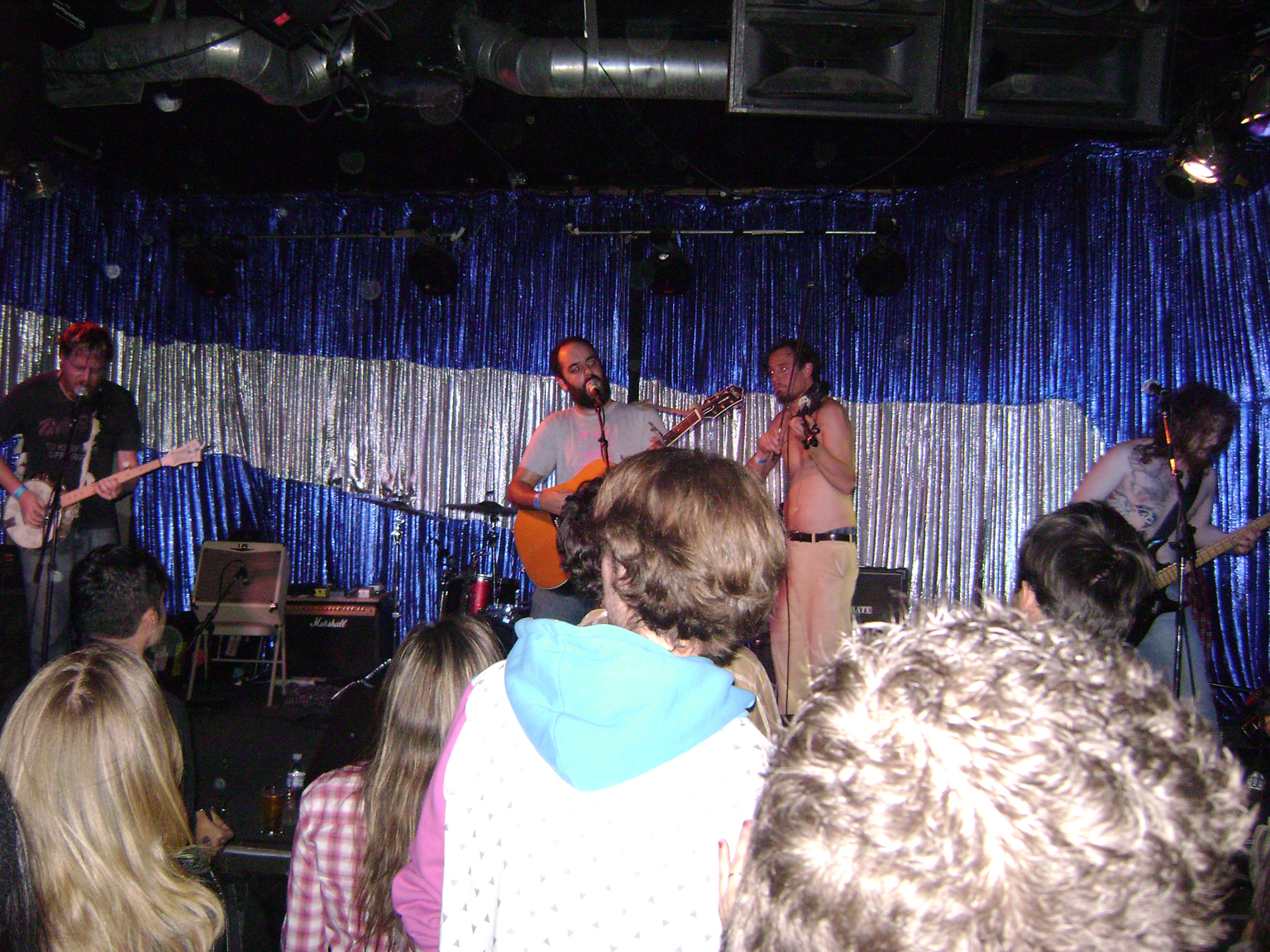
- O'Death at the Spaceland in Los Angeles 2008

Background information
- Origin: Brooklyn, New York
- Genre: Gothic country
- Years active: 2003–present
- Labels: Ernest Jenning; City Slang; Gigantic Music; Kemando; Northern Spy
- Members: Bob Pycior; Gabe Darling; Greg Jamie; David Rogers-Berry; Jesse Newman; Dan Sager

O’Death (stylized as o'death) is an American gothic country band from Brooklyn, New York. They combine elements of folk, bluegrass, punk, metal, gothic and Americana music.

== History ==
All the members of O'Death met between the years of 2000 and 2003 at SUNY Purchase. With Greg Jamie on guitar and vocals, Gabe Darling on electric guitar, ukulele, piano, and vocals, David Rogers-Berry on drums, Robert Pycior on violin, and Andrew Platt on bass - O'Death put together a very raw, 10-track CD-R, entitled Carl Nemelka Family Photographs, recorded by Joshua Benash (of the bands Kiss Kiss and Vuvuzela) in 2004.

In 2005, Gabe Darling switched to banjo and ukulele, the band added bass player Jesse Newman to the permanent lineup, and O'Death played a year-long monthly residency at the now defunct Apocalypse Lounge in NYC. The band built a local fan base around their irreverent take on Americana by playing dive bars in the East Village and house parties around Brooklyn, as they worked on new material for their second self-released LP, Head Home. In 2006, they took the stage alongside acts such as Battles, Dr. Dog, Art Brute, Langhorne Slim, THEUSAISAMONSTER, and Old Time Relijun in New York City, and began touring the United States.

The band's nonstop touring caught the attention of the New York-based Ernest Jenning Record Co., who re-released Head Home in June, 2007. Later that summer, Germany-based label City Slang released Head Home in Europe.

O'Death continued to tour the US and Europe throughout 2007, putting out a limited edition (500 copies) vinyl version of Head Home on Ernest Jenning Record Co./City Slang, followed by a 7" single of two new songs, "Low Tide" and "I Think I'm Fine", as well as a cover of Pixies' "Nimrod's Son" as an internet bonus track. Head Home was nominated for a 2007 Shortlist Prize.

On February 5, 2008, Gigantic Music released a new 7", which features the songs "Spider Home" and "Silk Hole". In August 2008, City Slang released O'Death's second LP, Broken Hymns, across Europe and Australia. The record was released in the United States later that year by Kemado Records.. The album included a new version of the single, "Lowtide", with a video directed by Oscar-nominated, Benh Zeitlin. Kemado Records also released a 7" single in 2009 for the song, "Underwater Nightmare", b-sided with a cover of "Mongoloid" by Devo, and an original song called, "Prince of Beasts." In this time, O'Death toured with Murder By Death, and later on with Les Claypool, playing main support to both artists.

After being on hiatus due to David Rogers-Berry undergoing cancer treatment, they released the album, Outside, in April, 2011. The first single, "Bugs", from the album was released on 26 January 2011, and the band toured extensively in the US and Europe in support of the record.

The band's newest album, Out Of Hands We Go, was released in October 2014 on Northern Spy Records. The album was recorded and mixed by Caleb Mulkerin (of Big Blood, Fire on Fire, and Cerberus Shoal) in South Portland, ME.

== Discography ==
=== Albums ===
- Carl Nemelka Family Photographs (Self-released, 2004)
- Head Home (Self-released, 2006; Ernest Jenning Record Co., 2007)
- Broken Hymns, Limbs and Skin (Kemado Records, 2008)
- Outside (Ernest Jenning Record Co., 2011)
- Out of Hands We Go (Northern Spy Records, 2014)

=== EPs and singles ===
- Carl Nemelka Family Photographs EP (Self-released, 2005)
- “Low Tide” / ”I Think I’m Fine” / “Nimrod’s Son” 7” (Ernest Jenning Record Co., 2007)
- “Spider Home” / “Silk Hole” 7” (Gigantic Music, 2008)
- "Brother" / "Home" 7" split single with Murder By Death (self-released by Murder By Death, 2009)
- Underwater Nightmare 7” (Kemado Records, 2009)

=== Videography ===
Year	Title	Director(s)
2007	"Down to Rest"	Jonathan Phelps
2008	"Low Tide"	Benjamin Zeitlin
2011	"Bugs"	Gabe Darling
2011	"Black Dress"	Dave Woolner
2014	"Roam"	Gabe Darling

== Members ==
- Greg Jamie - vocals, guitar, harmonium
- Gabe Darling - backing vocals, ukulele, guitar, banjo, piano
- David Rogers-Berry - drums, percussion
- Bob Pycior - violin, piano
- Jesse Newman - bass, piano

Past members:

- Dan Sager - trombone, euphonium, keys
- Tristan Palozola - trombone, percussion, auxiliary
- Andrew Platt - bass guitar
