= Rye Coalition =

American post-hardcore band

- Origin: New Jersey, United States
- Genres: Post-hardcore, emo
- Years active: 1994-present
- Labels: Gern Blandsten; Tiger Style
- Members: Ralph Cuseglio; Jon Gonnelli; Dave Leto; Justin Morey; Herb Wiley
- Past members: Gregg Leto

Rye Coalition is a post-hardcore band based in Jersey City, New Jersey, United States. The band has released four albums, three EPs, a split 12-inch with Karp, and several singles. Described by member David Leto as "a loud rock and roll band with obvious punk influences and many classic rock influences", Rye Coalition has often been associated with genres such as emo and post-hardcore.

Rye Coalition has released most of their albums on the Tiger Style or Gern Blandsten Records labels. The band's most recent album, Curses, was produced by Dave Grohl. The album name refers to the band's 2003 deal to sign with the ill-fated DreamWorks Records. After Dreamworks Records was sold to Universal/Vivendi, the band ended up "jumping from one sinking ship to another", eventually ending up at Interscope Records.

== History ==
Rye Coalition began from a desire between Jersey City high school kids Jon Gonnelli (guitar) and Ralph Cuseglio (vocals) to form a band. They found their drummer in David Leto - an ex-member of legendary local Jersey band, Merel, whose status gave the group some instant interest in their home area - and a bassist in Leto's childhood friend, Justin Angelo Morey (Leto and Morey became friends while attending Our Lady of Mercy school together) Cuseglio, Gonnelli and Leto were schoolmates at St. Peter's Preparatory School. Taking a cue from local hardcore acts like Merel in their writing, the band (simply called Rye at the time) played chaotic, distorted songs with screamed vocals and more emphasis on dynamics than speed. Shortly after forming, Rye added Herb Wiley as a second guitarist.

The group's first recorded output took shape in the form of a demo entitled The Dancing Man, in 1994. The band quickly followed this with a self-booked tour of the east coast. The Dancing Man, as well as Rye's energetic live performances, caught the interest of local New Jersey label Troubleman Unlimited Records, who offered to press a 7-inch for the band. The record, entitled Teen-age Dance Session, featured three songs and garnered the band further attention in the independent music scene.

Following the release of their first record, the band recorded two songs for a split 12-inch with Olympia, Washington's Karp, also released by Troubleman. The split would feature the band's first recording of the track "White Jesus of 114th Street," a fan favorite which remains in the band's setlists to this day. A split 7-inch with Harrisonburg, Virginia's Maximillian Colby was also released around this time. The Karp / Rye split would later be reissued on CD by Troubleman and also include the songs from the Teen-age Dance Session 7-inch. In 1995, the band crossed the Canadian border to play their first out-of-country show in Cambelville, Ontario.

Wiley parted ways with the band in 1996, following the release of the New Sheriff In Town 7-inch (the band's first for New Jersey's Gern Blandsten label), in order to attend school out-of-state. The 7-inch also marked their first time working with engineer Alap Momin of Dälek.

Rye (by now adding "Coalition" to their name - or sometimes "Rye and the Coalition") continued on during downtime from their educations, now acting as a quartet. They wrote and recorded their first full-length LP, entitled Hee Saw Dhuh Kaet, in 1997. The band chose to again work with Alap Momin, and the album was released by Gern Blandsten Records.

At this point Dave Leto moved to bass and recruited his brother, Greg (also an ex-member of Merel) to take over the drums. The new lineup began work on their next album, entitled The Lipstick Game. Two years in the making, the album was again engineered by Alap Momin, is seen by many of their early fans as the band's pinnacle. It documents some of Rye Coalition's most powerful and experimental songwriting. Opening song "The Prosthetic Aesthetic" quickly ascertains that the band has sacrificed none of its energy, whereas songs like "Baby's Got A New Flame" and the title track exemplify the fusion of post-hardcore with classic rock that Rye Coalition would perfect on later releases, while the acoustic ballad "Tangiers" and closing instrumental track "Through The Years" are probably the group's most melodic songs ever recorded.

The record was well received by fans and the music press, and Rye Coalition again embarked on a tour to support the album, with Greg Leto leaving the band and Morey returning to take up bass duties again (Dave Leto switched back to drums). Following that, things slowed down again for the band, with shows happening on occasion as the members continued with their educations. Herb Wiley also returned to the fold in 2000 as the band was writing for their next album, thus reinstating the full original lineup of the band, which remains to this day.

In 2001, the band signed a deal with independent label Tiger Style, and recorded their third LP, On Top, this time working with respected engineer Steve Albini. The third album, released in 2002, was again a critical success, although some fans were dismayed by the band's further movement into classic rock territory. Rye Coalition now proudly wore their AC/DC and Led Zeppelin influences on their sleeve alongside those of Shellac and Fugazi. The record showcases a synthesis of those styles: arena rock guitar riffs and direct, often humorous, lyrics coupled with off kilter rhythms and distorted basslines.

The band undertook several tours to support the album, including a stop at 2002's Michigan Fest, from which their performance of "White Jesus of 114th Street" was included on a documentary DVD of the festival. A 5-song EP of tracks recorded with Albini during the On Top sessions was released in 2003 on Tiger Style as the Jersey Girls EP. The band also contributed covers of AC/DC's "Whole Lotta Rosie" and Grand Funk Railroad's "Got This Thing On The Move" for a contribution to Sub Pop Records' Singles Club series.

The critical success of On Top caught the attention of several major labels, and Rye Coalition was offered the opportunity to sign a major record contract for the release of their next album. The band decided to sign with DreamWorks Records. The band was signed by A&R Kenny "Tick" Salcido. The label had a history and reputation of helping up-and-coming bands receive more widespread attention and radio play (they had recently added such acts as Jimmy Eat World and Saves the Day to their roster), and Rye Coalition was able to maintain full creative control of their music.

To record their fourth album, the band put together a "wish list" of producers that they would like to work with. At the top of the list was ex-Nirvana drummer and Foo Fighters front man Dave Grohl. The band was surprised to find out that Grohl was not only a fan of the band, but also eager to work with them, and even more surprised when their record label agreed to the collaboration.

Production work on Rye Coalition's fourth full-length (later to be entitled Curses) began in 2004, but the record would not see release until 2006, and would not be released by Dreamworks. In October 2003, Dreamworks was acquired by Universal Music Group, and by 2004 was shut down completely. The artists on DreamWorks were split up and placed on either the Geffen Records or Interscope Records. Rye Coalition found themselves on a label who had essentially no interest in them (despite the label's telling the band otherwise), and although the bulk of the recording had been completed for Curses by this time, the record remained in limbo, with the Interscope's lack of interest in releasing it becoming more apparent to the band as time passed and mixing of the record was put on hold.

Rye Coalition took to the road during this time, relishing the opportunity to play the new songs live while struggling to get their record released properly. Grohl took the band as openers for Foo Fighters which gained them much exposure to mainstream audiences. An opening slot touring with The Mars Volta and Queens of the Stone Age garnered them further attention, but by 2005, the band had realized that Interscope had no intention of releasing their album.

The members of Rye Coalition asked to be released from their contract with Interscope and for the rights to the album, and were eventually granted both. By the end of 2005, the band had proceeded with mixing and mastering the album (again with help from Grohl), and decided to title the record Curses, in reference to their recent debacle with the label.

Rye Coalition then began another label search in an attempt to find a home for the record. They eventually decided to return to their roots and release the album with New Jersey's Gern Blandsten Records. A pre-release EP entitled Chariots On Fire was released as an iTunes exclusive in 2006, featuring three tracks from the upcoming album and one exclusive song, "Gone With The Windshield." By the time Curses was ready for release, it had expanded to also include a bonus DVD of the band's trials and tribulations while making the album.

Curses was finally made available in 2006 to critical and commercial success (thanks in no small part to the bands relentless touring). The new songs all but abandon Rye Coalition's early post-hardcore sound in favor of punchy, straight-head hard rock. A documentary about the making of the album, including footage working with Dave Grohl at Sound City Studios, was also included on Curses.

In 2007, bassist Justin Morey announced that he was quitting Rye Coalition to pursue The Black Hollies full-time.

On February 19, 2011, Rye Coalition reunited for a single sold-out show at Maxwell's in Hoboken, New Jersey.

A full-length documentary called "Rye Coalition - The Story of the Hard Luck 5" was released in 2014 about the band.

On July 4, 2021, on an appearance on the Protonic Reversal podcast, Dave Leto revealed that Rye Coalition were playing together again and planning on recording and releasing new material. Morey, Gonnelli and Wiley currently play in The Black Hollies on Ernest Jenning Records.

Following Chicago label The Numero Group's partnership with Tiger Style in 2024, the band digitally reissued their catalog through Numero, and in 2026 released "Pulaski Skyway & Other Bridges Burned," an LP compiling the band's earliest material, including The Dancing Man and music from their splits with Karp and Maximillian Colby.

In July of 2025 the band released a double A-side 7" of Shellac and Drive Like Jehu covers called Paid in Full, as a tribute to the departed Steve Albini and Rick Froberg. Revealed and spoken of in detail on an episode of Conan Neutron's Protonic Reversal with singer Ralph Cuseglio.

Rye Coalition announced their first show outside New Jersey in early 2026 at Caterwaul in Minneapolis. Numero Group also released Pulaski Skyway & Other Bridges Burned, a collection of demos, splits and 7"s that predate their first record.

== Discography ==
=== Albums ===
- Hee Saw Dhuh Kaet (Gern Blandsten, 1996)
- The Lipstick Game (Gern Blandsten, 1999)
- On Top (Tiger Style Records, 2002)
- Curses (Gern Blandsten, 2006)

=== EPs ===
- The Dancing Man (Demo) (Self-released, 1994)
- Split with Karp (Troubleman Unlimited, 1996)
- Jersey Girls (Tiger Style Records, 2003)
- Chariots On Fire (Gern Blandsten, 2006)

=== Singles ===
- Split with Maximillian Colby (Irony Records/Rent-A-Records, 1995)
- Teen-age Dance Session (Troubleman Unlimited, 1995)
- New Sheriff In Town (Gern Blandsten, 1996)
- Split with The VSS (Super 8 Records, 1998)
- "ZZ Topless" (Tiger Style, 2001)
- Got This Thing On The Move b/w Whole Lotta Rosie (Sub Pop Records, 2003)
- Paid In Full (Self Released, 2025)

=== Compilations ===
- Pulaski Skyway & Other Bridges Burned (The Numero Group, 2026)
