= Adam Thorn =

American singer

- Born: December 16, 1979 (age 46); Waldorf, Maryland, United States
- Occupations: Lyricist, Musician, Songwriter
- Instruments: Vocals, Guitar, Marimba

Adam Gabriel Thorn (born December 16, 1979) spent 1998–2005 as front man and lyricist for Greensboro, North Carolina, indie punk band Kudzu Wish. After bowing out at the top of their game, Thorn started the short lived Warbomb!, was employed as an assistant brewmaster, and then began crafting the music for his solo debut. Upon the release of "Where's The Freedom?" in 2007 Adam Thorn & The Top Buttons, a backing band of rotating members, played sporadic shows culminating in a performance in Greensboro, NC on December 16, 2007.

== Early life ==
Thorn was born in Waldorf, Maryland.

== Discography ==
=== Solo ===
- Where's The Freedom? (March 2007)

=== Compilation ===
- Consensus: Celebrating 36 Years Of College Radio At WQFS Greensboro (2006) song: "Speak, Imagination"
- Taylor 25: A Nostalgic Retrospective (2007) song: "The Kids Are All Wrong"
