= Jupiter (disambiguation) =

Jupiter is the largest planet in the Solar System, named after Jupiter (god), king of the gods in ancient Roman mythology.

Jupiter may also refer to:

== Businesses ==
- Jupiter Fund Management, a British fund management company
- Jupiter Airlines, based in the United Arab Emirates
- Jupiter Communications, the former name of Japanese company J:COM
- Jupiter Corporation, a Japanese game and hardware development studio
- Jupiter Entertainment, an American television production company
- Jupiter Band Instruments, a brand of woodwind, brass, and percussion instruments
- Jupiter Hotel (Portland, Oregon), in the US
- Jupiter Discount Stores, a former brand designation of Kmart for old S.S. Kresge stores

== Fictional characters ==
- Sailor Jupiter or Makoto Kino, in Sailor Moon
- Johnny Jupiter, title character in two separate early American television programs
- Jupiter Jones, from Three Investigators juvenile detective book series
- Jupiter Jones, from the 2015 science-fiction film Jupiter Ascending

== Military ==
- HMS Jupiter, six ships of the British Royal Navy
- USS Jupiter, two ships of the US Navy
- French ship Jupiter (1789)
- French ship Jupiter (1831)
- Jupiter class minelayer, a four-ship class of Spanish mine layers which saw action in the Spanish Civil War
- Operation Jupiter (disambiguation), military operations
- Bristol Jupiter Fighter, an unsuccessful British biplane introduced in 1924
- PGM-19 Jupiter, a U.S. Air Force medium-range ballistic missile, produced from 1956 to 1961
- Jupiter Aerobatic Team, the Indonesian Air Force aerobatic display team

== Music ==
=== Instruments ===
- Jupiter Stradivarius, a violin
- Jupiter, ex-Goding Stradivarius, a violin
- Roland Jupiter (disambiguation), various analog music synthesizers

=== Groups ===
- Jupiter (band), a Japanese power metal band

=== Works ===
==== Albums ====
- Jupiter (Atheist album) (2010)
- Jupiter (Cave In album) (2000)
- Jupiter (Bump of Chicken album) (2002)
- Jupiter (Starfucker album) (2009)

==== Songs ====
- "Jupiter" (hymn) or "I Vow to Thee, My Country", a British patriotic song and Anglican hymn (1921)
- "Jupiter" (Swallow the Moon), a song by Jewel from Spirit (1998)
- "Jupiter" (Earth, Wind & Fire song) (1978)
- "Jupiter" (Buck-Tick song) (1991)
- "Jupiter", by 311 from Transistor (1997)
- "Jupiter", by Ayaka Hirahara (2008)
- "Jupiter", by Coldplay from Moon Music (2024)
- "Jupiter", by Mereba and JID from Spilligion (2020)
- "Jupiter", by The Presidents of the United States of America from Freaked Out and Small (2000)
- "Jupiter", by Sufjan Stevens, Bryce Dessner, Nico Muhly and James McAlister from Planetarium (2017)

==== Other works ====
- "Jupiter", a track on Interstellar Space by John Coltrane
- Jupiter, disc 1 of Stadium Arcadium by the Red Hot Chili Peppers
- "Jupiter" or Symphony No. 41, a symphony by Mozart
- "Jupiter, the Bringer of Jollity", the fourth movement in The Planets, Gustav Holst's orchestral suite

== People ==
- Jupiter Apple (1968–2015), Brazilian singer
- Jupiter Ghosh (born 1989), Bangladeshi cricketer
- Jupiter Hammon (1711–before 1806), poet and first African-American writer to be published in the present-day US
- Jupiter Yves Ngangue (born 1980), Cameroonian former footballer
- Jupi77er (born 1992), Brazilian singer

== Places ==
=== United States ===
- Jupiter, Florida, a town
- Jupiter Island, a barrier island in Florida
- Jupiter, North Carolina, an unincorporated community
- Jupiter Township, Kittson County, Minnesota

=== Elsewhere ===
- Jupiter, Romania, a summer resort on the Black Sea
- Jupiter Glacier, Alexander Island, Antarctica
- Jupiter Formation, a geologic formation in Quebec, Canada
- Jupiter River, a river in Anticosti Island, Quebec, Canada
- Jupiter Reef, a supposed, likely "phantom", reef in the South Pacific Ocean

== Science and technology ==
- Windows UI Library, code name "Jupiter" supports XAML controls for Windows Runtime
- Jupiter JVM, the Java virtual machine
- Jupiter, the first stable version of the elementary OS Linux distribution
- Jupiter project, a DEC project for a PDP-10 replacement
- Jupiter Ace, a british 8 bits home computer
- JUPITER trial, a clinical trial investigating rosuvastatin
- Jupiter (lens), a series of Soviet camera lenses
- Polyura jupiter, a butterfly of the family Nymphalidae
- Syntypistis jupiter, a species of moth of the family Notodontidae

=== Space and rocketry ===
- Rockets:
  - Jupiter-C, for sounding
  - Jupiter-A
- Jupiter (rocket family), a proposed family of space shuttle-derived launch vehicles
- Jupiter (spacecraft), a proposed space tug being developed by Lockheed Martin
- Mercury-Jupiter, the Jupiter variant of the Project Mercury rockets

== Science fiction ==
- Jupiter (novel), 2000, by Ben Bova
- Jupiter (magazine), edited by Ian Redman
- Jupiter Award (science fiction award) for writing (presented infrequently from 1974 to 1978)
- Jupiter 2, a spaceship in the television series Lost in Space

== Transportation ==
- Jupiter (1805 ship)
- Halton Jupiter, a 1970s British human-powered aircraft
- MV Jupiter, various ships
- MS Jupiter, a cruiseferry
- Jupiter (tugboat), preserved in Philadelphia, Pennsylvania
- Jupiter (locomotive), a steam-powered locomotive
- Jowett Jupiter, a sports car
- Moynet Jupiter, unsuccessful executive airplane model, introduced 1963
- Bristol Jupiter, a British radial aeroplane engine, developed during First World War
- Júpiter (Mexico City Metrobús), a BRT station in Mexico City
- TVS Jupiter, a scooter manufactured by TVS Motor Company
- SS Jupiter (Ropner, 1895), a British cargo ship in service 1895-1926
- FV Jupiter, a German fishing trawler and vorpostenboot in service 1936-44

== Other uses ==
- CE Júpiter, a Spanish football club based in Barcelona
- Jupiter (ice hockey team), a defunct team that was based in Kharkiv, Ukraine
- Jupiter (roller coaster), a wooden roller coaster in Beppu, Ōita, Japan
- Jupiter (apple), an apple cultivar
- Jupiter grape, an interspecific seedless Muscat grape
- Jupiter (given name)
- Jupiter Community High School, Jupiter, Florida
- Jupiter Christian School, Jupiter, Florida
- Jupiter field, a natural gas and oil field in the Atlantic Ocean off Brazil
- GSP Jupiter, a drilling rig in the Black Sea
- Jupiter, an award presented at the L'International des Feux Loto-Québec fireworks festival
- Winter Storm Jupiter, a 2017 U.S. storm
- Jupiter, the main fire engine in Fireman Sam

== See also ==
- Jupiter Amphitheatre, a valley in Victoria Land, Antarctica
- Jupiter and Lake Worth Railway in Florida
- Jupiter Museum of Art, a contemporary art museum in Shenzhen, China
- Project Jupyter, nonprofit computing organization
- Jupiters, a Pakistani music band
- Jupiters Hotel & Casino (of Gold Coast, Queensland, Australia; now rebranded as The Star Gold Coast)
- Jupiters Limited, an Australian gambling company that merged with Tabcorp
- Jupiler, a Belgian beer
