= Jupiter (given name) =

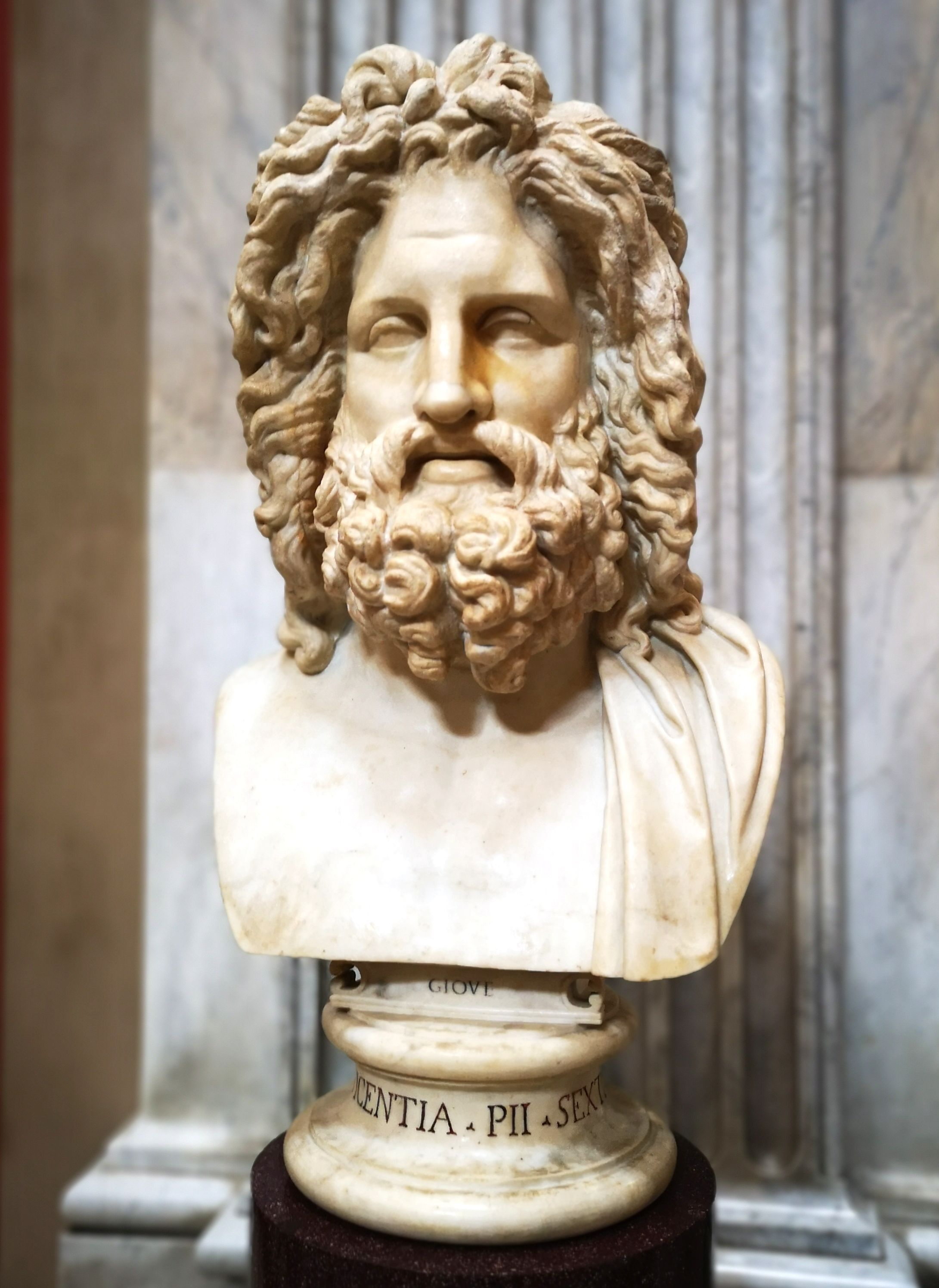
- Statue of Jupiter at the Vatican.
- Gender: unisex

Origin
- Origin: Latin
- Meaning: given in reference to the Roman god Jupiter or to the planet named after the mythological deity.

Other names
- See also: Jovie (given name)

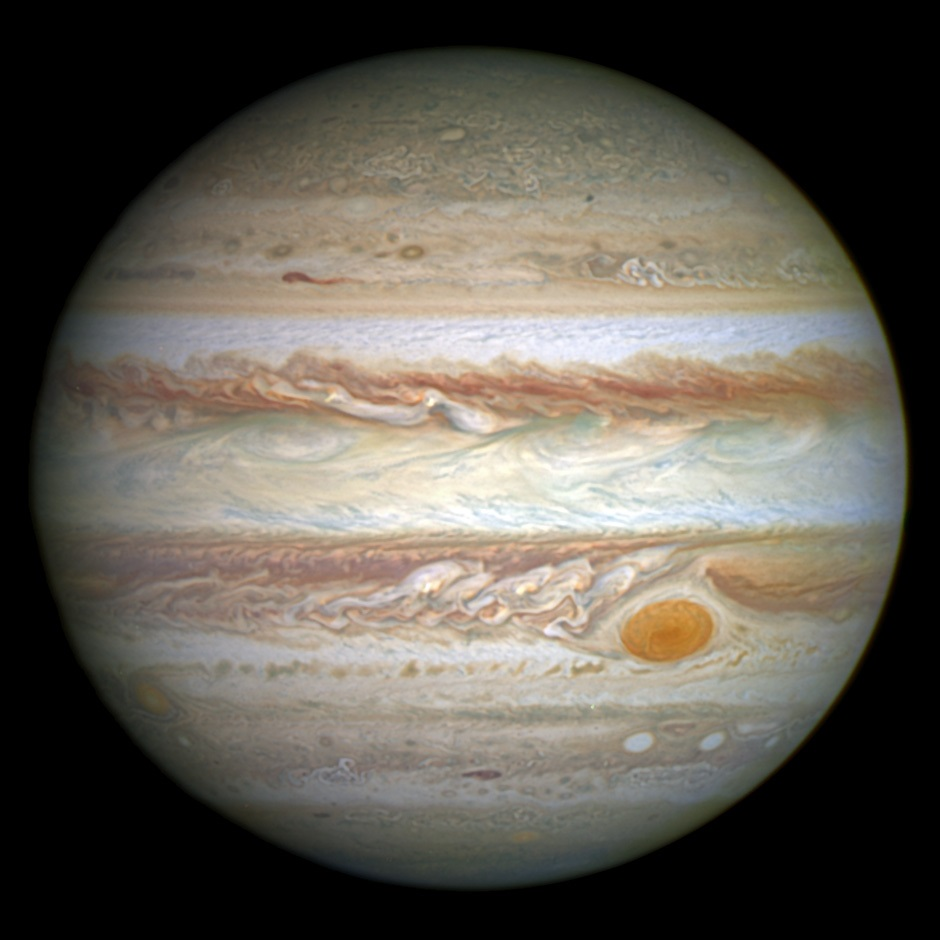
The planet Jupiter.

Jupiter is a given name of Latin origin which is given in reference either to the Roman god Jupiter or to the planet named after the mythological deity.

The name is traditionally masculine but has also been used for girls in recent years. Its use for girls has been attributed to its similarity in sound to the name Juniper, which has increased in popularity for American girls, or to its recent use by Ashley Tisdale and her husband Christopher French for their daughter in 2021 and Ed Sheeran and his wife Cherry Seaborn for their daughter in 2022. The name has also been used for female characters such as Sailor Jupiter in the Japanese manga series Sailor Moon and the 2015 science fiction film Jupiter Ascending. Names from mythology have also increased in popularity for both boys and girls in the United States. It is also in use as a surname.

== Men ==
- Jupiter Bokondji (born 1963), Congolese musician
- Jupiter Ghosh (born 1989), Bangladeshi cricketer
- Jupiter Hammon (1711–1806), American writer viewed as a founder of African-American literature
- Jupiter Mosman, born John Joseph Mosman (1861–1945), Aboriginal Australian prospector
- Jupiter Yves Ngangue (born 1980), Cameroonian former football player

== Surname ==
- Alfred Jupiter (1871–1911), American Negro League pitcher in the 1890s
- Stacy Jupiter (born 1975), Fijian born marine scientist

== See also ==
- Jupiter Apple, English stage name of Brazilian singer, songwriter, multi-instrumentalist and film maker Flávio Basso (1968–2015)
- Leo Jupiter, stage name of Finnish record producer and video artist Leo Salminen
- Self Jupiter, stage name of American rapper Ornette Glenn (born 1970)
- Jupitter, given name of a Brazilian singer
