= Starfucker (disambiguation) =

Starfucker is the original name of the American indie rock band Strfkr.

Starfucker may also refer to:

- Starfucker (Starfucker album), 2008
- Starfucker (Slayyyter album), 2023
- "Starfucker", a song by Finneas from For Cryin' Out Loud!
- "Starfucker", a song by Willam Belli from The Wreckoning
- "St*rfucker", a song by Waterparks from Intellectual Property
- "Star Star", a song by the Rolling Stones that was originally titled "Starfucker"
- "Starfuckers, Inc.", a song by Nine Inch Nails
- Starfuckers, Italian rock band
- Starfuckers, a 2022 short film by Antonio Marziale
