= Jupiter 5 =

Jupiter 5 may refer to:

- Amalthea (moon), the moon of Jupiter, also called "Jupiter V"
- Jupiter Five (short story) story by Arthur C. Clarke
- Jupiter V (aeroplane), see Bristol Jupiter
- Jupiter-5, a model of music synthesizer of the Roland Jupiter

== See also ==
- Jupiter (disambiguation)
