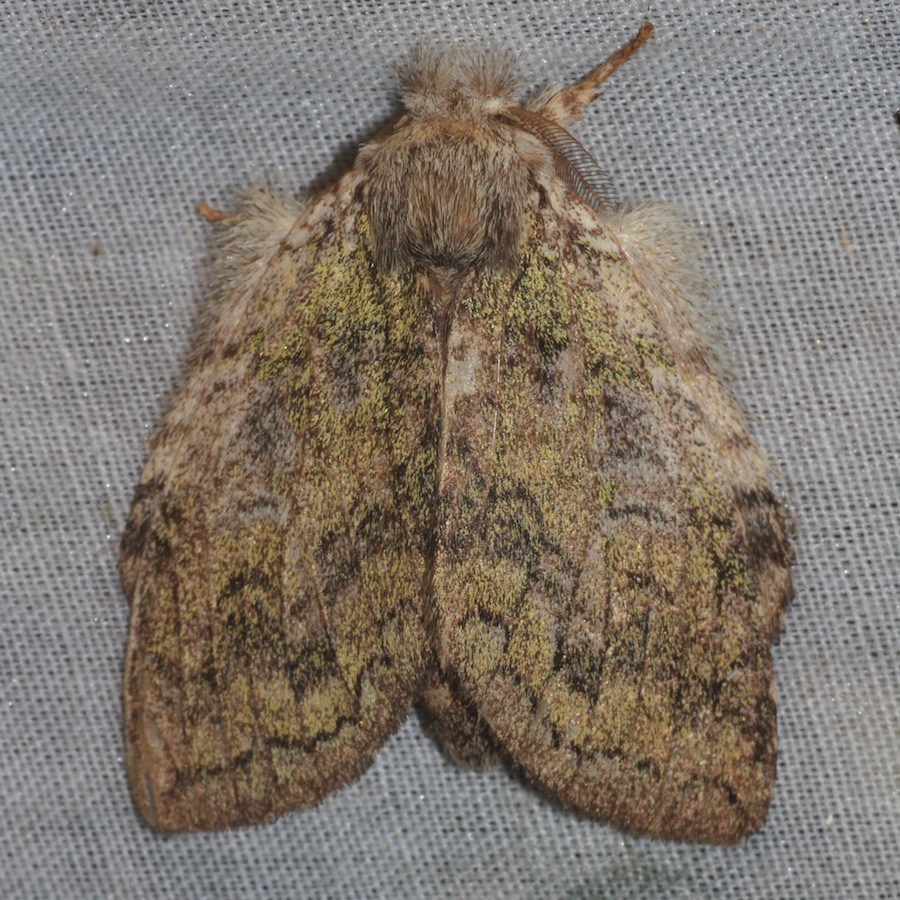
- Female Parasinga lichenina
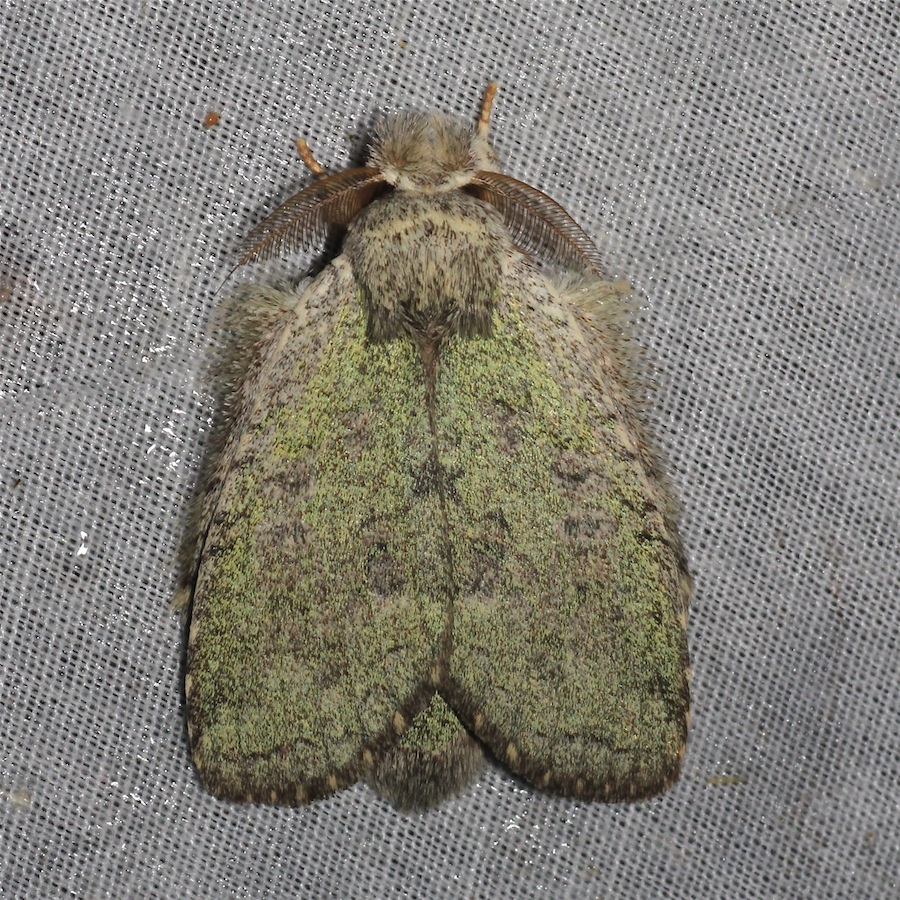
- Male of the same species

Scientific classification
- Kingdom: Animalia
- Phylum: Arthropoda
- Class: Insecta
- Order: Lepidoptera
- Superfamily: Noctuoidea
- Family: Notodontidae
- Genus: Parasinga; Kiriakoff, 1967

Type species
- Parasinga lichenina Butler, 1880

= Parasinga =

Genus of moths

Parasinga is a genus of moths in the family Notodontidae described by Sergius G. Kiriakoff in 1967.

== Characteristics ==
The genus is related to Syntypistis, but its species have deeper shaped wings, which are usually pale greenish or grayish. The antennae are long bipectinated (feather like) except the last 10% until the tip.

== Distribution and habitat ==
The genus is found in the oriental tropics from Sulawesi to Sundaland and Thailand as the most northern point in a wide range of lowland forest types, such as hill dipterocarp, lower montane forest, kerangas, swamp forest and coastal associations.

== Species ==
- Parasinga bicolor (Kiriakoff, 1977)
- Parasinga cinerascens (Kiriakoff, 1974) = Parasinga tuhana (Holloway, 1976)
- Parasinga harmani (Holloway, 1983)
- Parasinga insufficiens (Gaede, 1930) = Quadricalcarifera insufficiens (Gaede 1930)
- Parasinga lichenina (Butler, 1889)
- Parasinga pallidocollis (Kiriakoff, 1967)
- Parasinga subapicalis (Kiriakoff, 1974)
- Parasinga taeniata (Kiriakoff, 1977) = Quadricalcarifera taeniata (Kiriakoff, 1977)
- Parasinga viridescens (Schintlmeister, 1993)
