= Being No One, Going Nowhere =

Studio album by Strfkr
- Released: November 4, 2016
- Genres: Indie rock, electronic, synthpop
- Length: 41:10
- Label: Polyvinyl Records

Strfkr chronology
Miracle Mile (2013)	Being No One, Going Nowhere (2016)	Future Past Life (2020)

Singles from Billboard
- 1. "Never Ever" Released: March 22, 2016; 2. "Tape Machine" Released: August 31, 2016

Professional ratings
Review scores
Source	Rating
AllMusic	4/5 stars
PopMatters	6/10
Soundblab	8/10
Sputnikmusic	3.5/5

Being No One, Going Nowhere is the fifth studio album by the Portland-based indie rock band Strfkr, released on November 4, 2016 on Polyvinyl Records.

== Track listing ==
All music is composed by Strfkr.

No.	Title	Length
1.	"Tape Machine"	3:14
2.	"Satellite"	3:56
3.	"Never Ever"	3:34
4.	"Something Ain't Right"	4:04
5.	"Open Your Eyes"	3:52
6.	"Interspace"	1:10
7.	"In the End"	3:44
8.	"Maps"	4:36
9.	"When I'm With You"	4:33
10.	"Dark Days"	3:42
11.	"Being No One, Going Nowhere"	4:39
Total length:		41:10

== Charts ==
Chart (2017)	Peak position
US Independent Albums (Billboard)	9
US Top Heatseekers Albums (Billboard)	1
