= Future Past Life =

Studio album by STRFKR
- Released: April 10, 2020
- Genre: Indie rock, electronic, synthpop
- Length: 36:06
- Label: Polyvinyl Records

STRFKR chronology
| Being No One, Going Nowhere (2016) | Future Past Life (2020) |

Singles from Future Past Life
- 1. "Never the Same" Released: February 28, 2020; 2. "Deep Dream" Released: March 12, 2020; 3. "Budapest" Released: March 27, 2020

Future Past Life is the sixth studio album by the Portland-based indie rock band STRFKR, released on April 10, 2020, through Polyvinyl Records.

== Background ==
The material that would eventually lay the groundwork for Future Past Life was brought about when principle songwriter Josh Hodges was visiting Amsterdam while working on the band's previous studio album Being No One, Going Nowhere. At the recommendation of a European traveler who was renting his L.A. home while he was abroad, Hodges connected with Mathias Janmat and David Hoogerheide, two similarly inclined musicians in Amsterdam. Within hours of meeting, the three were collaborating on new music together and would continue to do so on multiple occasions during Hodges' stay in the country, recording demos as they went along.

== Recording and composition ==
Eventually Hodges' trip came to an end, but he continued to revisit the songs from the sessions with Janmat and Hoogerheide. Feeling that the songs were "inspired and magical" and using the Amsterdam demos as a blueprint, Strfkr recorded Future Past Life, adding the new layers of the full band's skill and nuance while retaining the core sound of the demo tracks. After moving from L.A. back to Portland, Hodges continued to collaborate with Janmat and Hoogerheiede remotely as he finalized the album in his home studio. The pair also contributed to Tape Machine, which would become the opening track and second single from Being No One, Going Nowhere.

Future Past Life also includes a feature by labelmates Shy Boys, who contribute vocals to the track Budapest. Visual artist and longtime Strfkr collaborator Sohale Kevin Darouian returned to provide the album's artwork, packaging design, and digital visuals.

While answering questions during an AMA on Reddit, the band said the following about Future Past Life:

"Yeah this album we decided to have a few themes we wanted to stick to. One was every song having acoustic guitar on it, 2 was the drums being run through a tape machine to make them a little lofi and squished, the 3rd was that theres a descending melody that is on almost every song."

== Release and promotion ==
Throughout early 2020, Strfkr released three singles from the album with accompanying visualizer videos: Never the Same on February 28, 2020; Deep Dream on March 12, 2020; and Budapest on March 27, 2020. A 7-week tour was scheduled with 34 dates at venues across the United States, though the tour was soon postponed and ultimately cancelled due to the COVID-19 pandemic.

On April 10, 2020, Future Past Life was released at midnight, with the band only announcing the release a few hours beforehand.

== Music and lyrics ==
Following the high-production and polish of their previous installment, Future Past Life utilizes a much more stripped-down and dream-like sound. The album is the first in the band's catalogue to be primarily structured around acoustic guitar, with the usually-frontrunning synth playing a more supportive role. It is evident that the band aimed to capture the same immediacy and roughness that was present in the demo tracks. Lyrically, the album features emotional and dark content regarding abuse and redemption or healing, either based on the band's personal experiences or those they've read about. Heavy lyrics are common in Strfkr's music, though here they are complemented by acoustic sound and are more audible compared to previous, more poppy installments.

== Track listing ==
All music is composed by STRFKR.

| No. | Title | Length |
|---|---|---|
| 1. | "Dear Stranger" | 4:32 |
| 2. | "Never The Same" | 2:30 |
| 3. | "Deep Dream" | 3:40 |
| 4. | "Second Hand" | 3:30 |
| 5. | "Better Together" | 2:14 |
| 6. | "Budapest" | 3:29 |
| 7. | "Palm Reader" | 1:56 |
| 8. | "Sea Foam" | 3:34 |
| 9. | "Pink Noise" | 4:21 |
| 10. | "Cold Comfort" | 5:47 |
| Total length: | | 36:13 |
