= Miracle Mile (Strfkr album) =

Studio album by Strfkr
- Released: February 19, 2013
- Genres: Indie rock; electronic; synth-pop
- Length: 50:40
- Label: Polyvinyl

Strfkr chronology
| Reptilians (2011) | Miracle Mile (2013) | Being No One, Going Nowhere (2016) |

Professional ratings
Aggregate scores
| Source | Rating |
|---|---|
| Metacritic | 67/100 |
Review scores
| Source | Rating |
| AllMusic | 4/5 stars |
| Beats per Minute | 53% |
| Blurt | 2/5 stars 3/5 stars |
| Consequence of Sound | D |
| DIY | 6/10 |
| Filter | 77% |
| Paste | 7.7/10 |
| Pitchfork | 5.2/10 |

Miracle Mile is the fourth studio album by American indie rock band Strfkr, released on February 19, 2013, by Polyvinyl Records.

== Track listing ==
All lyrics are written by Joshua Hodges; all music is composed by Strfkr.

| No. | Title | Length |
|---|---|---|
| 1. | "While I'm Alive" | 3:48 |
| 2. | "Sazed" | 3:24 |
| 3. | "Malmö" | 3:24 |
| 4. | "Beach Monster" | 2:09 |
| 5. | "Isea" | 0:52 |
| 6. | "YAYAYA" | 2:12 |
| 7. | "Fortune's Fool" | 2:05 |
| 8. | "Kahlil Gibran" | 3:59 |
| 9. | "Say to You" | 4:24 |
| 10. | "Atlantis" | 2:29 |
| 11. | "Leave It All Behind" | 3:14 |
| 12. | "I Don't Want to See" | 3:33 |
| 13. | "Last Words" | 2:55 |
| 14. | "Golden Light" | 4:43 |
| 15. | "Nite Rite" | 7:12 |
| Total length: | | 50:40 |

== Charts ==
Chart performance for Miracle Mile
| Chart (2013) | Peak position |
|---|---|
| US Billboard 200 | 178 |
| US Independent Albums (Billboard) | 29 |
| US Heatseekers Albums (Billboard) | 4 |
