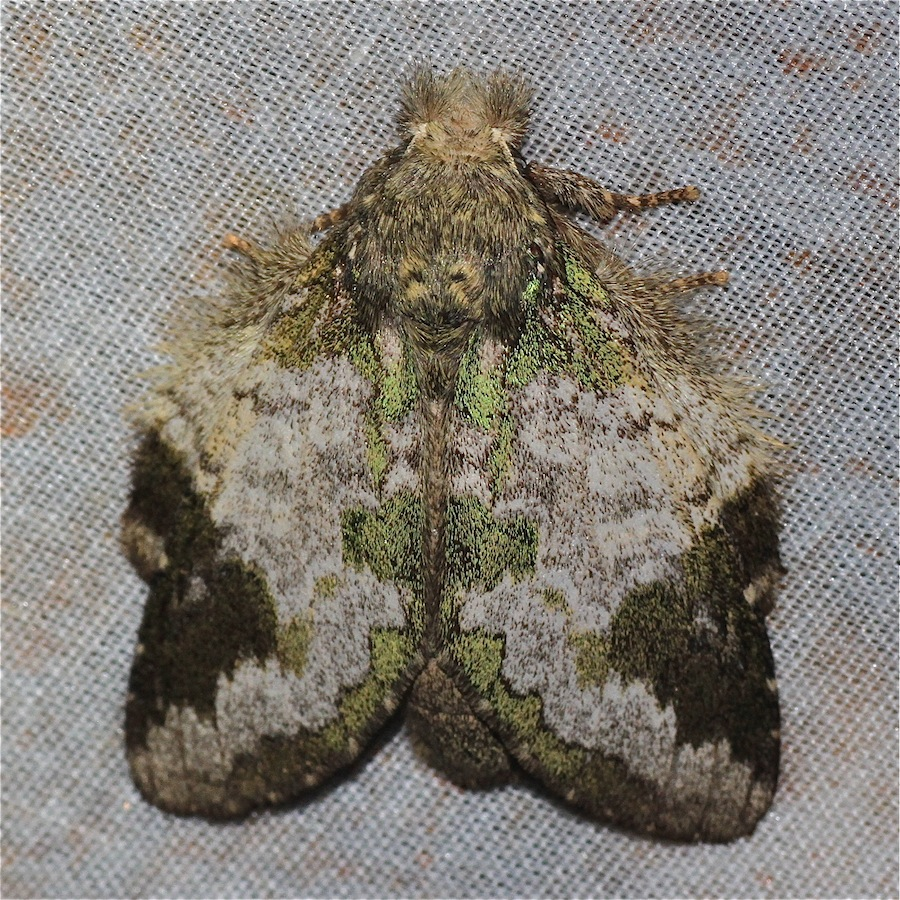
- A female from the lower montane dipterocarp forest of Mount Trusmadi

Scientific classification
- Domain: Eukaryota
- Kingdom: Animalia
- Phylum: Arthropoda
- Class: Insecta
- Order: Lepidoptera
- Superfamily: Noctuoidea
- Family: Notodontidae
- Genus: Syntypistis
- Species: S. palladina

Binomial name
- Syntypistis palladina Schaus, 1928

Synonyms
- Stauropus palladina Schaus, 1928; Quadricalcarifera viridimargo Kiriakoff, 1967

= Syntypistis palladina =

Species of moth

Syntypistis palladina is a species of moth in the family Notodontidae first described by William Schaus in 1928. It is found in Southern Thailand, Sundaland, the Philippines (Palawan and Mindanao). The species prefers lowlands and may be seen the whole year up to 2,000 m.

Jeremy Daniel Holloway synonymized Syntypistis viridimargo and S. palladina, however comparison of genitalia of males from Mindanao and Sundaland revealed significant differences. This indicates that S. viridimargo may be a subspecies of S. palladina.
