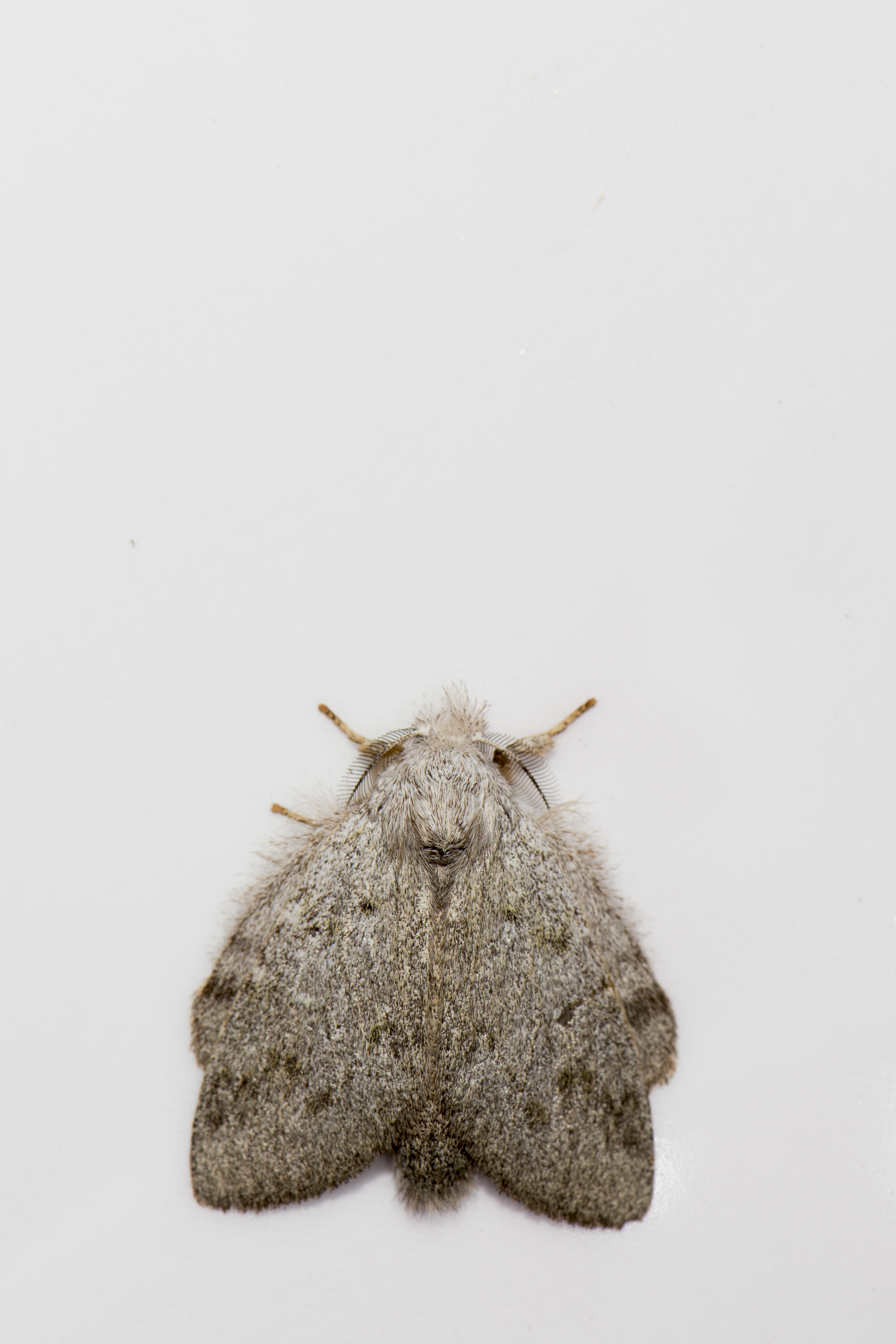

Scientific classification
- Domain: Eukaryota
- Kingdom: Animalia
- Phylum: Arthropoda
- Class: Insecta
- Order: Lepidoptera
- Superfamily: Noctuoidea
- Family: Notodontidae
- Genus: Syntypistis
- Species: S. subgeneris

Binomial name
- Syntypistis subgeneris (Strand, 1915)

Synonyms
- Stauropus subgeneris Strand, 1915; Quadricalcarifera subgeneris; Stauropus pulverulenta Wileman, 1910; Egonocia formosana Marumo, 1920; Stauropus wilemani Matsumura, 1924

= Syntypistis subgeneris =

Species of moth

Syntypistis subgeneris is a species of moth of the family Notodontidae first described by Strand in 1915. It is found in China (Jiangsu, Zhejiang, Anhui, Fujian, Jiangxi, Hunan, Guangdong, Guangxi, Hainan), Taiwan, Japan, Korea, Sikkim and Vietnam.
