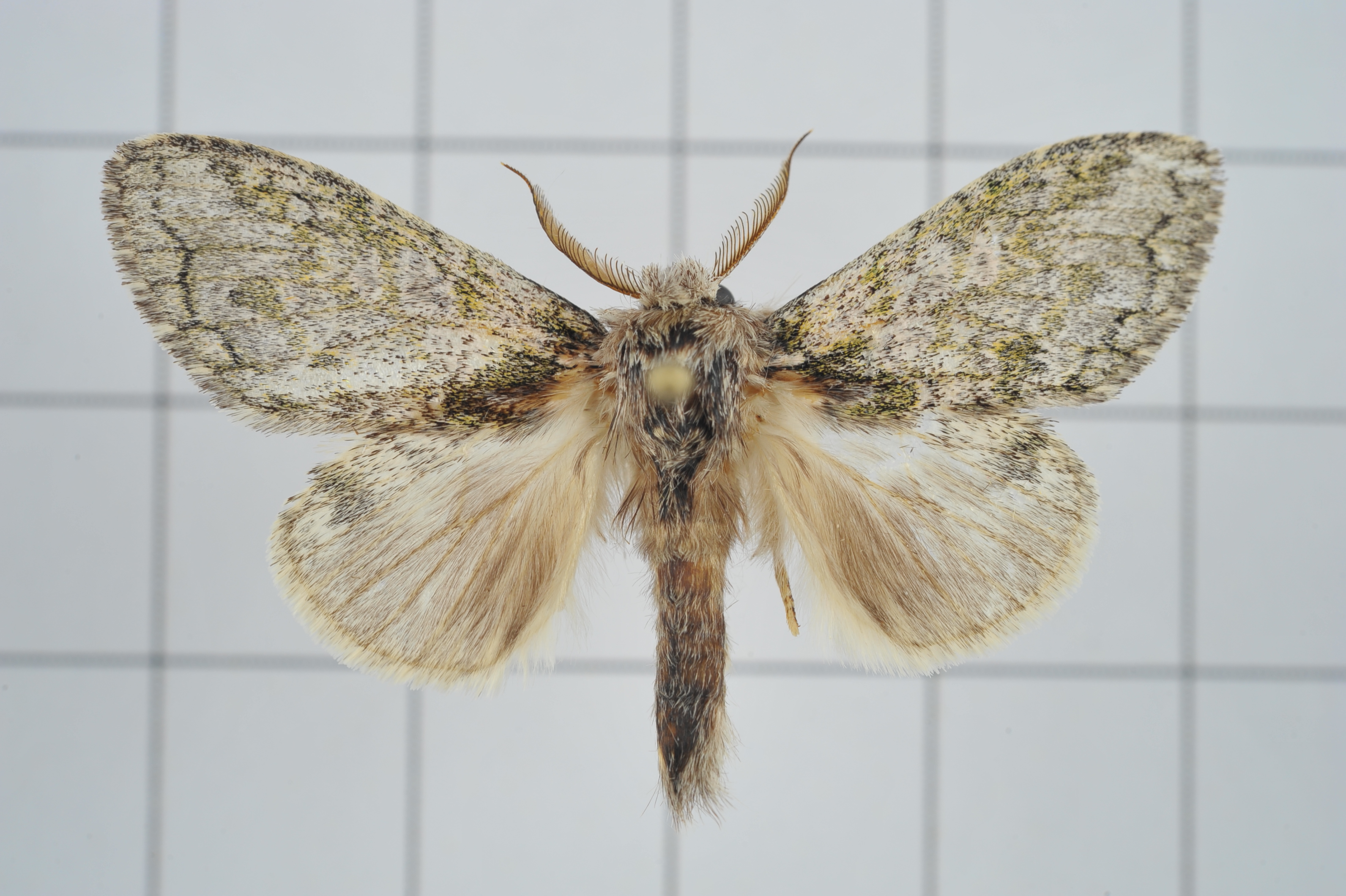

Scientific classification
- Domain: Eukaryota
- Kingdom: Animalia
- Phylum: Arthropoda
- Class: Insecta
- Order: Lepidoptera
- Superfamily: Noctuoidea
- Family: Notodontidae
- Genus: Syntypistis
- Species: S. pryeri

Binomial name
- Syntypistis pryeri (Leech, 1889)

Synonyms
- Somera pryeri Leech, 1889; Quadricalcarifera pryeri; Stauropus lama Oberthür, 1911

= Syntypistis pryeri =

Species of moth

Syntypistis pryeri is a species of moth of the family Notodontidae first described by John Henry Leech in 1889. It is found in China (Zhejiang, Fujian, Hubei, Hunan, Guangxi, Sichuan, Yunnan, Shaanxi, Gansu), Taiwan, Korea and Japan.
