= Syntypistis defector =

Scientific classification
- Domain: Eukaryota
- Kingdom: Animalia
- Phylum: Arthropoda
- Class: Insecta
- Order: Lepidoptera
- Superfamily: Noctuoidea
- Family: Notodontidae
- Genus: Syntypistis
- Species: S. defector

Binomial name
- Syntypistis defector (Schintlmeister, 1997)

Synonyms
- Quadricalcarifera defector Schintlmeister, 1997

Species of moth

Syntypistis defector is a species of moth of the family Notodontidae first described by Alexander Schintlmeister in 1997. It is found in China (Yunnan) and Vietnam.
