= Reptilians (Starfucker album) =

Studio album by Starfucker
- Released: March 8, 2011
- Genres: Indie rock; electronic; synth-pop
- Length: 40:06
- Label: Polyvinyl Records
- Producers: Josh Hodges; Jacob Portrait

Starfucker chronology
Jupiter (2009)	Reptilians (2011)	Miracle Mile (2013)

Singles from Reptilians
- 1. "Julius" Released: September 14, 2010; 2. "Bury Us Alive" Released: January 6, 2011

Reptilians is the third studio album by the American electronic indie rock band Strfkr. Departing from the light feel of their previous work, Jupiter (2009), the twelve-track Reptilians includes lyrics by Joshua Hodges about death and the end of the world, while musically not sounding depressing. One of the ways these theories are supported is using samples of British-American philosopher Alan Watts in some of the tracks.

Finished in November 2010 and released on March 8, 2011 by Polyvinyl Records, two singles were issued from Reptilians, which was "Julius" in late 2010 and "Bury Us Alive" in January 2011. Upon its release, the album earned mostly positive reviews from music critics, with praise going towards the band's development from their previous records and re-listening value. On the American Billboard Top Heatseekers chart, it entered at number 26.

== Production and composition ==
Josh Hodges discussed coming up with Reptilians as the title of the album:

"Sometimes I get sucked into the rabbit hole of watching conspiracy videos all night. One of the theories is that there's an alien race that are called Reptilians that control the human race and like to make them their slaves. It's pretty wild. That's where the name came from. And the album is loosely about the end of the world and death so it seemed to be fitting. We had some other ideas – and I always like to have a song that is the title track – and that song was already called "Reptilians" so we just thought it was perfect."

Reptilians was produced and engineered by Hodges and Jake Portrait. Hodges wrote a half or more of the material on tour with his laptop, and the rest in his bedroom. On tour, he wrote his songs with a MIDI keyboard and added live instruments when he got home. He also used an old analog drum machine in the process. Production of the record ended on November 18, 2010.

Ryan Biornstad said the group wanted to depart from the light feel of their previous album Jupiter, because "we're at a point now where we're getting older and touring a lot, and we're staying true to what we feel is our sound, and it's growing, and it's evolving, and we're not interested in making an album that's just like the first one. We're making it as an evolution." Hodges' lyrics in the songs from Reptilians mainly deal with death and the end of the world, inspired by his grandmother's passing, but musically, the tracks sound "not the slightest bit depressing", as explained in a press release by Polyvinyl Records. Starfucker believed death is responsible for giving meaning to life, which is expressed in the record using snippets of British-American philosopher Alan Watts talking about the band's same beliefs about death, over "vibrant crescendos, explosive drum beats, and layered synth melodies that drive a theatrical live show where dance party meets Roxy Music." Krystina Nellis of Drowned in Sound said that by the second half of the record's fourth track, "Mystery Cloud", these philosophies became "basically a more morbid version of" "Everybody's Free (To Wear Sunscreen)" by Baz Luhrmann.

== Tracks ==
The original issue of Reptilians has twelve tracks: "Born", "Julius", "Bury Us Alive", "Mystery Cloud", "Death as a Fetish", "Astoria", "Reptilians", "The White of Noon", "Hungry Ghost", "Mona Vegas", "Millions" and "Quality Time". MusicOMH compared the titles of the songs to later horror stories by Stephen King. The first half of the album is faster-tempo'd, opening with the "rhythmic rock-like anthem" "Born", a track that is introduced with "chattering voices and tinny guitars, quickly overwhelmed by a shuddering wash of electronics." "Processed beats, flickering synths and warming harmonized vocals" are also present. "Julius" follows, and has "chime-y bells" and warbled bass included in its instrumentation. The 1980s-synthpop-style "twinkling tunnel" of "Bury Us Alive" is arranged with "Blaring MIDI'd-to-death horns", "dance beats" and "reverberated keyboards". It lyrically "drills the idea that death isn’t something to be feared, but to be viewed as a release." "Mystery Cloud", according to The Aquarian Weekly critic Roz Smith, "sounds like something out of Mario Kart 64", and ends with Alan Watts talking "about how death can be used for creativity." "Death as a Fetish" is lyrically similar to "Bury Us Alive", as it also talks about how death shouldn't be feared.

The second half of Reptilians becomes toned down and more mid-tempo. "Astoria" is an instrumental, which Hodges said comes from how he fantasizes "about leaving everything and being a hermit and having a calm little life in a place like [a house in a coastal town].' The song has its bassline taken from the song "Blue Monday" by English rock band New Order. "Reptilians" opens with an acoustic guitar before it "moves into a realm filled with explosive drum hits, synths and a bass line". The "swirling chill-pop" “The White of Noon” has a "spaced-out synth" loop and a "tamed distorted guitar effect in the middle". The psychedelic "Hungry Ghosts", another swirling chill-pop song, features "hazy rhythms". Having a "midnight 80’s feel", "Mona Vegas" was described by Smith as "a lonely version of a love song." The jaunty "Millions" is a punchy, upbeat song with Nintendo-style synths. Opening with bleeps, a bass line then comes in before a synth line plays in the hook. "Quality Time" closes Reptilians, and is another song that opens with a snippet from Alan Watts, before going into "a head banging techno style dance track." Drowned in Sound's Krystina Nellis noted the backing track similar to an Atari game.

== Release and artwork ==
The cover art for Reptilians was illustrated and designed one of the group's friends, Sohale Kevin Darouian. Hodges said that he asked Darouian to make the artwork similar to "an old '70s sci-fi book cover or something. I didn't give him too much direction besides that." The unrefined demos of Reptilians were released on April 21, 2012 under the title Heaven's Youth, the original planned title for Reptilians, with a re-working of the artwork.

On March 8, 2021, in celebration of the album's 10-year anniversary, Reptilians was re-released as a remastered deluxe reissue. The 10-Year Anniversary Edition included digitally-enhanced versions of the album's original twelve songs, the two bonus tracks found on the previous Deluxe Edition, and two newly-added bonus tracks from the same time period (one of which being Helium Muffin, previously released as a b-side with the Julius single). The remasters were completed by Mile Nolte at Eureka Mastering, and Darouian returned to provide a revamped version of his artwork for the album cover.

== Singles ==
On September 14, 2010, Polyvinyl Records released "Julius" as the lead single from Reptilians, with "Helium Muffin" being its b-side. The release was first announced on August 25, 2010. "Bury Us Alive" was the second single off the record, coming out on January 6, 2011.

== Critical reception ==
Professional ratings
Aggregate scores
Source	Rating
Metacritic	71/100
Review scores
Source	Rating
AllMusic	3.5/5 stars
The A.V. Club	A
Beats per Minute	61%
Drowned in Sound	6/10
Filter	73%
musicOMH	3/5 stars
Pitchfork	6.5/10
Popmatters	6/10
Spin	7/10
Under the Radar	6/10 stars

Reptilians earned mixed to positive critical reviews upon release. Based on twelve critics, the album holds an aggregate score of 71 out of 100 on Metacritic, indicating "Generally favorable reviews". It earned an A grade from The A.V. Club's Marc Hawthrone, who described it as equally "important, fun, and urgent," concluding that "it’s hard to think of a better combination of attributes for a pop record." Another A-grade review came from Roz Smith of The Aquarian Weekly, saying that "The way the beats clash with the lyrics throughout this piece is ironic yet enjoyable." Jason Lymangrover of AllMusic awarded the record three-and-a-half stars out of five, writing that "There aren’t any weak points, and it drifts along dreamily, from one understated jam to the next." Spin writer Marc Hogan called it Starfucker's best studio effort so far, scoring it a seven out of ten, while Larry Fitzmaurice, in a 6.5-out-of-ten review for Pitchfork, found it a "pretty good album." Lily Moayeri, rating it six stars out of ten, opened her review for Under the Radar with, "There is a whole class of synth-obsessed electro/dance/pop groups that sound like they had MGMT's Benjamin Goldwasser and Andrew VanWyngarden as their professors in rock star college. Newest graduate from this school is Starfucker. The Portland, Oregon-based band's second album, Reptilians, indicates it graduated with high honors." In an article for Drowned in Sound, Krystina Nellis gave a verdict that there was more positives than negatives on the album, calling it "a fun album with some great songs you can both dance to and listen to and, in its first three tracks, some excellent pop singles."

More varied reviews were focused on the group's lack of maturity, originally and lack of value for repeated listens. In their three-star review, MusicOMH called it "a good listen but not something that will be anyone's favourite album." Dylan Nelson, a PopLocal Features Editor for Popmatters, awarded it a six out of ten, finding it "quite promising" but also disliking how "noisy and overwrought" it was. Giving it a percentage of 61, Beats per Minute author Ray Finlayson said that "I know the band can write damn good songs and they have proven that before and prove it here, but until they address the main problems ... or really venture out into something different... I think history will keep repeating itself for these guys." Kenny S. McGuane of Filter dismissed the record, writing that "With no standout tracks, Reptilians just becomes 40 minutes of innocuous, digital background music that’s been done before."

== Track listing ==
All lyrics are written by Joshua Hodges; all music is composed by Starfucker.

No.	Title	Length
1.	"Born"	3:23
2.	"Julius"	3:48
3.	"Bury Us Alive"	3:10
4.	"Mystery Cloud"	4:25
5.	"Death as a Fetish"	4:14
6.	"Astoria"	2:42
7.	"Reptilians"	2:48
8.	"The White of Noon"	4:25
9.	"Hungry Ghost"	2:09
10.	"Mona Vegas"	3:38
11.	"Millions"	2:34
12.	"Quality Time"	2:57
Total length:		40:06

=== Deluxe Edition bonus tracks ===
No.	Title	Length
13.	"Slow Dance"	3:44
14.	"Recess Time"	2:21
Total length:		46:11

=== 10-Year Anniversary Edition bonus tracks ===
No.	Title	Length
15.	"Helium Muffin"	4:57
16.	"The Wisdom of Insecurity"	2:57
Total length:		54:20

== Credits ==
Credits are adapted from AllMusic.

- Performer – Starfucker
- Songwriting, production, engineering – Joshua Hodges
- Featured artist – Mattress
- Production, engineering, mixing – Jake Portrait
- Additional music – Keil Corcoran, Randy Bemrose
- Mastering – Carl Saff
- Artwork – Sohale Kevin Darouian

== Charts ==
Chart (2011)	Peak position
US Heatseekers Albums (Billboard)	26
