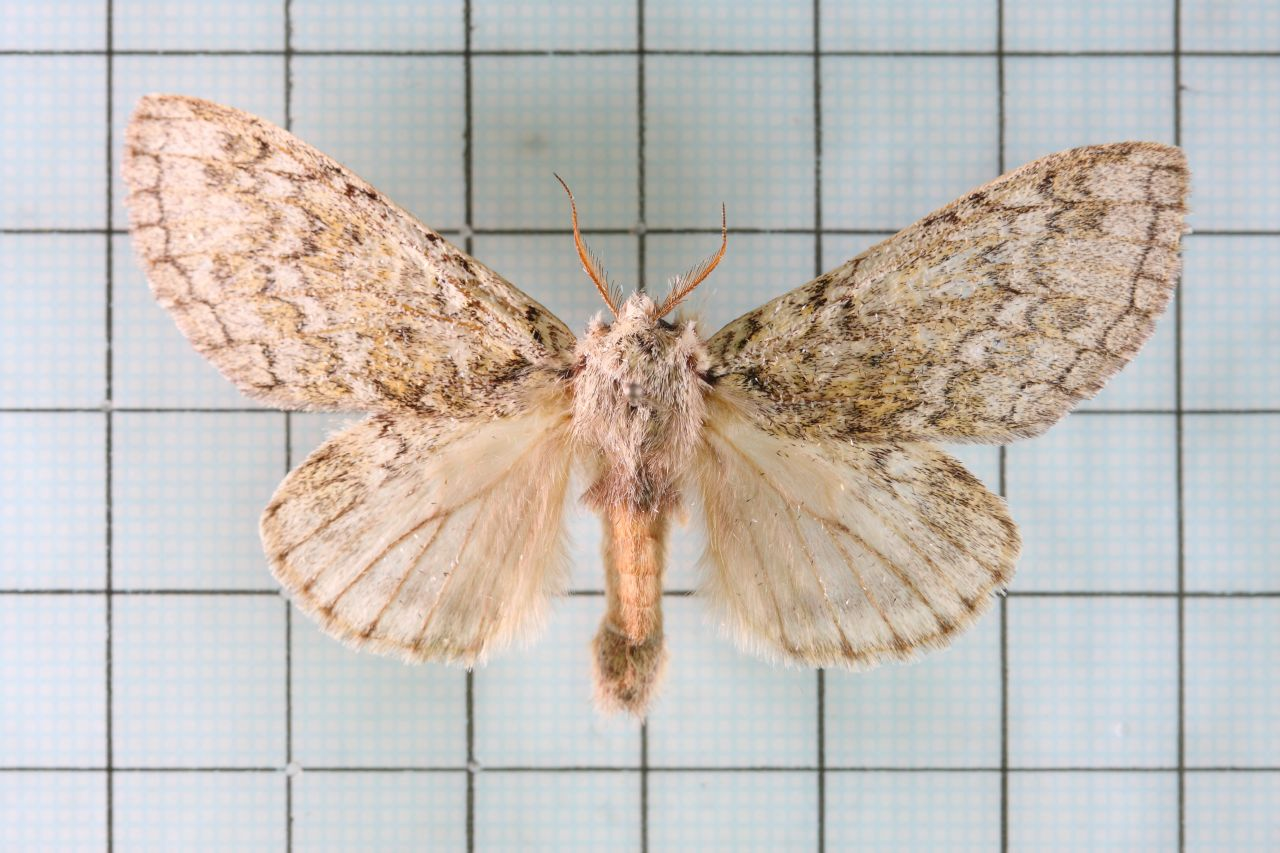

Scientific classification
- Domain: Eukaryota
- Kingdom: Animalia
- Phylum: Arthropoda
- Class: Insecta
- Order: Lepidoptera
- Superfamily: Noctuoidea
- Family: Notodontidae
- Genus: Syntypistis
- Species: S. perdix

Binomial name
- Syntypistis perdix (Moore, 1879)

Synonyms
- Dasychira perdix Moore, 1879; Stauropus confusa Wileman, 1910; Cnethodonta horishana Matsumura, 1920; Quadricalcarifera kikuchii Matsumura, 1927; Quadricalcarifera gutianshana J. K. Yang, 1995

= Syntypistis perdix =

Species of moth

Syntypistis perdix is a moth of the family Notodontidae first described by Frederic Moore in 1879. It is found in China, Taiwan, India, Nepal, Thailand and Vietnam.

== Subspecies ==
- Syntypistis perdix perdix (Yunnan, northern India, Nepal, Thailand, Vietnam)
- Syntypistis perdix gutianshana (J. K. Yang, 1995) (Zheijang, Fujian, Hunan, Guangdong, Guangxi, Hainan, Taiwan)
