= Ryu Goto =

Ryu Goto 五嶋 龍
- Born: July 13, 1988 (age 38); New York City, New York, United States
- Occupations: Violinist, karateka, karate teacher
- Instrument: Violin
- Label: Deutsche Grammophon

Ryu Goto (五嶋 龍, Gotō Ryū; born July 13, 1988) is an American violinist and karateka. Goto gained attention as a child prodigy, first performing at the age of seven in the Pacific Music Festival held in Sapporo, Japan. In 2006, his debut tour of 12 cities of Japan was sold out.

== Early life ==
Goto's mother is a violinist. His elder (by 17 years) half-sister, Midori, is an internationally renowned violinist. Goto began playing violin at age three. He credits his mother for both his and his half-sister's success as musicians.

== Career ==
Goto has performed internationally as a soloist with the London Symphony Orchestra, the Orpheus Chamber Orchestra, the Shanghai Philharmonic, the U.S. National Symphony Orchestra, the London Philharmonic Orchestra, the Toscanini Symphonica in Italy, the New Zealand Symphony Orchestra, the Bamberg Symphony, New Symphony Orchestra (Bulgaria), the European Union Youth Orchestra, Vancouver Symphony Orchestra, and the KZN Philharmonic Orchestra of South Africa Ryu has performed in such prestigious venues as Carnegie Hall, Kennedy Center, Tokyo Suntory Hall, Sydney Opera House, Shanghai Grand Theater, Taipei National Concert Hall, Vienna Musikverein, Munich's Herkulessaal and the Philharmonic Hall Gasteig. He is now a karateka and karate teacher. He has a dojo in Manhattan, New York, NY,

Goto performed at the World Trade Center site during the official September 11 commemoration ceremony in 2003 and at the peace memorial concerts in Hiroshima and Nagasaki in 2005. In 2005, Universal Music signed Goto to its Deutsche Grammophon label. In 2009, Goto played with the Ditto Ensemble in Korea, and was scheduled to appear with them in the summer of 2010 in Japan. In 2010, he made his Carnegie Hall debut. In 2014, he appeared to represent Japan at the Festival Internacional Cervantino in Mexico.

Goto graduated from Harvard University with a BA in Physics in 2011. He regularly played with the Bach Society Orchestra.

He has practiced Shotokan-ryu karate since the age of seven and holds a third-degree black belt certified by the Japan Karate Association. During the COVID-19 pandemic, he stepped away from his career as a violinist and became active as a karateka, while also running the Japanese American Budokan karate dojo. In a 2026 interview, he said that the possibility of returning to his career as a violinist was "zero" and described his current path as "an adventure to find myself again."

== Playing style ==
Goto has been influenced by electric guitarists such as Jimi Hendrix, and sometimes uses an aggressive playing style described as "ferocious" or "fiery."

== Instrument ==
Goto plays the 1722 Stradivarius "Jupiter, ex-Goding" violin on loan to him from Nippon Music Foundation since December 2013. Formerly, Midori also played it.

== Personal life ==
Goto has a black belt in karate, and holds a degree in physics from Harvard (2011), where he is a member of the Phoenix SK Club. He also plays guitar. In addition to classical he likes jazz, pop and electronic music.

== Discography ==
DVD

- Ryu Goto, Brahms Violin Concerto in D Major Op.77 – May 2006
- Ryu Goto, Violin Recital 2006 – March 2007

CD/Digital

- Ryu – July 2005
- Ryu Goto, Violin Recital 2006 – January 2007
- Live in Suntory Hall 2004 – August 2007
- The Four Seasons – June 2009
