= Syntypistis spitzeri =

Scientific classification
- Domain: Eukaryota
- Kingdom: Animalia
- Phylum: Arthropoda
- Class: Insecta
- Order: Lepidoptera
- Superfamily: Noctuoidea
- Family: Notodontidae
- Genus: Syntypistis
- Species: S. spitzeri

Binomial name
- Syntypistis spitzeri (Schintlmeister, 1987)

Synonyms
- Quadricalcarifera spitzeri Schintlmeister, 1987

Species of moth

Syntypistis spitzeri is a species of moth of the family Notodontidae first described by Alexander Schintlmeister in 1987. It is found in Vietnam and the Chinese provinces of Jiangxi, Guangxi, and Yunnan.
