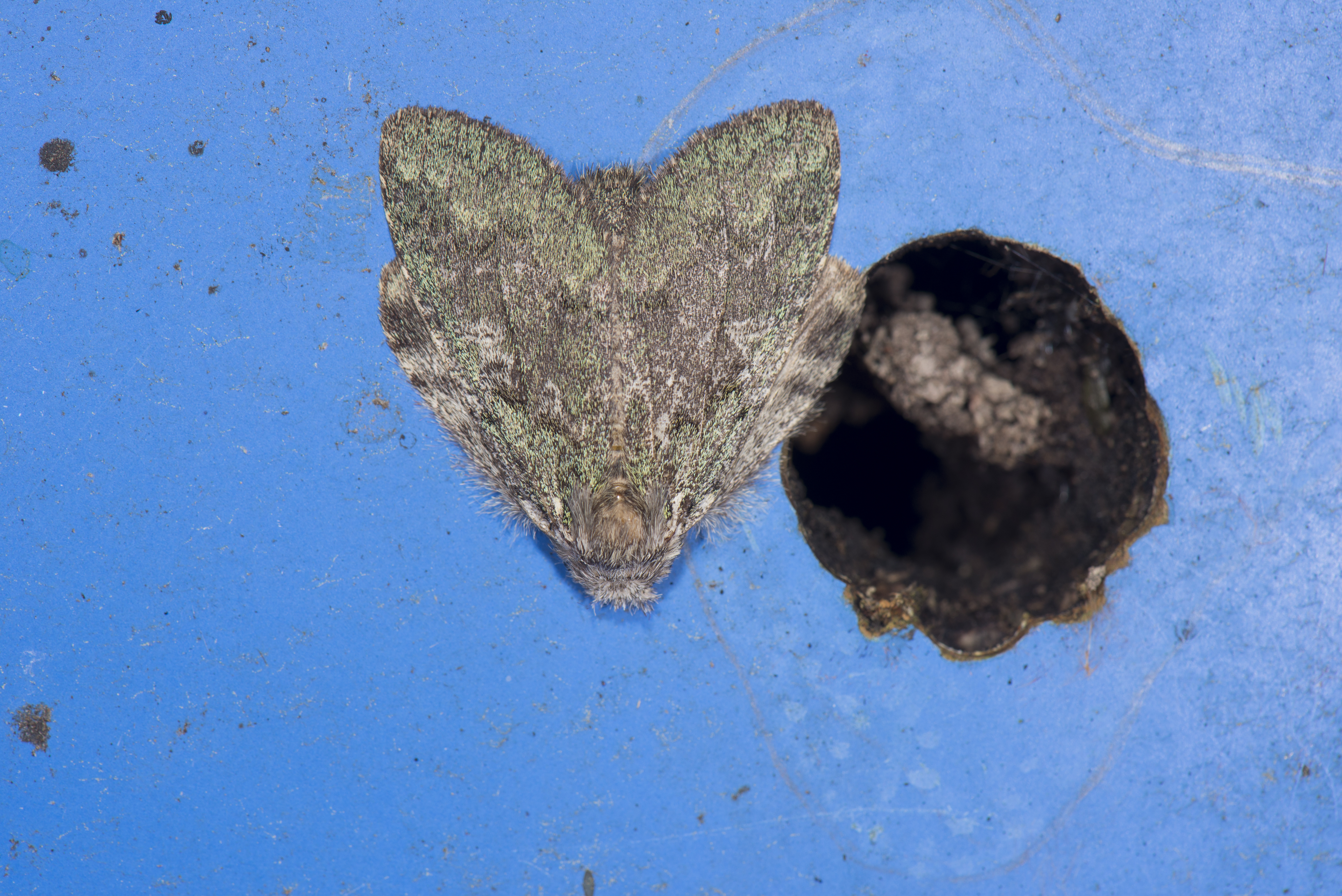

Scientific classification
- Domain: Eukaryota
- Kingdom: Animalia
- Phylum: Arthropoda
- Class: Insecta
- Order: Lepidoptera
- Superfamily: Noctuoidea
- Family: Notodontidae
- Genus: Syntypistis
- Species: S. cyanea

Binomial name
- Syntypistis cyanea (Leech, 1889)

Synonyms
- Somera cyanea Leech, 1889; Quadricalcarifera cyanea; Quadricalcarifera fransciscana Kiriakoff, 1963

= Syntypistis cyanea =

Species of moth

Syntypistis cyanea is a species of moth of the family Notodontidae first described by John Henry Leech in 1889. It is found in China (Zhejiang, Fujian, Jiangxi, Guangdong, Yunnan), Taiwan, Japan, Korea and Vietnam.
