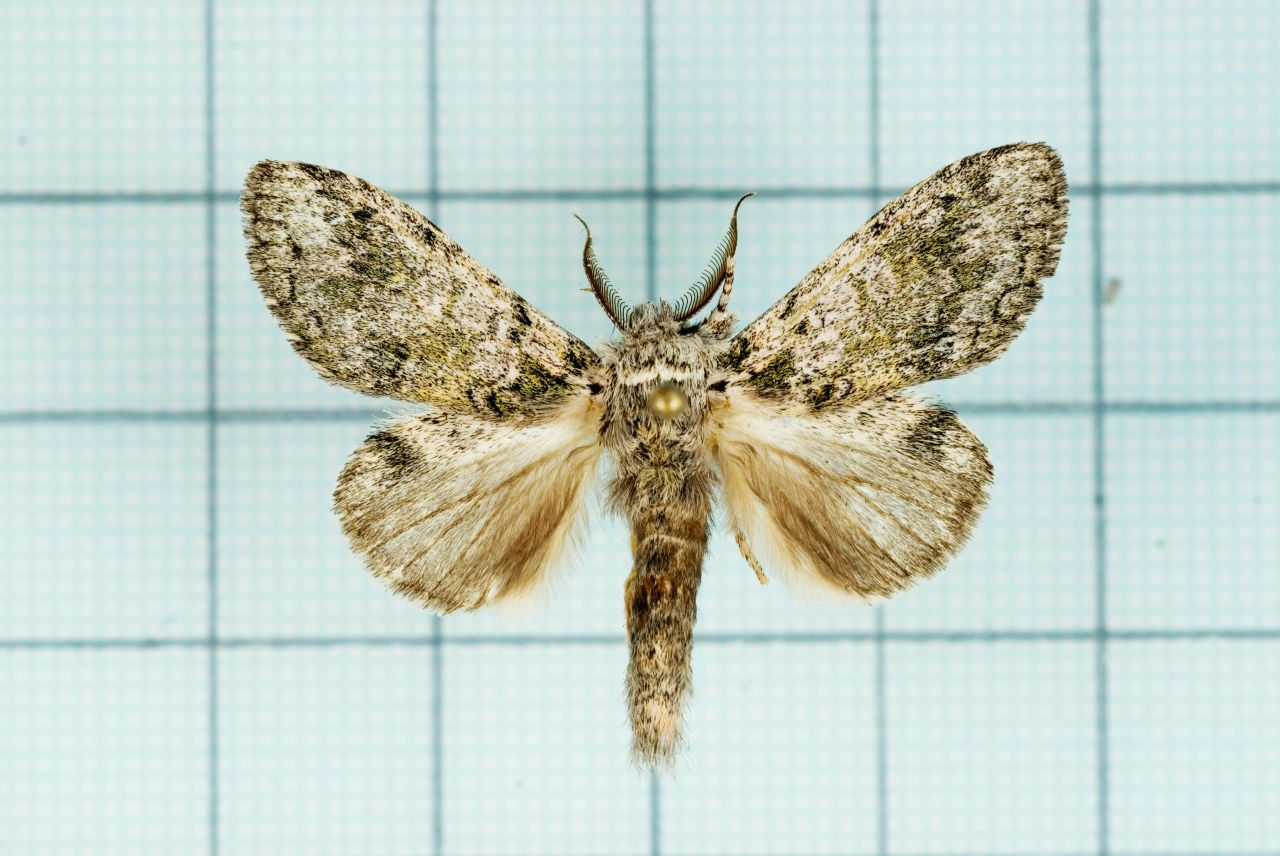

Scientific classification
- Kingdom: Animalia
- Phylum: Arthropoda
- Clade: Pancrustacea
- Class: Insecta
- Order: Lepidoptera
- Superfamily: Noctuoidea
- Family: Notodontidae
- Genus: Syntypistis
- Species: S. umbrosa

Binomial name
- Syntypistis umbrosa (Matsumura, 1927)

Synonyms
- Quadricalcarifera umbrosa Matsumura, 1927; Desmeocraera okurai Okano, 1960

= Syntypistis umbrosa =

Species of moth

Syntypistis umbrosa is a species of moth of the family Notodontidae first described by Shōnen Matsumura in 1927. It is found in India, China (Fujian, Guangdong, Guangxi, Hainan, Sichuan, Yunnan), Taiwan, Myanmar, Malaysia, Indonesia and Vietnam.
