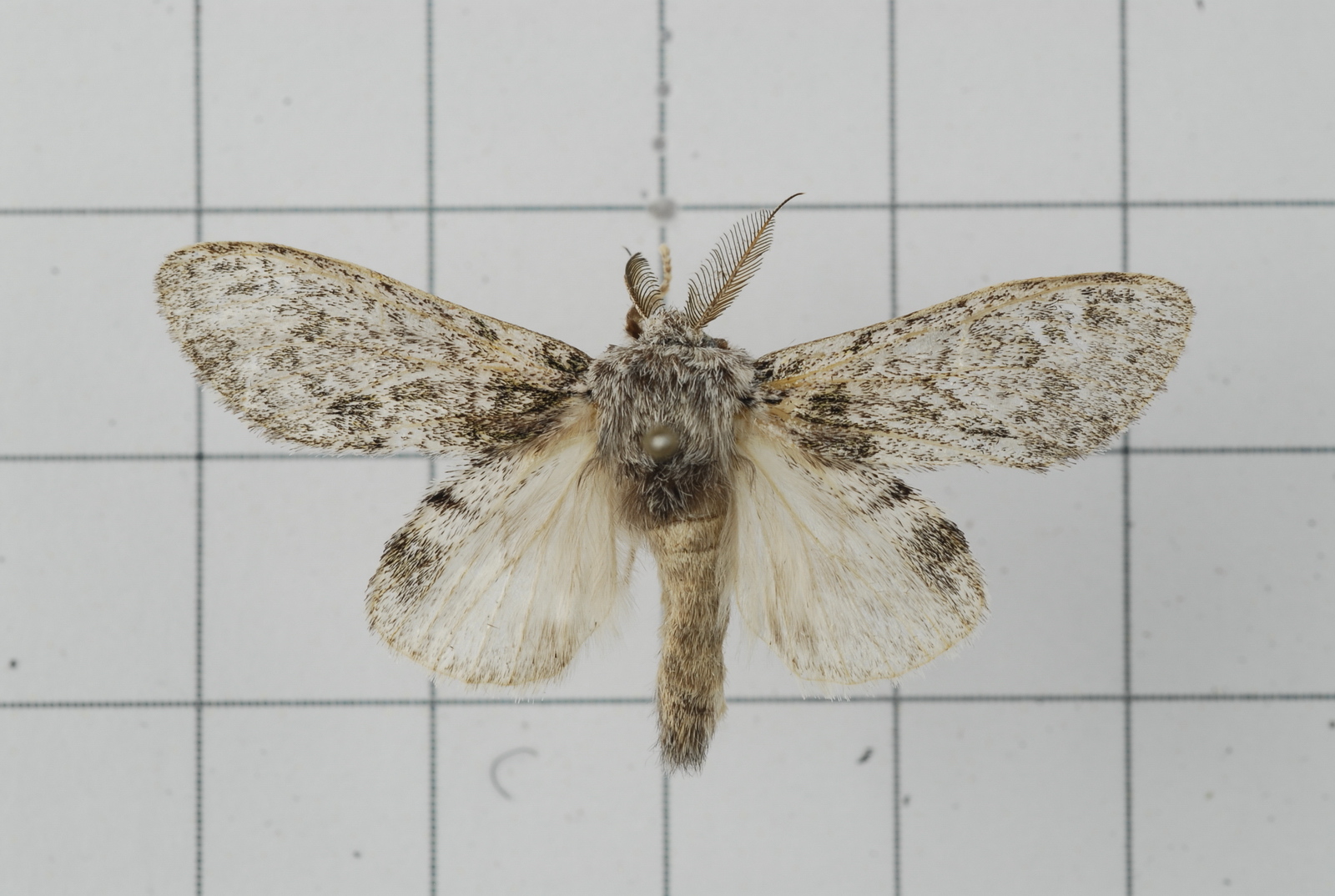

Scientific classification
- Domain: Eukaryota
- Kingdom: Animalia
- Phylum: Arthropoda
- Class: Insecta
- Order: Lepidoptera
- Superfamily: Noctuoidea
- Family: Notodontidae
- Genus: Syntypistis
- Species: S. nigribasalis

Binomial name
- Syntypistis nigribasalis (Wileman, 1910)

Synonyms
- Stauropus nigribasalis Wileman, 1910; Quadricalcarifera notoprocta Yang, 1995; Desmeocraera saitonis Matsumura, 1927; Quadricalcarifera nigribasalis tropica Kiriakoff, 1974

= Syntypistis nigribasalis =

Species of moth

Syntypistis nigribasalis is a species of moth of the family Notodontidae first described by Wileman in 1910. It is found in Taiwan, Vietnam, Thailand, Indonesia, Malaysia and the Chinese provinces of Zhejiang, Fujian, Jiangxi, Guangxi and Guizhou.
