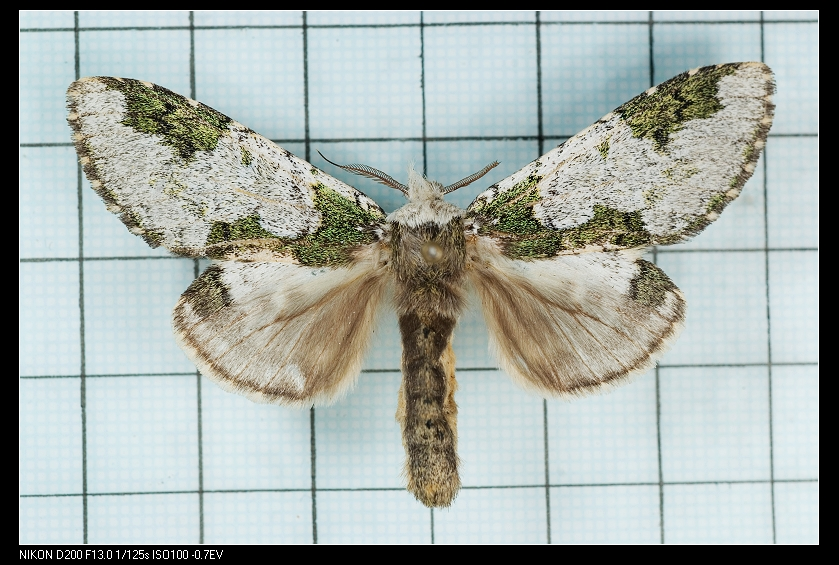

Scientific classification
- Domain: Eukaryota
- Kingdom: Animalia
- Phylum: Arthropoda
- Class: Insecta
- Order: Lepidoptera
- Superfamily: Noctuoidea
- Family: Notodontidae
- Genus: Syntypistis
- Species: S. comatus

Binomial name
- Syntypistis comatus (Leech, 1898)

Synonyms
- Stauropus comatus Leech, 1898; Quadricalcarifera comatus; Quadricalcarifera viridimacula Matsumura, 1922; Quadricalcarifera bioculata Kiriakoff, 1967

= Syntypistis comatus =

Species of moth

Syntypistis comatus is a species of moth of the family Notodontidae first described by John Henry Leech in 1898. It is found in China, Taiwan, India, Myanmar, Thailand, Vietnam, Malaysia, Indonesia the Philippines and New Guinea.

The larvae feed on Pterocarya stenoptera.
