= USS Jupiter =

Two ships of the United States Navy have been named USS Jupiter:

- USS Jupiter (AC-3) served as a collier from 1913 to 1920 and was converted into the U.S. Navy's first aircraft carrier, being renamed USS Langley on 21 April 1920 and being recommissioned as an aircraft carrier in 1922.
- USS Jupiter (AK-43), a cargo ship commissioned 22 August 1942 . Re-designated as an aviation Stores Issue Ship (AVS-8), 31 July 1945. and scrapped in March 1971

== See also ==
- Jupiter (disambiguation)
