= Syntypistis subgriseoviridis =

Scientific classification
- Domain: Eukaryota
- Kingdom: Animalia
- Phylum: Arthropoda
- Class: Insecta
- Order: Lepidoptera
- Superfamily: Noctuoidea
- Family: Notodontidae
- Genus: Syntypistis
- Species: S. subgriseoviridis

Binomial name
- Syntypistis subgriseoviridis (Kiriakoff, 1963)

Synonyms
- Quadricalcarifera subgriseoviridis Kiriakoff, 1963

Species of moth

Syntypistis subgriseoviridis is a species of moth of the family Notodontidae first described by Sergius G. Kiriakoff in 1963. It is found in the Chinese provinces of Jiangsu, Zhejiang, Jiangxi, Hubei, Hunan, Guangxi, Sichuan, Shaanxi and Gansu.

The larvae feed on Carya cathayensis.
