= Syntypistis cupreonitens =

Scientific classification
- Domain: Eukaryota
- Kingdom: Animalia
- Phylum: Arthropoda
- Class: Insecta
- Order: Lepidoptera
- Superfamily: Noctuoidea
- Family: Notodontidae
- Genus: Syntypistis
- Species: S. cupreonitens

Binomial name
- Syntypistis cupreonitens (Kiriakoff, 1963)

Synonyms
- Quadricalcarifera cupreonitens Kiriakoff, 1963

Species of moth

Syntypistis cupreonitens is a species of moth of the family Notodontidae first described by Sergius G. Kiriakoff in 1963. It is found in the Chinese provinces of Zhejiang, Jiangxi and Guangdong and in Vietnam.
