= Syntypistis ambigua =

Scientific classification
- Kingdom: Animalia
- Phylum: Arthropoda
- Clade: Pancrustacea
- Class: Insecta
- Order: Lepidoptera
- Superfamily: Noctuoidea
- Family: Notodontidae
- Genus: Syntypistis
- Species: S. ambigua

Binomial name
- Syntypistis ambigua Schintlmeister & C. L. Fang, 2001

Species of moth

Syntypistis ambigua is a species of moth of the family Notodontidae first described by Alexander Schintlmeister and Cheng-Lai Fang in 2001. It is found in China (Hubei, Hunan, Guangxi, Sichuan) and northern Vietnam.
