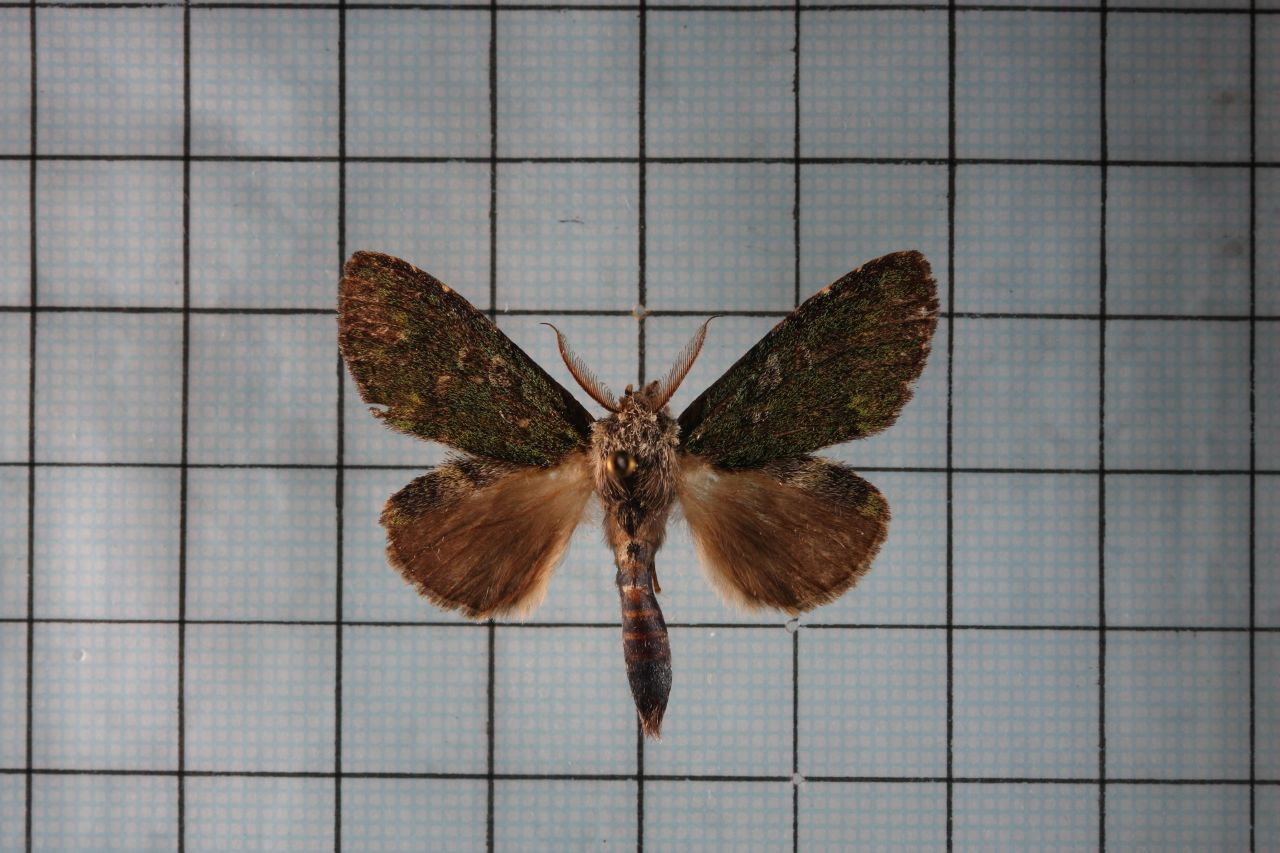

Scientific classification
- Kingdom: Animalia
- Phylum: Arthropoda
- Class: Insecta
- Order: Lepidoptera
- Superfamily: Noctuoidea
- Family: Notodontidae
- Genus: Syntypistis
- Species: S. viridipicta

Binomial name
- Syntypistis viridipicta (Wileman, 1910)

Synonyms
- Stauropus viridipicta Wileman, 1910; Quadricalcarifera viridipicta; Stauropus chlorotricha Hampson, 1912; Quadricalcarifera eusebia Kiriakoff, 1974; Quadricalcarifera doloka Kiriakoff, 1967; Desmeocraera marginalis Matsumura, 1920; Desmeocraera kusukukuana Matsumura, 1929; Desmeocraera lineata Okano, 1960; Quadricalcarifera medioviridis Kiriakoff, 1963; Quadricalcarifera viridigutta Kiriakoff, 1963

= Syntypistis viridipicta =

Species of moth

Syntypistis viridipicta is a species of moth of the family Notodontidae first described by Wileman in 1910. It is found in northern India, Sundaland, China (Zheijiang, Fujian, Hubei, Hunan, Guangdong, Guangxi, Guizhou, Hainan, Jiangxi), Taiwan, Myanmar, Thailand, Vietnam, Nepal, Laos and Cambodia.
