= Syntypistis melana =

Scientific classification
- Kingdom: Animalia
- Phylum: Arthropoda
- Clade: Pancrustacea
- Class: Insecta
- Order: Lepidoptera
- Superfamily: Noctuoidea
- Family: Notodontidae
- Genus: Syntypistis
- Species: S. melana

Binomial name
- Syntypistis melana C. S. Wu & C. L. Fang, 2003

Species of moth

Syntypistis melana is a species of moth of the family Notodontidae first described by Chun-Sheng Wu and Cheng-Lai Fang in 2003. It is found in the Chinese provinces of Guangxi and Guizhou.

The wingspan is 40–43 millimetres (1.6–1.7 in).
