= Syntypistis victor =

Scientific classification
- Kingdom: Animalia
- Phylum: Arthropoda
- Clade: Pancrustacea
- Class: Insecta
- Order: Lepidoptera
- Superfamily: Noctuoidea
- Family: Notodontidae
- Genus: Syntypistis
- Species: S. victor

Binomial name
- Syntypistis victor Schintlmeister & C. L. Fang, 2001

Species of moth

Syntypistis victor is a species of moth of the family Notodontidae first described by Alexander Schintlmeister and Cheng-Lai Fang in 2001. It is found in the Chinese provinces of Beijing, Liaoning, Hubei and Shaanxi.
