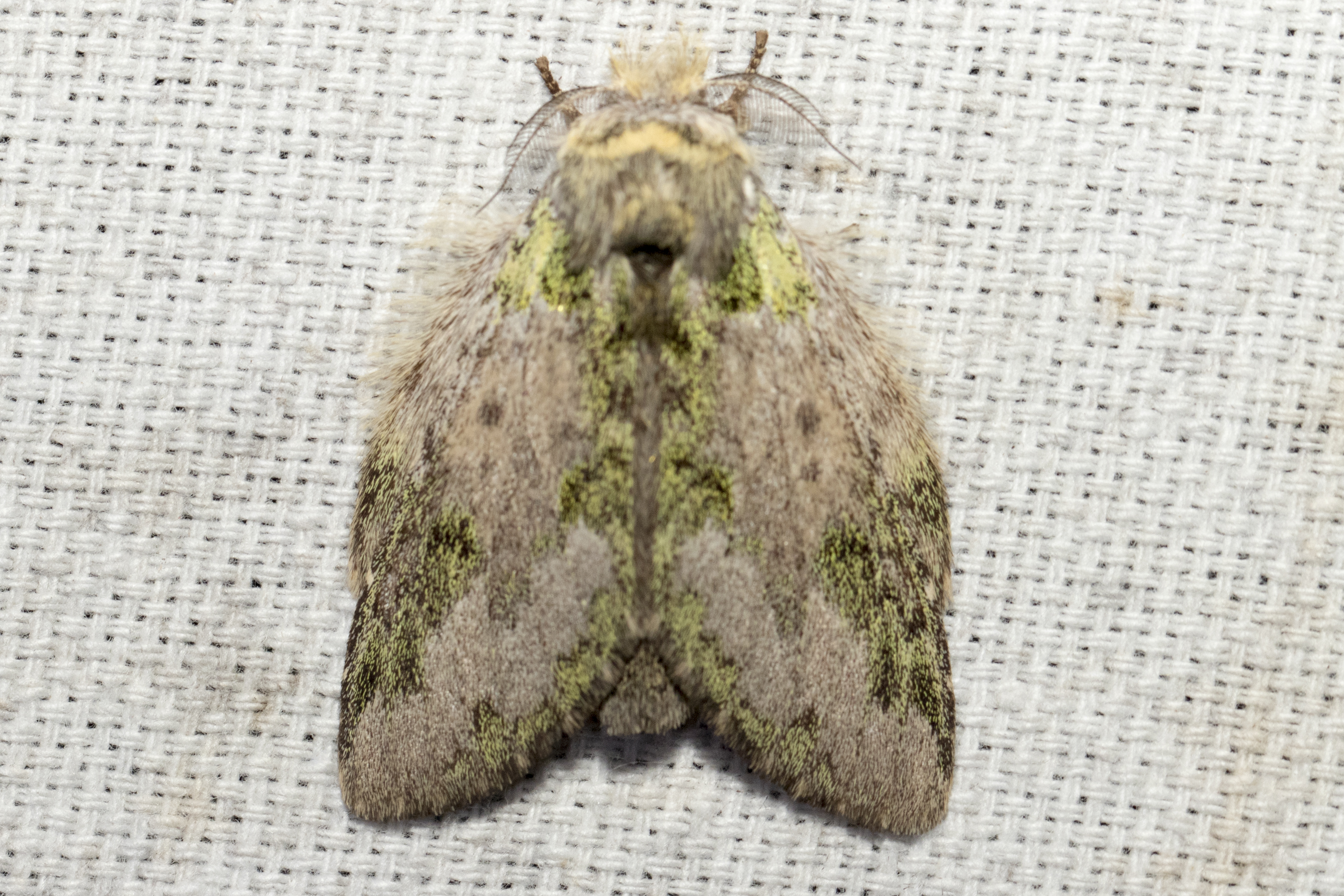

Scientific classification
- Kingdom: Animalia
- Phylum: Arthropoda
- Class: Insecta
- Order: Lepidoptera
- Superfamily: Noctuoidea
- Family: Notodontidae
- Genus: Syntypistis
- Species: S. parcevirens

Binomial name
- Syntypistis parcevirens (de Joannis, 1929)

Synonyms
- Stauropus parcevirens de Joannis, 1929; Stauropus sporadochlorus Bryk, 1949; Quadricalcarifera synechochlora Kiriakoff, 1963; Quadricalcarifera plebeja Kiriakoff, 1963

= Syntypistis parcevirens =

Species of moth

Syntypistis parcevirens is a species of moth of the family Notodontidae first described by Joseph de Joannis in 1929. It is found in Vietnam, Myanmar and the Chinese provinces of Fujian, Hubei, Hunan, Sichuan, Yunnan, Shaanxi and Gansu.
