= Syntypistis fasciata =

Scientific classification
- Domain: Eukaryota
- Kingdom: Animalia
- Phylum: Arthropoda
- Class: Insecta
- Order: Lepidoptera
- Superfamily: Noctuoidea
- Family: Notodontidae
- Genus: Syntypistis
- Species: S. fasciata

Binomial name
- Syntypistis fasciata (Moore, 1879)

Synonyms
- Dasychira fasciata Moore, 1879; Quadricalcarifera fasciata

Species of moth

Syntypistis fasciata is a moth of the family Notodontidae first described by Frederic Moore in 1879. It is found in Yunnan, China; Sikkim, India; Myanmar; and Java.
