= Jupiter (1805 ship) =

History

United Kingdom
- Name: Jupiter
- Namesake: Jupiter (mythology)
- Builder: Simon Temple, South Shields
- Launched: 9 July 1805
- Fate: Condemned 1829

General characteristics
- Tons burthen: 342, or 35680/94, or 357 (bm)
- Armament: 12 × 6-pounder guns

Jupiter was launched in 1805 at Shields, England. In addition to sailing generally as a transport, she made one voyage to Bengal sailing there under a licence from the British East India Company (EIC). She also made one voyage to Australia in 1823 carrying a small number of migrants. She was condemned in 1829 as unseaworthy.

== Career ==
She first appeared in Lloyd's Register (LR) in 1806 with Bellamy, master, Bousfield, owner, and trade London transport.

Lloyd's List (LL) reported on 24 February 1807 that the transports Cybelle, Jupiter and Retreat had run aground at Sheerness but had been gotten off with trifling damage.

The Jupiter transport, which had left Portsmouth on 19 December 1807, was reported to have run onshore at the Isle of Wight.

Year	Master	Owner	Trade	Source & notes
1810	Martin	Bousfield	London–Brazil	LR; damage repaired and large repair 1807
1815	J.Martin; J.Goldsmith	Bousfield	London transport	LR; large repair 1807
1820	Smith; Swan	Bousfield	London–Curacoa	LR; large repair 1807, thorough repairs 1817 and 1820

On 2 February Jupiter, Smith, master, was off Poole, on her way to the Spanish Main.

On 17 August 1819, Jupiter, Smith, master, was sailing from Jamaica to London when she ran onshore on the coast of Florida. The crew threw some 70–80 hogsheads of sugar overboard on the 21st and was gotten off with the assistance of some wrecking vessels. She arrived at Nassau, Bahamas, on 7 September. She arrived back at Gravesend on 1 December.

In 1813 the EIC had lost its monopoly on the trade between India and Britain. British ships were then free to sail to India or the Indian Ocean under a license from the EIC.

On 4 February 1821 Jupiter, Swan, master, sailed from Gravesend, bound for Bombay. On 1 January 1822 Jupiter, Swan, master, sailed from Bengal for London. On 27 April Jupiter, Swan, master, was at Saint Helena, having come from Bengal. She sailed for London on 1 May, and arrived at Deal on 1 July.

Jupiter, Captain John (or Johnathon) Park, sailed from London on 2 June 1823. She arrived at Hobart Town, Van Diemen's Land, on 6 November, and Port Jackson on 27 November. She carried a number of women and families sent out by government to join their relatives, together with 12 females from the Guardian Society, and 15 pensioned non-commissioned officers and soldiers of the Royal Artillery to occupy situations of superintendents. She had sailed via Cape Town.

Year	Master	Owner	Trade	Source & notes
1825	Park	Bousfield	London–New South Wales	Register of Shipping (RS); damages and large repair 1817, & thorough repair 1820
1828	Heyward	Bousfield; Moats	Cork–New South Wales; London transport	RS; damages and large repair 1817, & thorough repair 1820

In 1827 Jupiter, Hawood, master, was serving as a troop transport. Lloyd's List reported on 11 May 1827 that the Jupiter transport, from Jamaica to Portsmouth, had put into Nassau on 11 March. She had struck on the Colerados and a reef. The troops she was carrying had disembarked and her stores were being landed.

== Fate ==
Lloyd's List reported on 24 March 1829 that Jupiter, Clappison, master, had been condemned at Bermuda. Another source stated that Jupiter had been condemned at Bermuda as unseaworthy and had been sold for breaking up.
