= Jupiter (Starfucker album) =

Studio album by Starfucker
- Released: May 05, 2009 (mini-LP) Jan 10, 2012 (re-release)
- Genre: Indie rock, electronic, synthpop
- Length: 26:37 (mini-LP) 32:34 (re-release)
- Label: Badman Recording Co.

Starfucker chronology
Starfucker (2008)	Jupiter (2009)	Reptilians (2011)

Professional ratings
Review scores
Source	Rating
AllMusic	2.5/5 stars
Islington Gazette	3/5 stars
Spin	4/5 stars
Tiny Mix Tapes	3.5/5 marks

Jupiter is the second studio album by the Portland-based indie rock band Strfkr, released under the name Starfucker. It was originally released as a mini-LP on May 5, 2009, through Badman Recording Co., and was re-released on January 10, 2012, as a full album with three new tracks as well as updated artwork and mixes of the previously-existing tracks.

== Track listing ==
All lyrics are written by Joshua Hodges; except where indicated; all music is composed by Starfucker; except where indicated.

No.	Title	Length
1.	"Medicine"	4:16
2.	"Boy Toy"	3:13
3.	"Dance Face 2000"	3:01
4.	"Bed-Stuy (Super Cop)"	2:43
5.	"Biggie Smalls"	3:39
6.	"Girls Just Want to Have Fun" (Robert Hazard)	3:07
7.	"Jupiter"	1:54
8.	"Cemetery"	1:12
9.	"Queen Latifah"	1:00
10.	"Jamie"	3:43
11.	"Rawnald Gregory Erickson the Second (Strategy Remix)"	4:44
Total length:		32:34

Note: "Cemetery", "Queen Latifah" and "Jamie" were not included on the original 2009 release, but were added for the 2012 re-release.
