= Jupiter (apple) =

Apple cultivar

'Jupiter' apple
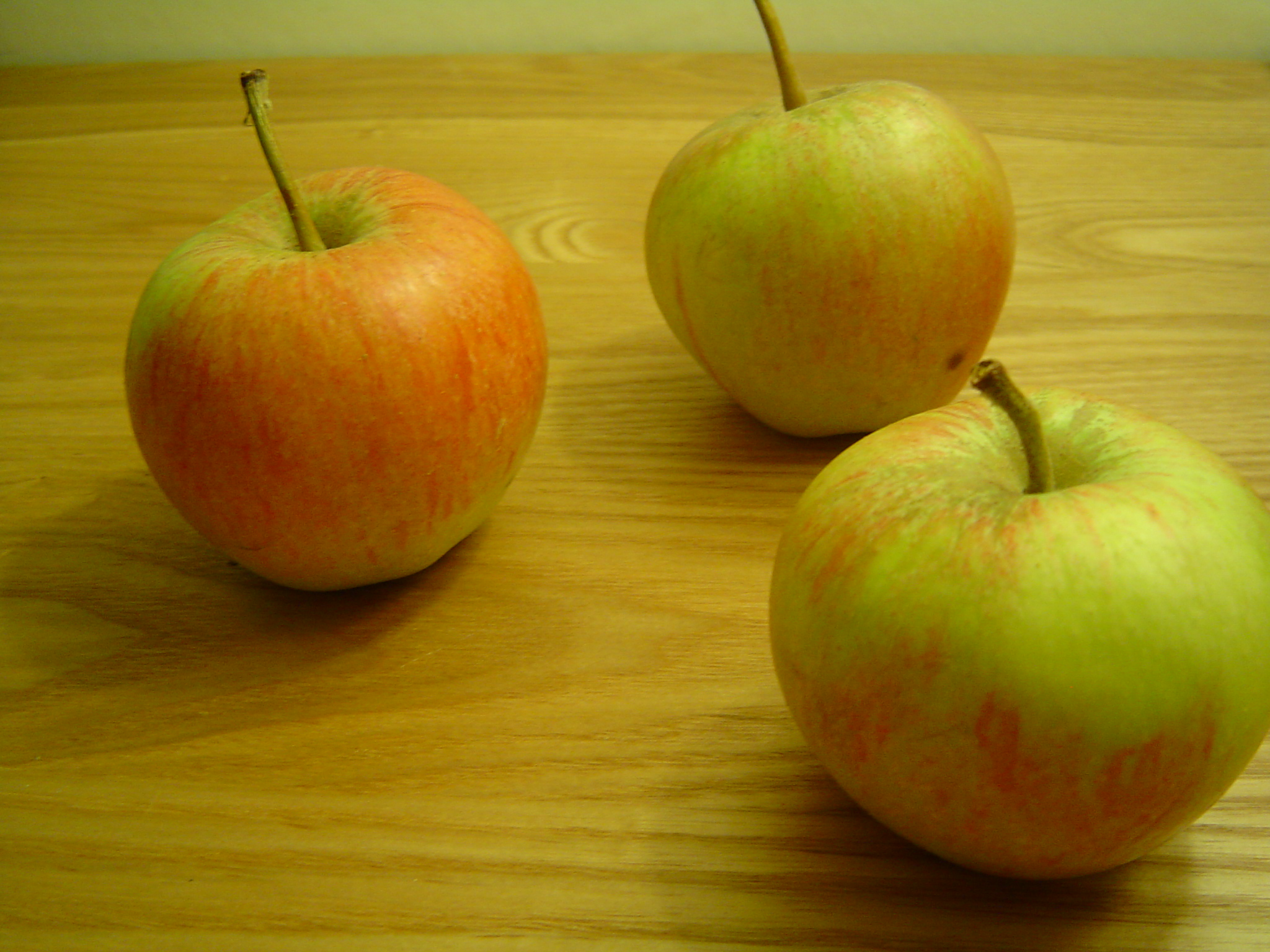
- Hybrid parentage: Cox's Orange Pippin × Starking Delicious
- Cultivar: 'Jupiter'
- Origin: England

Jupiter is a modern cultivar of domesticated apple which was developed in England, by crossing a Cox's Orange Pippin with a Starking Delicious apple. According to the Orange Pippin website, it is one of the best Cox-style apples, with somewhat a more robust flavor, but more importantly, much more disease resistant. It is a heavy cropper and has a tendency to biennial bearing if not thinned. It is also frost resistant, and earned the Award of Garden Merit by the Royal Horticultural Society in 1993.

== See also ==
- Topaz (apple)
