= Alfred Jupiter =

American baseball player

- Pitcher
- Born: June , 1871; Phelps, New York, U.S.
- Died: February 28, 1911 (aged 39); Boston, Massachusetts, U.S.

Negro league baseball debut
- 1897, for the Cuban Giants

Last appearance
- 1897, for the Cuban Giants

Teams
- Cuban Giants (1897)

Alfred B. Jupiter (June 1871 – February 28, 1911) was an American Negro league pitcher in the 1890s.

A native of Phelps, New York, Jupiter played for the Cuban Giants in 1897. He died in Boston, Massachusetts in 1911 at age 39.
