= Starfucker (Starfucker album) =

- Cover of the first pressing of the vinyl and CD

Studio album by Starfucker
- Released: September 23, 2008
- Genre: Indie rock; electronic; synthpop
- Length: 35:44
- Label: Badman Recording Co.

Starfucker chronology
Starfucker (2008)	Jupiter (2009)

Starfucker is the debut studio album by the Portland-based indie rock band Strfkr, released under the name Starfucker on September 23, 2008, through Badman Recording Co.

== Composition ==
Josiah Hughes of Exclaim! described Starfucker as a mixture of "laidback" pop music with "epic" electronic sounds.

== Critical reception ==
Professional ratings
Aggregate scores
Source	Rating
Metacritic	65/100
Review scores
Source	Rating
AllMusic	3/5 stars
Lost At Sea	7/10
Pitchfork Media	5/10
PopMatters	7/10
The Stranger	3/5 stars
URB	3.5/5 stars
XLR8R	5/10

Hughes was ecstatic towards the LP, calling it "a debut album that cannot be missed". He highlighted its "addictive pop hooks", "mature arrangements" and "pristine", "top-notch" production.

== Track listing ==
All lyrics are written by Joshua Hodges; all music is composed by Strfkr.

No.	Title	Length
1.	"Florida"	3:50
2.	"German Love"	3:32
3.	"Myke Ptyson"	2:30
4.	"Laadeedaa"	2:17
5.	"Rawnald Gregory Erickson the Second"	2:53
6.	"U Ba Khin"	3:14
7.	"Holly"	3:00
8.	"Hard Smart Beta"	1:39
9.	"Pop Song"	3:55
10.	"Miss You"	2:37
11.	"Isabella of Castile"	4:31
Total length:		35:44
