= Jupiter, ex-Goding Stradivarius =

Antique violin

The Jupiter, ex-Goding Stradivarius is a violin constructed in 1722 by the famous luthier Antonio Stradivari of Cremona. It is one of only 700 extant Stradivari instruments in the world today.

== Ownership history ==
The violin is named for English collector James Goding, who is said to have named it "Jupiter". It is also known as "Imperator". Goding sold the violin in 1857 to Vicomte de Janzé through Jean-Baptiste Vuillaume. In 1886, the Duke of Camposelice acquired it through the dealer George Withers. After the Duke of Camposelice's death in 1887, his wife sold the violin to Thurlow Weed Barnes of New York. W. E. Hill & Sons purchased the violin in 1898 and resold it to Robert E. Brandt. For much of the 20th Century, it was owned by John S. Phipps. In 1971, Professor of Medicine Dr. Ephraim P. Engleman purchased the violin through Rembert Wurlitzer. In 1992, it was purchased by the Hayashibara Foundation who then sold it to the Nippon Music Foundation in May 1998.

== Users ==
It was on extended loan to Midori prior to her receiving the 1731c ex-Gibson/ex-Huberman del Gesu, which is now her concert instrument. Her play of Jupiter is available from the recording of "Sibelius Violin Concerto" with Israel Philharmonic Orchestra by Sony Classical. She quit playing Jupiter in a short time because the body and neck were too big for her, such that it often hurt her hands, fingers, and arms. And then, it was on loan to Daishin Kashimoto and Manrico Padovani.

It is currently on loan to Ryu Goto since December 2013.

== See also ==
- Stradivarius
- Jupiter Stradivarius
