= Jupiter grape =

Variety of grape

Vitis vinifera x Vitis labrusca 'Jupiter grape'
- Species: Vitis vinifera x Vitis labrusca
- Hybrid parentage: Arkansas 1258 × Arkansas 1762
- Cultivar: 'Jupiter grape'
- Origin: University of Arkansas, United States, 1998

The Jupiter grape is an interspecific seedless Muscat grape developed at the University of Arkansas in 1998. It is a cross of Arkansas 1258 x Arkansas 1762, both of them V. labrusca and V. vinifera hybrids. The Muscat flavor comes from “Gold” (vitis vinifera) variety; the seedlessness comes from “Reliance” (vitis labrusca) variety. This 1998 grape variety patent by the University of Arkansas lapsed in 2019..

Jupiter has large, oval blue-purple berries on large clusters. Its skins are not too tough or too tart to impede its desirability as a table grape. It has mild but pleasant flavor and a pronounced flowery "Muscat-type" aromatic profile that carries through in wines made from it. It can be trained to an upright growth habit. The grape has moderate-to-strong resistance to fungal diseases, and can be grown successfully in climates as different as the South and the Pacific Northwest. The variety can attain 21 Brix in sugars and has reached high yields of 25-29 tons per acre. On the negative side, in SW Washington State, it suffers from poor summer drought resistance (on an especially dry, well-drained single site location - perhaps that site is not suitable for commercial viticulture) even with some supplemental irrigation, and from cluster shatter during automated mechanical harvest.
