= Jupiter Stradivarius =

1700 violin by Stradivarius

The Jupiter Stradivarius is a violin constructed in 1700 by luthier Antonio Stradivari of Cremona. It is one of only 700 extant Stradivari instruments in the world today.

The Jupiter was once owned and played by virtuoso violinist Giovanni Battista Viotti.

The Jupiter Strad is an instrument used as a pattern for violin makers. It has a fine grained front and retains much of its original varnish. The neck has been replaced 5 times and the radii of the neck are smaller than one might expect on a neck, The join to the original scroll is almost indetectable. The top of the scroll appears narrower than that of the Gibson Strad but the difference in measurement is probably negligible. The back of the scroll is worn away from friction with the case during transportation, proving that this has been a working violin for more three centuries.

== See also ==
- Stradivarius
- Jupiter, ex-Goding Stradivarius
- Viotti Stradivarius
