= Operation Jupiter =

Operation Jupiter may refer to:

- from 1941 to 1944, Operation Jupiter (Norway) was a British plan for an invasion of northern Norway
- in 1942, according to David Glantz, Operation Jupiter was a canceled Soviet plan for an attack towards Vyazma, as a part of failed Operation Mars
- in 1944, Operation Jupiter (1944) was an attack launched by the Second British Army
- in 1945, Operation Jupiter was the liberation of the Île d'Oléron by Free French Forces
- Operation Jupiter was the French title of the 1988 video game Hostages
- Operation Jupiter was the West German title for the 1984 Japanese science-fiction film Sayonara Jupiter
