= Stacy Jupiter =

Marine scientist

- Born: 1975 (age 50–51)
- Known for: MacArthur Fellowship

Academic background
- Education: Harvard University; University of California, Santa Cruz

Academic work
- Discipline: Marine science

Stacy Jupiter is a marine scientist who won the MacArthur Fellowship in 2019. According to Newsday, she was the only "overseas" fellow recognized in 2019. Her research focuses primarily on working with the practices of local communities to develop effective strategies that conserve and protect the coastal systems. She performs her work primarily in Melanesia, a Pacific region including Fiji, Solomon Islands, and Papua New Guinea.

== Education ==
Jupiter attended Harvard University and received a bachelor's degree in Biology in 1997. In 2006 Jupiter received a PhD focused on the connections between land usage and downstream impacts from the University of California, Santa Cruz.

== Early life and education ==
Jupiter enjoyed nature from a young age. As an undergraduate, Jupiter volunteered in Australia working with the University of Sydney and the University of New South Wales. Jupiter volunteered with the Peace Corps after college in Gabon, central Africa. This experience allowed her to gain exposure to pollution of the downstream systems and inspired her to attend graduate school. During graduate school, Jupiter attended a lecture by Peter Walsh who had previously worked with the Wildlife Conservation Society (WCS).

== Career ==
The Wildlife Conservation Society appealed to Jupiter, and she later began to work for the organization beginning as an Associate Conservation Scientist, then the Fiji Country Program Director, and as Melanesia Regional Director since 2014.

=== Research ===
In 2009, Jupiter began to realize how harmful flooding could be as she witnessed water destroying houses and roads on the island of Fiji. After some preliminary research, Jupiter realized that large floods spread many waterborne diseases. This discovery led Jupiter to ask herself if members of local communities would strive to do something if they realized their well-being was at risk. Environmental advocacy became Jupiter's mission.

Jupiter works primarily in Melanesia, an area containing much biodiversity. According to Jupiter, many people in the Pacific do not separate themselves from nature as Westerners tend to do, so she's looking for ways to conserve the environment.

Although Jupiter is experienced in marine science, she knew little about the culture of Fiji upon first arriving. Jupiter strives to work alongside fishermen and villagers to learn from them firsthand and collect scientific research from her observations. Many Melanesian communities use a method called tabu (a periodic closure to fishing) to manage coral reef natural resources. Working alongside villagers and observing processes such as tabu, Jupiter attempts to help local communities decide when, where, and how long to close off the areas of the reef. With this research, Jupiter believes the sustainability of thousands of tabu areas across the southwestern Pacific could be improved. Her research also links both the land and sea by considering the effects industries such as logging and mining have on coral reefs. With the help of other collaborators, Jupiter has shown how the rise of logging and mining not only have negative effects on the water quality of coral reefs, but they also increase the risk of transmitting waterborne diseases like typhoid.

== Science communication ==
Jupiter develops content for comic books to reach the public with scientific information. One comic book is about a goby fish who travels throughout the river and come into contact with challenges related to environmental concerns caused by human influence. She also developed puppet shows for children using these stories.

Jupiter also participated in a flash mob of 125 people dancing to a version of “Stayin’ Alive”. This flash mob which was then posted to YouTube was meant to draw the attention of the government to enact a particular set of regulations.

== Awards and recognition ==
In 2019 Jupiter was recognized by the MacArthur Foundation for her efforts to save lives and coral reefs by building on already existing research and considering new ways to manage natural resources. The MacArthur fellowships are awarded yearly by the John D. and Catherine T. MacArthur Foundation for “extraordinary originality and dedication”. This award also comes with an award of $625,000 over five years, and Jupiter was one of 26 selected fellows.
