= Strfkr =

American rock band

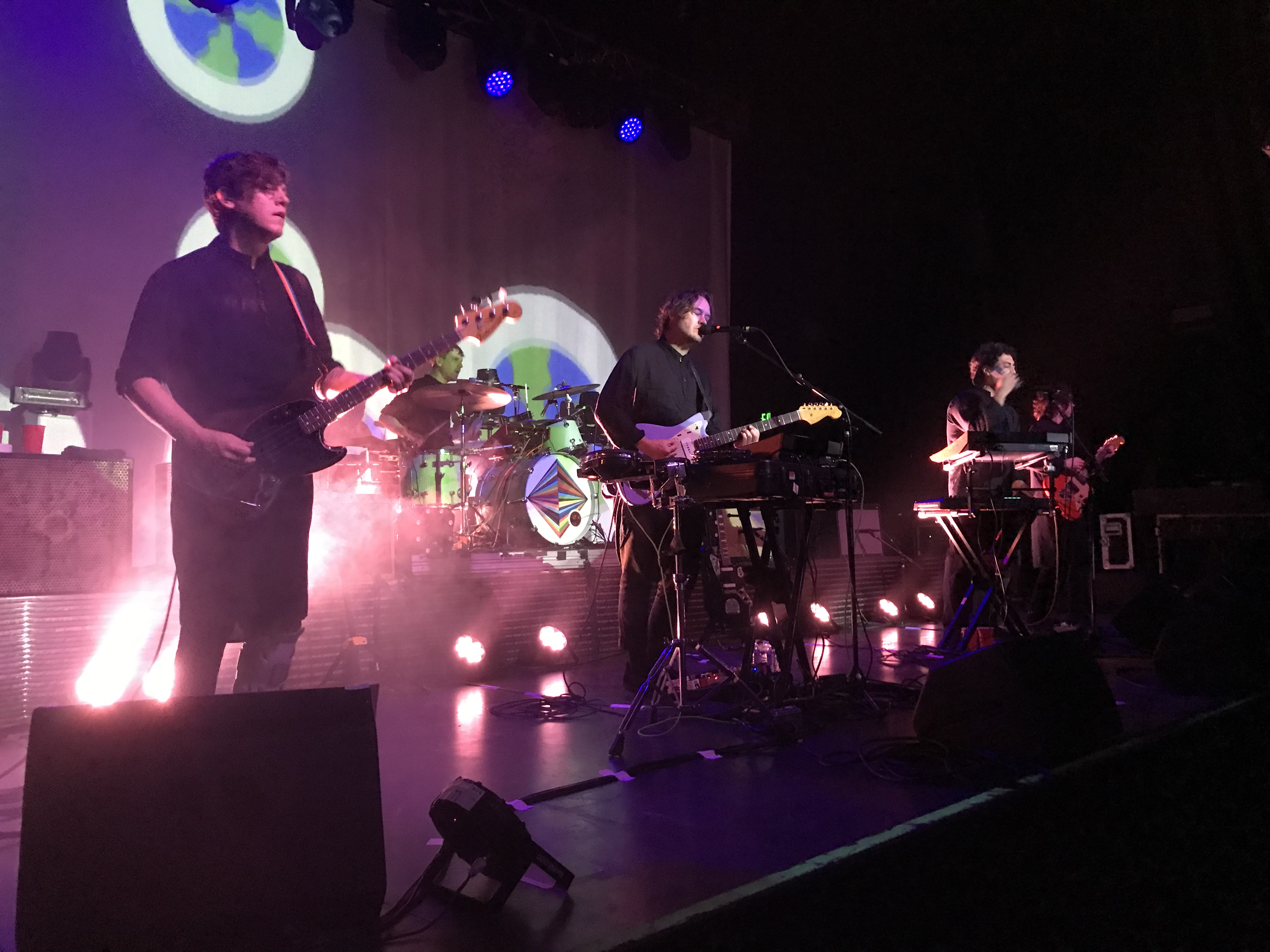
- Strfkr performing at the Depot in Salt Lake City, Utah, in June 2022

Background information
- Also known as: Starfucker; Pyramid; Pyramiddd
- Origin: Portland, Oregon, U.S.
- Genres: Indie rock; indie pop; electronica; synth-pop; neo-psychedelia
- Years active: 2007–present
- Labels: Badman; Polyvinyl
- Members: Joshua Hodges; Shawn Glassford; Keil Corcoran; Arian Jalali
- Past members: Ryan Biornstad; Ian Luxton; Patrick Morris; Andrew Connor
- Website: strfkr.com

Strfkr (a disemvowelment, as well as the letter C, of "Starfucker"), stylized in all caps, is an American indie rock band from Portland, Oregon. It began in 2007 as a solo project of Joshua Hodges.

== History ==
Members include Joshua Hodges of Sexton Blake (vocals, keyboards, guitar, drums), Shawn Glassford (bass, keyboards, drums), Keil Corcoran (drums, keyboards, vocals), and Arian Jalali (guitar, keyboards).

Prior to forming Starfucker, Hodges released a solo album titled Sexton Blake and followed up with an album released under the band name "Sexton Blake" entitled Plays The Hits!, both albums were released on Expunged Records. During this time Corcoran was the drummer for Vegas-based grindcore band The Weirding Way.

The name Starfucker started off as a joke by Sam Norris, an early patron of the band, but the band's success under the name grew rapidly. In response to this success, and with the guidance of an ex manager, they briefly changed their name to Pyramiddd, before quickly changing their name back.

In 2010, Starfucker announced that they would be signing with Polyvinyl Records, releasing a two-song EP, and a full album in preparation for March 2011. On August 2, 2011, Starfucker announced that Ryan Biornstad would be leaving the band. The group shortened their name to STRFKR in 2012.

On February 10, 2016, the band released a single titled "Never Ever", while the album Being No One, Going Nowhere was released in November of that year.

On September 6, 2019, the band released a new single titled "Fantasy", and the band's sixth studio album, Future Past Life was released on April 10, 2020.

On March 1, 2024, the band released their seventh studio album, Parallel Realms, on Polyvinyl Records.

== Use in media ==
Strfkr's song, "Rawnald Gregory Erickson the Second" (2008) was notable for its inclusion in Target's "Pink Pepto" commercial in 2009, created by the Portland ad agency Wieden+Kennedy. The promotion was selected as the AdWeek's "Ad of the Day" on September 4, 2009. "Rawnald Gregory Erickson the Second" was also featured in the TV series Weeds, in a scene where Andy and Audra are in a minivan, as well as their song "Biggie Smalls", included in the final episode of the series (episode 12 of season eight). "Rawnald Gregory Erickson the Second" was also featured in the TV series The Blacklist, near the end of episode 14 of season 1 in 2014.

Their song "Bury Us Alive" was featured in the 2012 film Chronicle.

Strfkr's cover of Cyndi Lauper's "Girls Just Want to Have Fun" from Jupiter was featured in a Juicy Couture ad directed by Terry Richardson starring Candice Swanepoel in 2012, and in the pilot episode for the MTV series Faking It in 2014. Brazilian soap opera “Todas as Flores” used the song as one of the main tracks for the show, in 2022.

The song "Millions", off of the album Reptilians, was played on the American version of the television show Skins. The song "Mona Vegas", off of the album Reptilians, was played in the 2013 film 21 & Over. "While I'm Alive", from the album Miracle Mile, was featured in the film adaptation of The Fault in Our Stars.

The songs "Rawnald Gregory Erickson The Second", "While I'm Alive" and "Bed-Stuy (Super Cop)" were played in the 2014 film Two Night Stand, starring Miles Teller and Analeigh Tipton as main characters, Jessica Zohr, and Scott "Kid Cudi" Mescudi.

“Open Your Eyes” was played during the opening title of Trinkets on Netflix, in the third episode of the first season.

"Biggie Smalls", from the album Jupiter, was played in episode 8 of Apple TV's show Echo 3.

== Style ==
Further explaining the band's name, Josh Hodges said: "I was around all these people who were kind of douchey, the kind of people I would never hang out with, and one of them bragged about being a 'starfucker.' I thought, 'Who are these people? What is this world?' That's why I chose the name: because it represented all I didn't want to be a part of, all I didn't want to do. So it does hold us back, but that was the point, originally." They have also explained it is to keep themselves from taking themselves too seriously as a band and get involved in social politics in the music industry: "I got kind of sick of the idea of success through music or something, so that's how STRFKR was born. I had this other band and the label it was on had this vision for it and I wasn't that into it. So I just kind of quit doing that and I was still making music in my basement. It's just something I always will do whether I'm showing it to other people or not and that's what STRFKR was. I was like, let's just do this at house parties. I was trying to remove myself from that rat race or whatever."

Hodges describes the goal of the band's music as "dance music that you can actually listen to, that's good pop songs, but also you can dance to it.". Another defining characteristic is their lyrics, which often discuss death, mortality, and the end of the world but doing so over upbeat and popular dance music. Samples from lectures by Alan Watts are spliced into several of their songs, including "Florida," "Isabella of Castile," "Medicine," "Pistol Pete," "Mystery Cloud," "Golden Light," "Hungry Ghost", "Interspace" and "Quality Time".

The band, notably bassist Shawn Glassford, has earned a reputation for wearing women's clothing during live performances, as was prominently displayed in the band's music video for the song "German Love", directed by Rebecca Micciche. This is used in harmony with their "anti-fashion" approach to music. However, most of their music videos are not made with much of the band's actual involvement or appearance.

Chris Gray of the Houston Press observed "industrial-strength disco/synth-pop" that combines insistent beats with "a hint of dreamy shoegaze vocals and keyboards... as thick as a Portland fog." Gray drew comparisons to "80s greats like OMD and early Ministry".

== Discography ==
=== Studio albums ===
Year	Details	Peak chart positions		
Year	Details	US	US Heat	US Indie
2008	Starfucker: Released: September 23, 2008; Label: Badman Recording Co.	—	—	—
2009	Jupiter: Released: May 5, 2009; Label: Badman Recording Co.; Notes: Mini-LP re-released with new tracks as full album	—	—	—
2011	Reptilians: Released: March 8, 2011; Label: Polyvinyl Records	—	26	—
2013	Miracle Mile: Released: February 19, 2013; Label: Polyvinyl Records	178	4	29
2016	Being No One, Going Nowhere: Released: November 4, 2016; Label: Polyvinyl Records	—	1	9
2020	Future Past Life: Released: April 10, 2020; Label: Polyvinyl Records	—	—	—
2024	Parallel Realms: Released: March 1, 2024; Label: Polyvinyl Records	—	—	—

=== Extended plays ===
- Starfucker (2008)
- Burnin' Up (2008)
- Jupiter (2009)
- B-Sides (2010)

=== Singles ===
- "Julius" (2010)
- "Happy Fucking Holidays" (2010) (SoundCloud release only)
- "Dragon Queens" 7" Split w/ Champagne Champagne (2011)
- "The Wisdom of Insecurity" from Japan 3-11-11: A Benefit Album (2011)
- "While I'm Alive" (2012)
- "Golden Light" (2014) 12"
- "Astronaut" b/w "Little Lover" (2015) (Record Store Day release, 400 copies)
- "Never Ever" (2016)
- "Amiee" (2017)
- "Fantasy" (2019)
- "Never The Same" (2020)
- "Deep Dream" (2020)
- "Armatron" (2023)
- "Always / Never" (2023)
- ”Together Forever” (2024)
- "Under Water / In Air" (2024)

=== Other releases ===
- Heavens Youth (Reptilian Demos) (2011)
- Mixtape 1
- Vault Vol. 1 (2017)
- Vault Vol. 2 (2017)
- Vault Vol. 3 (2017)
- Being No One, Going Nowhere (Remixes) (2018)
- Live From Brooklyn Steel (2019)
- Ambient 1 (2020)
