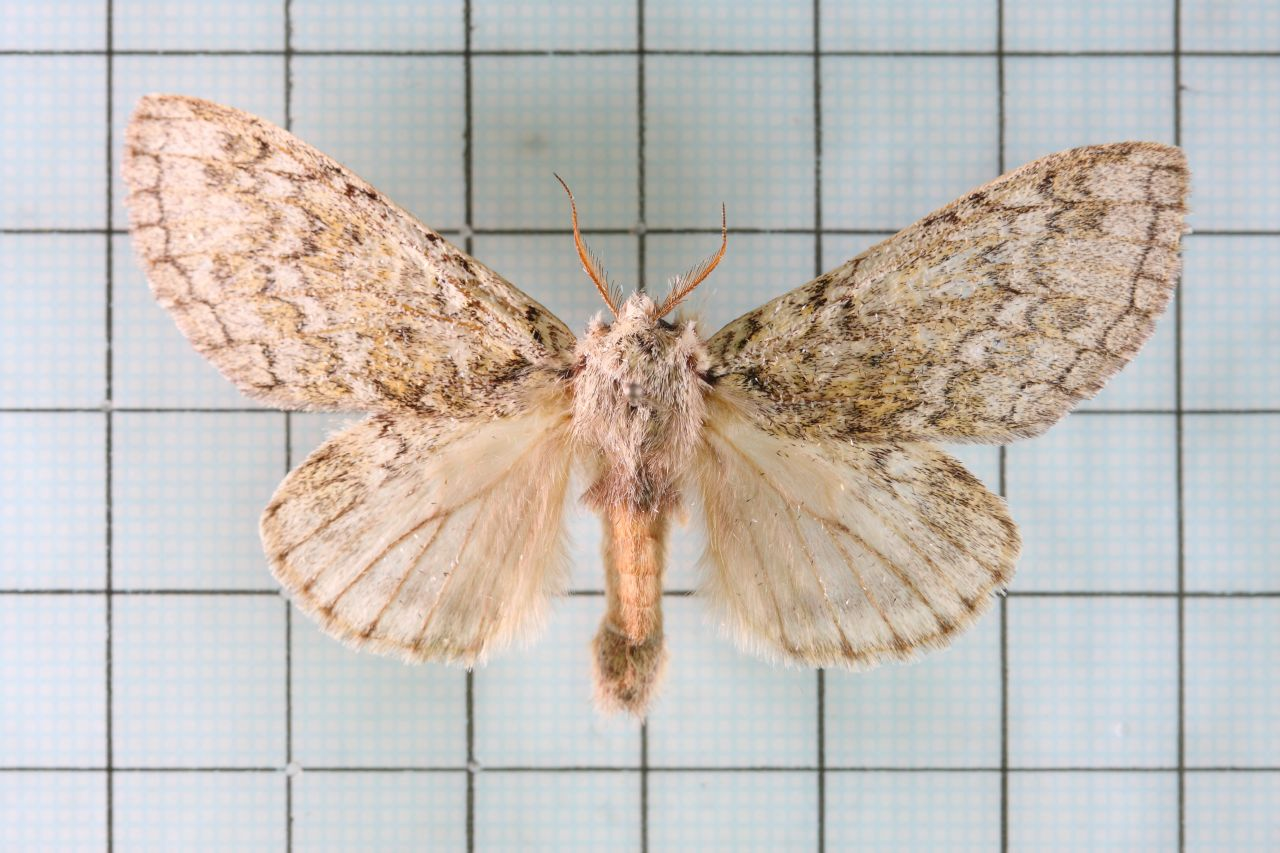
- Syntypistis perdix

Scientific classification
- Domain: Eukaryota
- Kingdom: Animalia
- Phylum: Arthropoda
- Class: Insecta
- Order: Lepidoptera
- Superfamily: Noctuoidea
- Family: Notodontidae
- Subfamily: Cerurinae
- Genus: Syntypistis; Turner, 1907

Synonyms
- Omestia Bethune-Baker, 1908; Egonocia Marumo, 1920; Quadricalcarifera Strand, 1916; Stauropodopsis Roepke, 1944; Taiwa Kiriakoff, 1967; Vaneeckia Kiriakoff, 1968

= Syntypistis =

Genus of insects

Syntypistis is a genus of moths in the family Notodontidae first described by Alfred Jefferis Turner in 1907.

== Species ==
- Syntypistis alboviridis (Kiriakoff, 1970)
- Syntypistis alleni (Holloway, 1983)
- Syntypistis ardjuna (Kiriakoff, 1967)
- Syntypistis amamiensis Nakatomi, 1981
- Syntypistis ambigua Schintlmeister & Fang, 2001
- Syntypistis aspera Kishida & Kobayashi, 2004
- Syntypistis ceramensis (Kiriakoff, 1967)
- Syntypistis chambae (Kiriakoff, 1970)
- Syntypistis charistera (West, 1932)
- Syntypistis chloropasta Turner, 1907
- Syntypistis comatus (Leech, 1898)
- Syntypistis cupreonitens (Kiriakoff, 1963)
- Syntypistis cyanea (Leech, 1888)
- Syntypistis defector (Schintlmeister, 1997)
- Syntypistis eichhorni (Kiriakoff, 1970)
- Syntypistis fasciata (Moore, 1879)
- Syntypistis ferrea (Kiriakoff, 1967)
- Syntypistis grisescens (Roepke, 1944)
- Syntypistis hasegawai (Nakamura, 1976)
- Syntypistis hercules (Schintlmeister, 1997)
- Syntypistis japonica Nakatomi, 1981
- Syntypistis jupiter (Schintlmeister, 1997)
- Syntypistis lineata (Okano, 1960)
- Syntypistis malayana (Nakamura, 1976)
- Syntypistis melana C.S. Wu & C.L. Fang, 2003
- Syntypistis murina (Kiriakoff, 1967)
- Syntypistis nigribasalis (Wileman, 1910)
- Syntypistis opaca Turner, 1922
- Syntypistis palladina (Schaus, 1928)
- Syntypistis pallidifascia (Hampson, 1892)
- Syntypistis paranga (Kiriakoff, 1970)
- Syntypistis parcevirens (de Joannis, 1929)
- Syntypistis perdix (Moore, 1879)
- Syntypistis praeclara M. Wang & Kobayashi, 2004
- Syntypistis pryeri (Leech, 1889)
- Syntypistis punctatella (Motschulsky, 1860)
- Syntypistis rhypara (Kiriakoff, 1970)
- Syntypistis scensus (Schintlemeister, 1997)
- Syntypistis sinope Schintlmeister, 2002
- Syntypistis spadix Kishida & Kobayashi, 2004
- Syntypistis spitzeri (Schintlmeister, 1987)
- Syntypistis subgeneris (Strand, 1916)
- Syntypistis subgriseoviridis (Kiriakoff, 1963)
- Syntypistis synechochlora (Kiriakoff, 1963)
- Syntypistis triguttata (Kiriakoff, 1967)
- Syntypistis trioculata (Holloway, 1976)
- Syntypistis umbrosa (Matsumura, 1927)
- Syntypistis uskwara (Kiriakoff, 1970)
- Syntypistis victor Schintlmeister & Fang, 2001
- Syntypistis viridigriseus (Rothschild, 1917)
- Syntypistis viridipicta (Wileman, 1910)
- Syntypistis witoldi (Schintlmeister, 1997)
