= Jupiter Ghosh =

Bangladeshi cricketer (born 1989)

Personal information
- Born: 22 July 1989 (age 37); Bagerhat, Khulna, Bangladesh
- Batting: Right-handed
- Bowling: Right-arm medium
- Role: All-rounder

Career statistics
Competition	First-class	List A
Matches	7	15
Runs scored	211	251
Batting average	19.18	19.30
100s/50s	0/1	0/0
Top score	56	44
Balls bowled	336	192
Wickets	2	4
Bowling average	61.00	32.75
5 wickets in innings	0	0
10 wickets in match	0	0
Best bowling	1/16	1/16
Catches/stumpings	2/–	2/–
- Source: ESPNcricinfo, 30 November 2016

Jupiter Ghosh (born 22 July 1989) is a Bangladeshi first-class and List A cricketer. A right-handed batsman and right-arm medium. Ghosh is an all-rounder and plays as a right-handed batsman. He currently is playing for Khulna Division.He was born in Bagerhat, Khulna. He has played for Sylhet Royals in the Bangladesh Premier League.
