= Jupi77er =

Brazilian rapper and singer (born 1992)

JUPI77ER
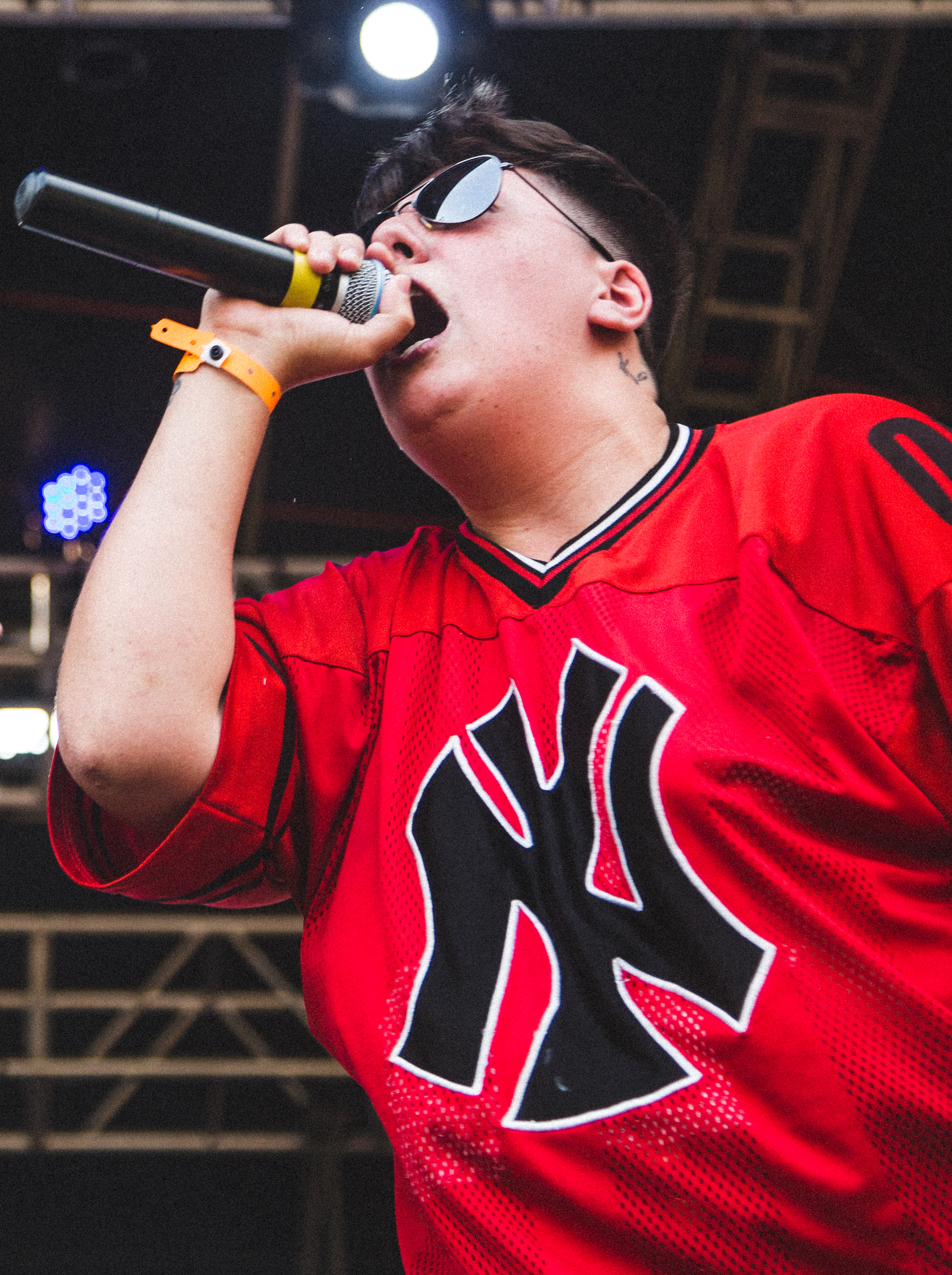
- Jupitter in 2016

Background information
- Born: Jupitter Pimentel Zamboni; September 4, 1992 (age 34); São Paulo, Brazil
- Genres: rap
- Occupations: Rapper; Activist; Composer; Cultural producer
- Member of: Rap Plus Size

Jupitter Pimentel Zamboni (born September 4, 1992, São Paulo), known by the stage name Jupi77er, is a Brazilian rapper, composer, activist, and cultural producer, known for his role in the musical duo Rap Plus Size.

== Biography ==
Pimentel began his career at the age of 12 and participated in rap battles as a teenager with the group Rimologia.

In 2016, he formed the duo Rap Plus Size with Sara Donato, releasing the album Corpo e Alma. The duo participated in protests and performed in shows that criticized the administration of Brazilian president Michel Temer. Together, they already presented at Encontro com Fátima Bernardes. The duo fight for fat acceptance.

Pimentel shared his journey of self-discovery and gender transition on social media, inspiring many people who followed him. His identity generated a variety of public reactions after he was mentioned in the videocast Entre Amigues, fragments of which were shared on social media. Brazilian politician and deputy Nikolas Ferreira recorded a reaction video with Pimentel discussing his gender identity, which became nationally popular.

In 2022, he released the album Transcendência, which addresses issues such as gender identity, resistance movements, and prejudices such as transphobia and fat phobia, while also advocating the use of gender-neutral language to combat sexism. He has also written a course on language and non-binarity.

Following a suggestion by Pabllo Vittar, he participated in the campaign "Mais uma Voz" during the LGBT pride parade of São Paulo in 2022.

== Personal life ==
Pimentel identifies as non-binary and transmasculine, describing his gender identity as genderfluid and more specifically as boyceta. According to his statements, these more inclusive labels accommodate the nuances of gender and gender expression. The Brazilian slang word boyceta is a portmanteau of "boy" and "buceta" ('pussy'), and according to Pimentel, identifying as a boyceta gives transmasculine people more freedom to embrace their femininity, while also generating one more debate about the multitude of possibilities of gender expression within the LGBTQ community.
