= Shahid Saidi =

Shahid Saidi (Persian: شهيد سعيدي) may refer to:

- Shahid Saidi, Kerman
- Shahid Saidi, Khuzestan
