= Jovo =

Jovo (Serbian: Јово) is a given name, cognate to Jovan. Notable people called Jovo include:

- Jovo Aranitović (born 1974), Montenegrin retired footballer
- Jovo Bakić (born 1970), Serbian sociologist, associate professor at the University of Belgrade
- Jovo Bećir (1870–1942), Montenegrin brigadier general and a colonel of the Royal Yugoslav Army
- Jovo Bosančić (born 1970), retired Serbian footballer
- Jovo Stanisavljević Čaruga (1897–1925), Serbian outlaw in Slavonia in the early 20th century
- Jovo Čučković (born 1952), Serbian former football player and manager
- Jovo Damjanović (born 1996), Montenegrin-born Qatari handball player
- Jovo Ivanišević (1861–1889), Montenegrin composer
- Jovo Kapičić (1919–2013), Yugoslav General and post-war communist politician
- Jovo Kurtović (1718–1809), Serbian shipping magnate who lived and worked in Trieste
- Jovo Lukić (born 1998), Bosnian professional footballer
- Jovo Martinović, freelance investigative journalist in Montenegro
- Jovo Mišeljić (1967–2023), Bosnian footballer
- Jovo Ostojić (1952–2017), politician and paramilitary leader in Serbia
- Jovo Pavlović (born 1989), Australian-Serbian football player
- Jovo Rašković (1929–1992), Croatian Serb psychiatrist, academic and politician
- Jovo Simanić (born 1965), Serbian retired footballer
- Jovo Stanojević "Jovo" Stanojević (born 1977), Serbian former professional basketball player

== See also ==
- Jova (disambiguation)
- Jovi (disambiguation)
