= Jovi =

Jovi may refer to:

- Jovi (musician), Cameroonian rapper
- Jovi-ye Majid, Iranian village
- Fukushima Central Television, Japanese television station (call sign JOVI-DTV)
- Vivo (technology company), a Chinese technology company, branded as Jovi in Brazil

== See also ==
- Jovie (given name)
- Jovie Espenido (born 1968), Filipino police officer
- Bon Jovi (disambiguation)
