= Jovita =

Jovita may refer to:

== People ==
- Jovita Carranza (born 1949), American businesswoman, 44th Treasurer of the United States
- Jovita Delaney (born 1974), Irish camogie player
- Jovita Feitosa (1848–1867), Brazilian soldier
- Jovita Fontanez, American public official
- Jovita Fuentes (1895–1978), Filipina singer
- Jovita González (1904–1983), American folklorist, educator, and writer
- Jovita Idar (1885–1946), American journalist, political activist and civil rights worker
- Jovita Laurušaitė (born 1956), Lithuanian painter and ceramist
- Jovita Livingston (born 1999), Indian actress
- Jovita Moore (1967–2021), American television news anchor
- Jovita Neliupšienė (born 1980), Lithuanian politician
- Jovita Virador, Filipino domestic worker who was one of the murder victims of the Andrew Road triple murders

== Other ==
- 921 Jovita, asteroid
- Faustinus and Jovita, saints
- Jovita (railcar)
- Jovita, Córdoba, town in Argentina
- Lake Jovita; see San Antonio, Florida
