= Jova =

Jova may refer to:

== Persons with the surname ==
- Henri Jova (1919–2014), American architect
- Joseph J. Jova, American diplomat
- Levente Jova (born 1992), Hungarian football player
- Olvido Gara Jova (born 1963), (known as Alaska), Spanish-Mexican singer, DJ, and TV personality

== Persons with the nickname ==
- Jovan Ilić, Serbian poet and politician
- Jovan Jovanović Zmaj, Serbian poet and physician
- Jovanotti, Italian musical artist
  - Jova Live 2002, released as a digital single

== Other uses ==
- Hurricane Jova, several storms with the name
- Jova (Novi Pazar), a village in Serbia
- Jova people, a subgroup of the Opata people of Mexico
- Jova language, extinct Uto-Aztecan language
