= Jovie (given name) =

Given name

- Gender: Unisex
- Language: English, Italian, Latin

Origin
- Meaning: “Jovial”; “of Jove”; English phonetic contracted short form of Giovanni

Jovie or Jovi is a unisex given name with diverse origins.

The name Jovie was popularized in the Anglosphere for girls by a character played by American actress Zooey Deschanel in the 2003 American Christmas comedy film Elf. The name is likely derived from an English short form of the vocabulary word “jovial”, an English word which comes from the Medieval Latin word joviālis, meaning “of Jupiter” and which originally referred to beneficent astrological associations with the planet Jupiter. Fewer than five American girls were named Jovie in 2003. Twelve American girls were named Jovie in 2004, the year after Elf was released. The name Jovie first appeared among the 1,000 most commonly used names for girls in the United States in 2020 and has continued to increase in use. There were 507 American girls given the name in 2023, the year it ranked 588th on the popularity chart.

The names Jovie and Jovi might also be used as short forms of names such as Jovana or Jovita or of names derived from that of Jove, the Ancient Roman equivalent of Jupiter. Both are used as independent given names.

The name Jovi, which has also been used for both males and females, is sometimes used as a spelling variant of Jovie. Jovi is also sometimes used in reference to American singer Jon Bon Jovi, who rose to fame in the 1980s. The singer's stage and band name is derived from a phonetic respelling of his Italian surname, Bongiovi, which is a combination of bon, meaning “good” and Giovanni, the Italian version of the name John.

== Men ==
- Jovi Dufren (born 1990), American television personality
- Jovie Espenido (born 1968), retired Filipino police officer known as a crusader against illegal drugs

== Women ==
- Jovielyn “Jovie” Prado (born 1996), Filipina volleyball player
- Jovi Nicole Engbino Te’o (born 1988), wife of American football player Manti Te’o

== Stage name ==
- Jovi, stage name of Cameroonian rapper, songwriter, sound engineer, entrepreneur, and record producer Ndukong Godlove Nfor (born 1983)
- Jon Bon Jovi, stage name of American singer, songwriter, guitarist, and actor John Francis Bongiovi Jr. (born 1962)
