= Bongiovi (surname) =

Bongiovi is an Italian surname. Notable people with the surname include:

- John Francis Bongiovi Jr. (born 1962), better known as Jon Bon Jovi, American singer-songwriter, record producer, philanthropist, and actor
- Jake Bongiovi (born 2002), American actor and model
- Nina Yang Bongiovi, Asian American film producer
- Tony Bongiovi (born 1947), American record producer

== See also ==
- Bon Jovi (disambiguation)
