= Sleeping car =

Railway passenger car with private sleeping berths

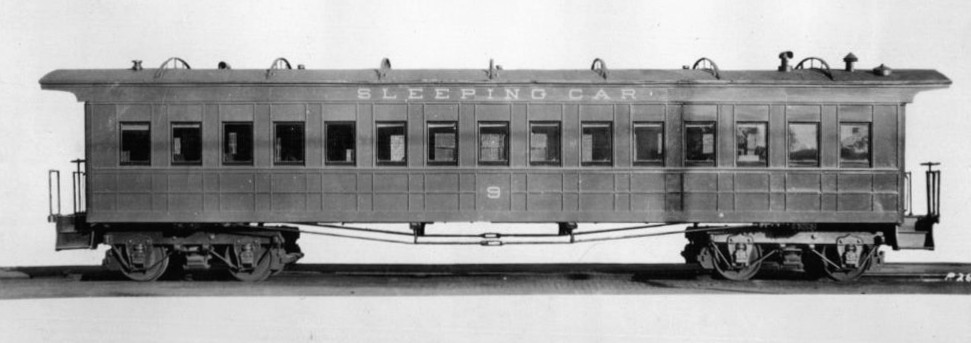
Pullman sleeping car, original to the William Crooks locomotive, on display in Duluth, Minnesota

The sleeping car or sleeper (often wagon-lit) is a railway passenger car that can accommodate all passengers in beds of one kind or another, for the purpose of sleeping. George Pullman was the main American innovator and owner of sleeper cars in the late 19th and early 20th centuries when railroads dominated intercity passenger travel.

The first such cars saw sporadic use on American and English railways in the 1830s; they could be configured for coach seating during the day.

== History ==
Possibly the earliest example of a sleeping car (or bed carriage, as it was then called) was on the London & Birmingham and Grand Junction Railways between London and Lancashire, England. The bed carriage was first made available to first-class passengers in 1838.

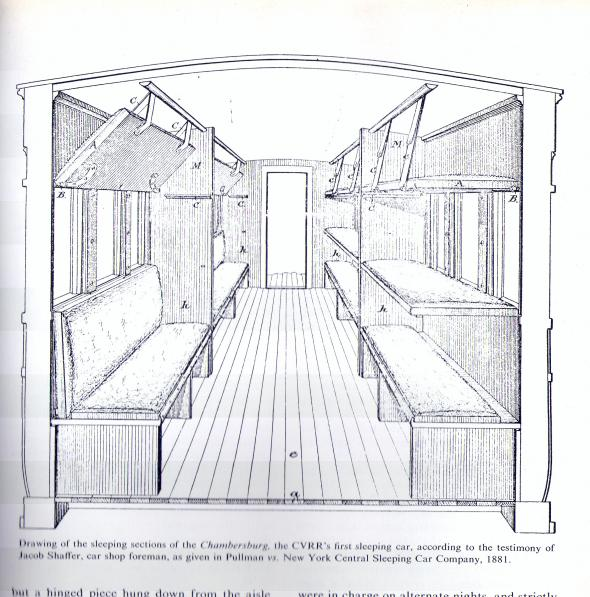
The first American sleeping car, the "Chambersburg" started service on the CVRR in 1839.

In the spring of 1839, the Cumberland Valley Railroad pioneered sleeping car service in the United States with a car named "Chambersburg", between Chambersburg, Pennsylvania and Harrisburg, Pennsylvania. A couple of years later a second car, the "Carlisle", was introduced into service.

In 1857, the Wason Manufacturing Company of Springfield, Massachusetts – one of the United States' first makers of railway passenger coach equipment – produced America's first specifically designed sleeping car. Canadian railways soon followed with their own sleeping cars: first the Grand Trunk in 1858, then the Great Western. The Great Western's sleeping cars were manufactured in-house, with the first three built in 1858, and the railway operating six by 1863.

The man who ultimately made the sleeping car business profitable in the United States was George Pullman, who began by building a luxurious sleeping car (named Pioneer) in 1865. The Pullman Company, founded as the Pullman Palace Car Company in 1867, owned and operated most sleeping cars in the United States until the mid-20th century, attaching them to passenger trains run by the various railroads; there were also some sleeping cars that were operated by Pullman but owned by the railroad running a given train. During the peak years of American passenger railroading, several all-Pullman trains existed, including the 20th Century Limited on the New York Central Railroad, the Broadway Limited on the Pennsylvania Railroad, the Panama Limited on the Illinois Central Railroad, and the Super Chief on the Atchison, Topeka and Santa Fe Railway.

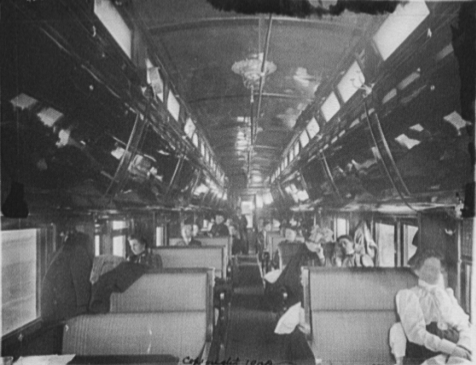
Interior of a Pullman car on the Chicago and Alton Railroad, c. 1900, configured for daytime operation

Pullman cars were normally a dark "Pullman green", although some were painted in the host railroad's colors. The cars carried individual names, but usually did not carry visible numbers. In the 1920s, the Pullman Company went through a series of restructuring steps, which in the end resulted in a parent company, Pullman Incorporated, controlling the Pullman Company (which owned and operated sleeping cars) and the Pullman-Standard Car Manufacturing Company. Due to an antitrust verdict in 1947, a consortium of railroads bought the Pullman Company from Pullman Incorporated, and subsequently railroads owned and operated Pullman-made sleeping cars themselves. Pullman-Standard continued manufacturing sleeping cars and other passenger and freight railroad cars until 1980.

For nearly a year during the end of World War II the United States government banned sleeping cars for runs of less than 450 miles (720 km) in order to make sleepers available for transporting troops returning to the US from Europe, many being deployed in the Pacific Theater. The development of the Interstate Highway System in the 1950s and the expansion of jet airline travel in the same decade negatively affected train travel.

=== Cultural impact of Pullman porters ===
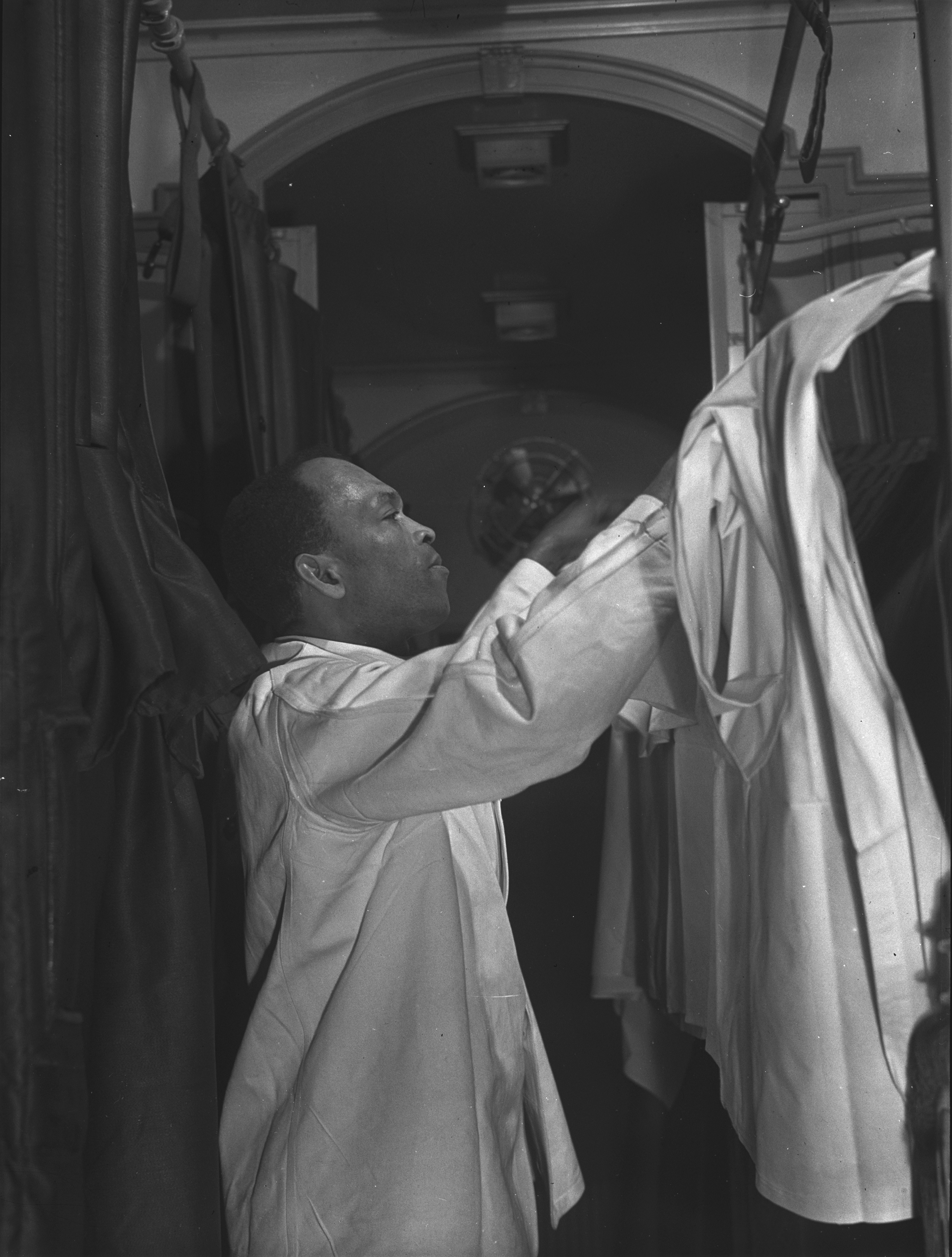
Pullman porter making an upper berth aboard the B&O Capitol Limited bound for Chicago, c. 1944

One unanticipated consequence of the rise of Pullman cars in the US in the 19th and early 20th centuries was their effect on civil rights and African-American culture. Each Pullman car was staffed by a uniformed porter. The majority of Pullman porters were African Americans. While still a menial job in many respects, Pullman offered better pay and security than most jobs open to African Americans at the time, in addition to a chance for travel, and it was a well regarded job in the African-American community of the time. The Pullman attendants, regardless of their true name, were traditionally referred to as "George" by the travelers, the name of the company's founder, George Pullman. The Pullman company was the largest employer of African Americans in the United States.

Railway porters fought for political recognition and were eventually unionized. Their union, the Brotherhood of Sleeping Car Porters (established, 1925), became an important source of strength for the burgeoning Civil Rights Movement in the early 20th century, notably under the leadership of A. Philip Randolph. Because they moved about the country, Pullman porters also became an important means of communication for news and cultural information of all kinds. The African-American newspaper, the Chicago Defender, gained a national circulation in this way. Porters also used to re-sell phonograph records bought in the great metropolitan centres, greatly adding to the distribution of jazz and blues and the popularity of the artists.

=== Open-section accommodation ===
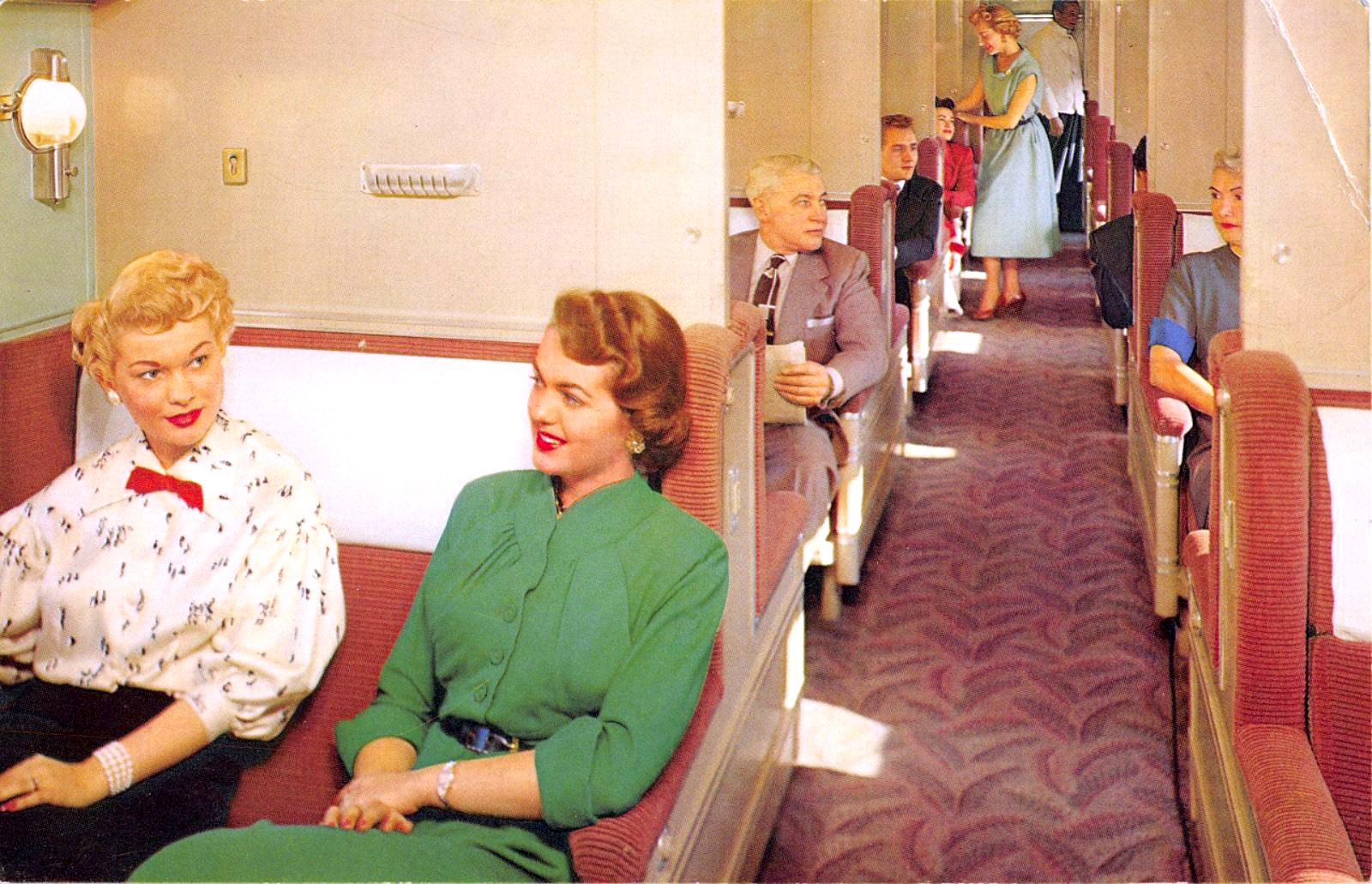
Open section accommodations of a Pullman car in day mode from c. 1950s.

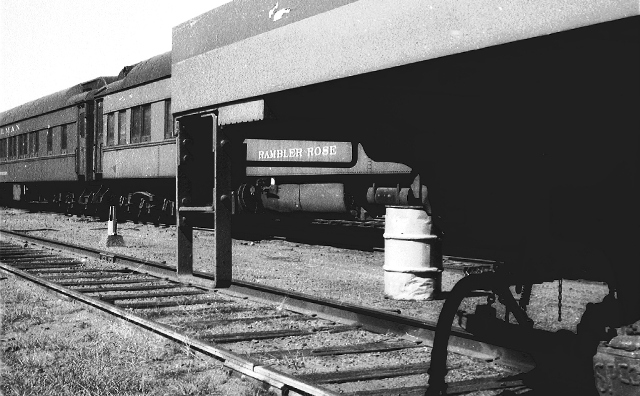
In 1964, aging open-section Pullman cars waited in Portland, Oregon, available for "emergencies".

From the mid-19th to the mid-20th centuries, the most common and more economical type of sleeping car accommodation on North American trains was the "open section". Open-section accommodations consist of pairs of seats, one seat facing forward and the other backward, situated on either side of a center aisle. The seat pairs can be converted into the combination of an upper and a lower "berth", each berth consisting of a bed screened from the aisle by a curtain. A famous example of open sections can be seen in the movie Some Like It Hot (1959).

NH RR's 1942 World War II advertisement "The Kid in Upper 4." This ad depicts an open section of a sleeping car.

=== Private accommodations ===
In the mid-to-late 20th century, an increasing variety of private rooms was offered. Most of these rooms provided significantly more space than open-section accommodations could offer. Open-sections were increasingly phased out in the 1950s, in favor of roomettes. Some of them, such as the rooms of the "Slumbercoach" cars manufactured by the Budd Company and first put into service in 1956, were triumphs of miniaturization. These allowed a single car to increase the number of sleepers over a conventional sleeping car of private rooms.

==== Roomettes ====
A roomette, in the historical sense of the word, was a private room for a single passenger, containing a single seat, a folding bed, a toilet (not in a private cubicle of its own), and a washbasin. When a traditional roomette is in night mode, the bed blocks access to the toilet. Like open sections, roomettes are placed on both sides of the car, with a corridor down the center. Duplex roomettes, a Pullman-produced precursor to the Slumbercoach, are staggered vertically, with every second accommodation raised a few feet above the car's floor level, in order to make slightly more efficient use of the space. Single-passenger Slumbercoach accommodations are a particularly spartan form of roomette; Slumbercoaches also included a few two-passenger units.

==== Compartments and double bedrooms ====
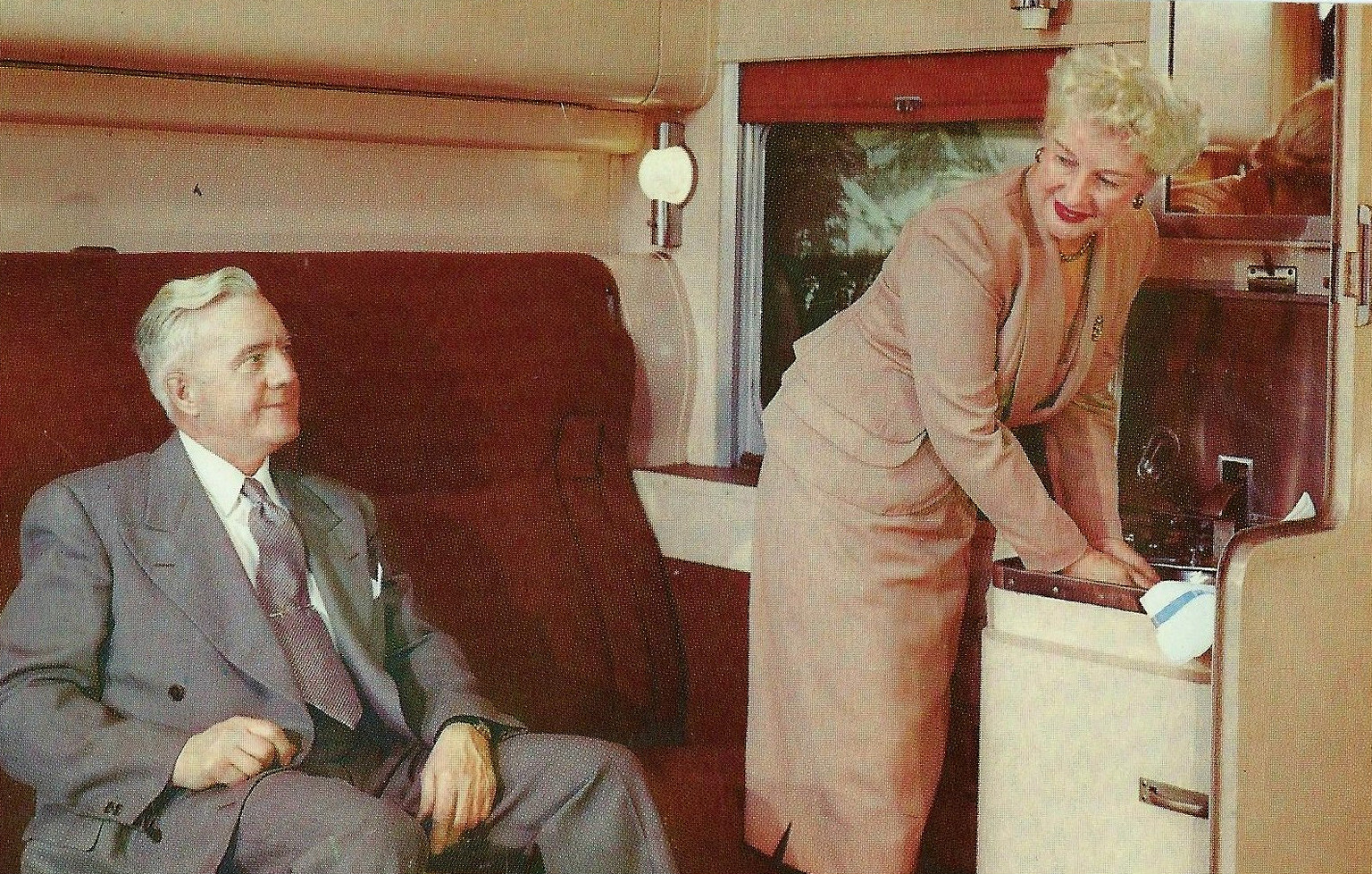
Pullman private compartment, c. 1950s.

Compartments and Double Bedrooms are private rooms for two passengers, with upper and lower berths, washbasins, and private toilets, placed on one side of the car, with the corridor running down the other side (thus allowing the accommodation to be slightly over two thirds the width of the car). Frequently, these accommodations have movable partitions allowing adjacent accommodations to be combined into a suite.

==== Drawing rooms and larger accommodations ====
The drawing room was a relatively rare and expensive option for travelers. It could comfortably accommodate three people, again with a washbasin and private toilet on one side of the car. Even rarer are larger rooms accommodating four or more. Generally the needs of large parties were better served with multiple rooms, with or without the ability to combine them into a suite.

==== Modern Amtrak accommodations ====
Amtrak's Superliner Economy Bedrooms (now called Superliner Roomettes, although they are structurally closer to open sections) accommodate two passengers in facing seats that fold out into a lower berth, with an upper berth that folds down from above, a small closet, and no in-room washbasin or toilet, on both sides of both the upper and lower levels of the car. Effectively, they are open sections with walls, a door, and a built-in access ladder for the upper berth (which doubles as a nightstand for the lower berth passenger). Superliner Deluxe Bedrooms are essentially the same as historic Compartments and Double Bedrooms, with the toilet cubicle doubling as a private shower cubicle. In addition, each Superliner sleeping car has two special lower-level accommodations, each taking up the full width of the car: the Accessible Bedroom, at the restroom/shower end of the car (below the Deluxe Bedrooms), is a fully wheelchair-accessible accommodation for two, with a roll-in cubicle for the toilet and shower; the Family Bedroom, at the Economy Bedroom end of the car, accommodates two adults and up to three small children, without private toilet or shower facilities.

When the Viewliner sleeping cars were built, the accommodations were patterned after the Superliner accommodations, except that the Economy Bedrooms (or "Viewliner Roomettes") include Roomette-style washbasins and toilets, as well as windows for the upper berths.

== Night trains today ==
=== Europe ===
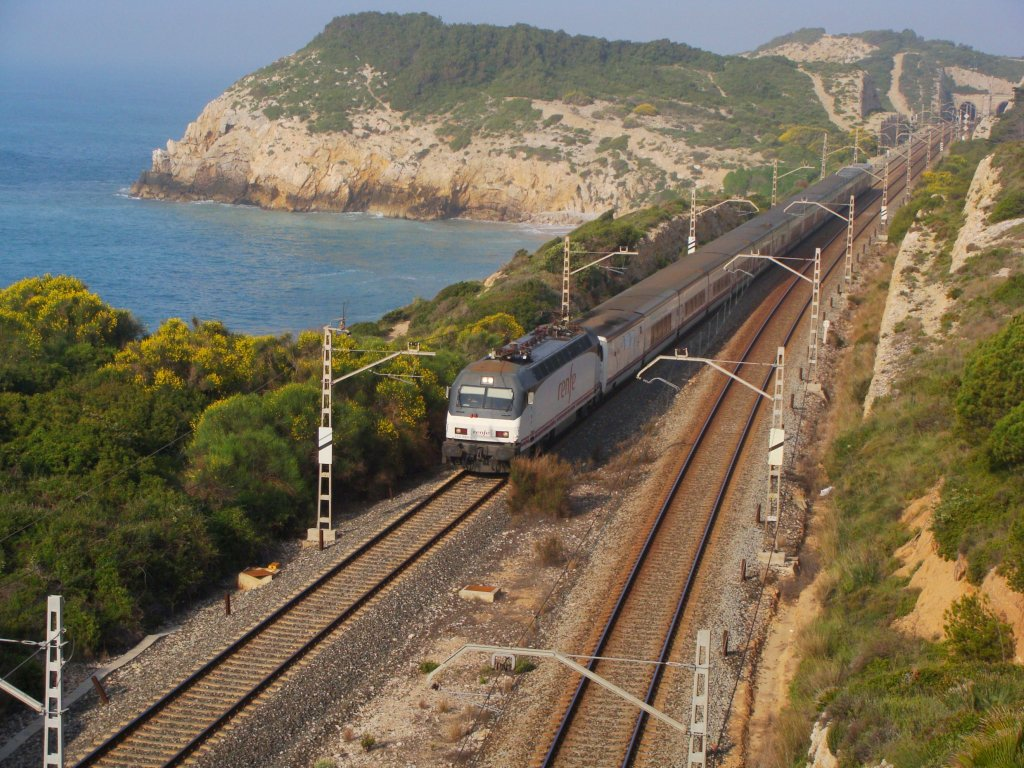
Trenhotel Alhambra between Barcelona and Granada

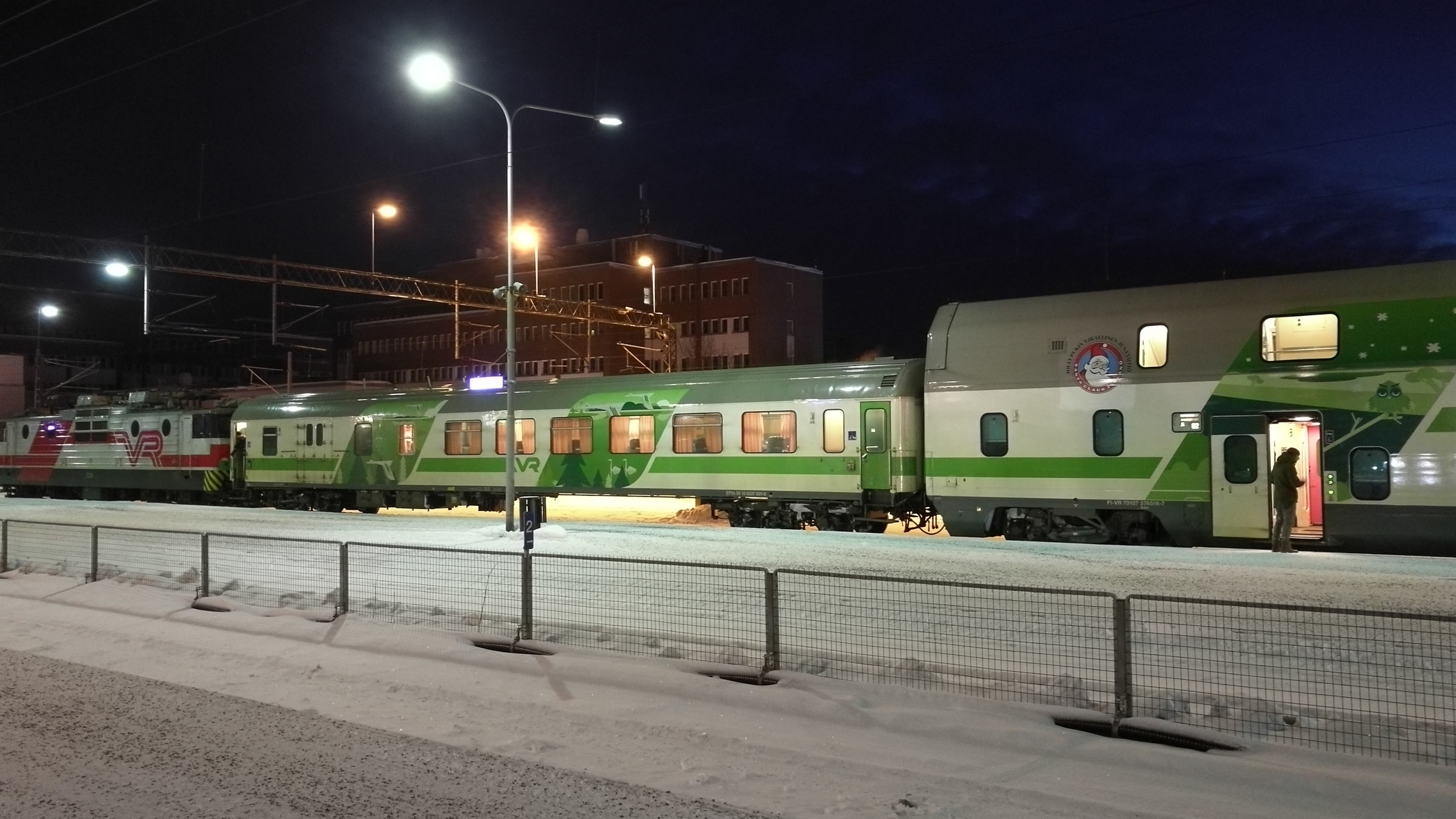
A long-distance night train at the Oulu railway station in Oulu, Finland

In Europe, the Compagnie Internationale des Wagons-Lits (French for "International Sleeping Car Company") first focused on sleeping cars, but later operated whole trains, including the Simplon-Orient Express, Nord Express, Train Bleu, Golden Arrow, and the Transsiberien (on the Trans-Siberian Railway). Today it once again specializes in sleeping cars, along with onboard railroad catering.

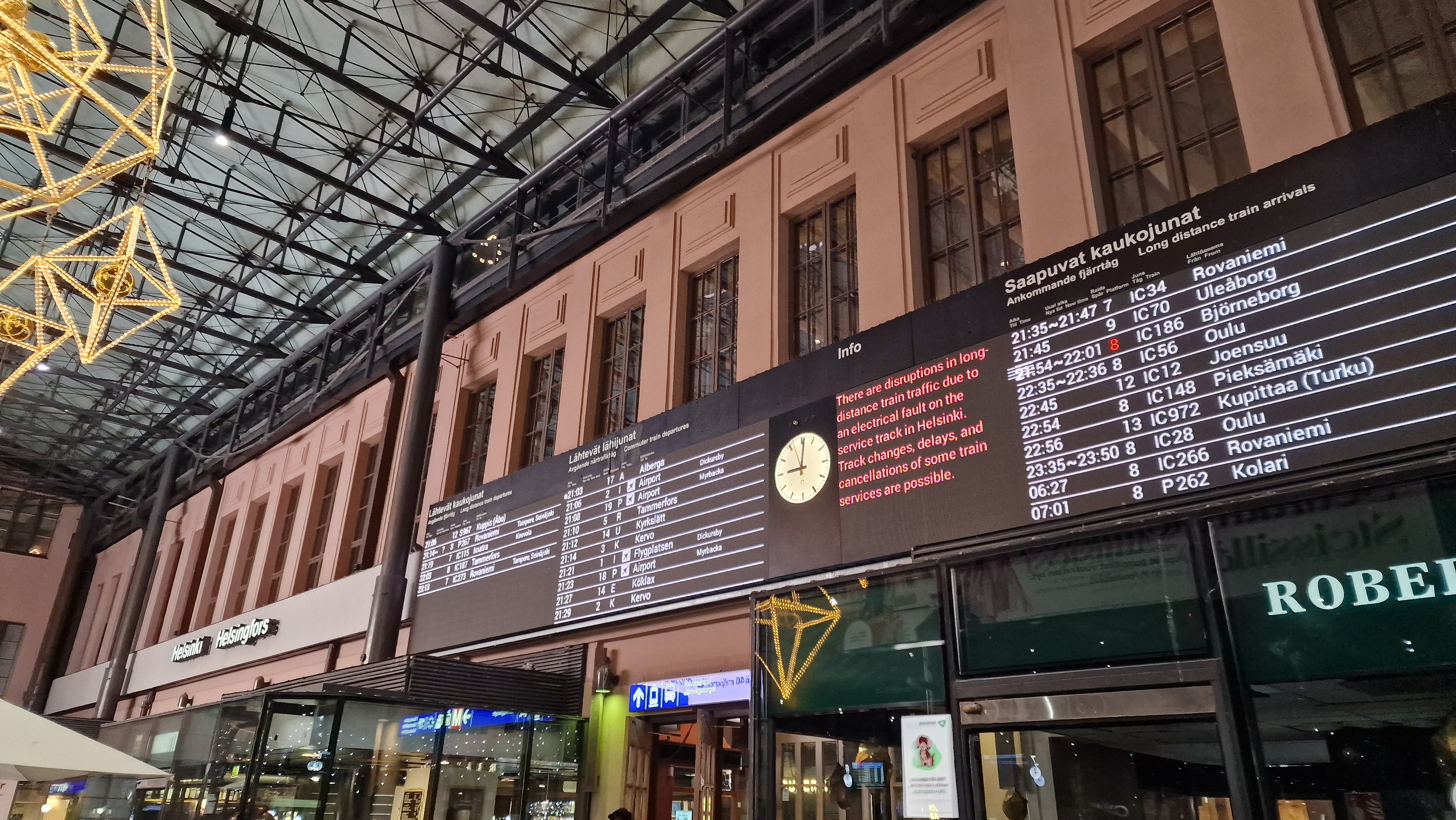
Departure board for overnight sleeper trains in Finland

In modern Europe, a number of sleeping car services continue to operate, though they face strong competition from high-speed day trains and budget airlines, sometimes leading to the cancellation or consolidation of services. In some cases, trains are split and recombined in the dead of night, making it possible to offer several connections with a relatively small number of trains. Generally, the trains consist of sleeping cars with private compartments, couchette cars, and sometimes cars with normal seating.

In Eastern Europe, night trains are still widely used. In Western Europe, they have been in decline for decades. However, in December 2020 the state railways of Germany, Austria, France and Switzerland announced a 500 million euro investment in a network of cross-border night trains linking 13 major European cities, in the largest extension of Europe's night network in many years.

An example of a more basic type of sleeping car is the European couchette car, which is divided into compartments for four or six people, with bench-configuration seating during the day and "privacyless" double- or triple-level bunk beds at night.

In 2021 the French start-up company, Midnight Trains, announced plans to set up a network of sleeper trains, centered in Paris. Planned destinations include Edinburgh, Copenhagen, Berlin, Venice, Rome, Barcelona, Madrid, and Porto, with some intermediate stops. The plans were backed by telecoms billionaire Xavier Niel, the co-owner of Le Monde newspaper. However, the project later collapsed due in part to a lack of funding. In 2021 Europe saw an increase in the provision of sleeper trains which is thought to be the result of increasing awareness of the environmental effects of long-distance travel.

Since 2023, Belgian–Dutch start-up European Sleeper runs sleeper trains from Amsterdam to Berlin and (since 2024) Prague, as well as a seasonal service (since 2025) to Innsbruck and Venice. European Sleeper has also announced plans for an Amsterdam—Barcelona service in 2026 or 2027.

==== Austria ====
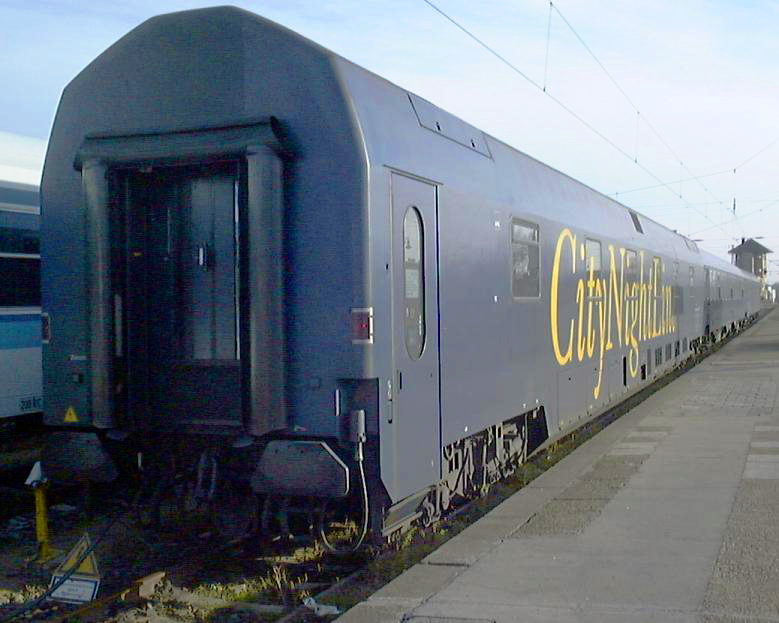
A CityNightLine double-decker sleeping car

ÖBB's modern Nightjet services operate in Germany, Austria, Italy, Switzerland, France, Netherlands and Belgium, and Nightjet's partners will also take passengers to Slovakia, Croatia, Slovenia, Poland, Hungary and the Czech Republic. The services usually leave at around 20:00 hours and arrive at around 09:00 hours at the destination. Some of the Nightjet train units have a maximum speed of 230 km/h.

==== Former Soviet Union countries ====
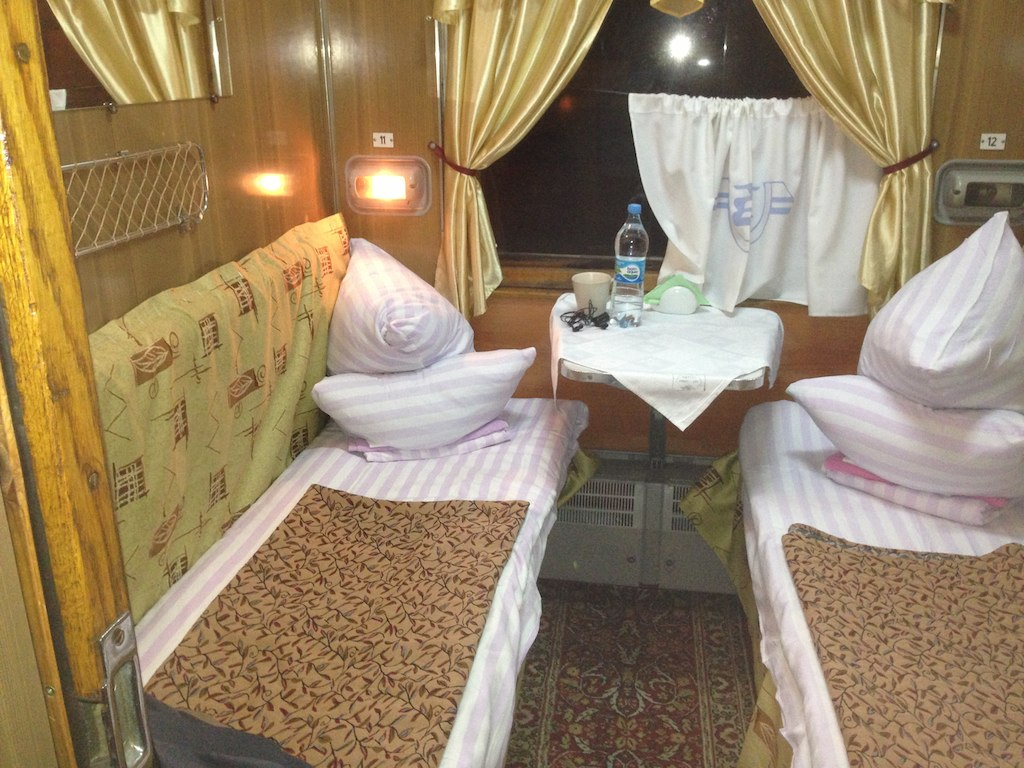
1st class two berth sleeper Kiev to Moscow

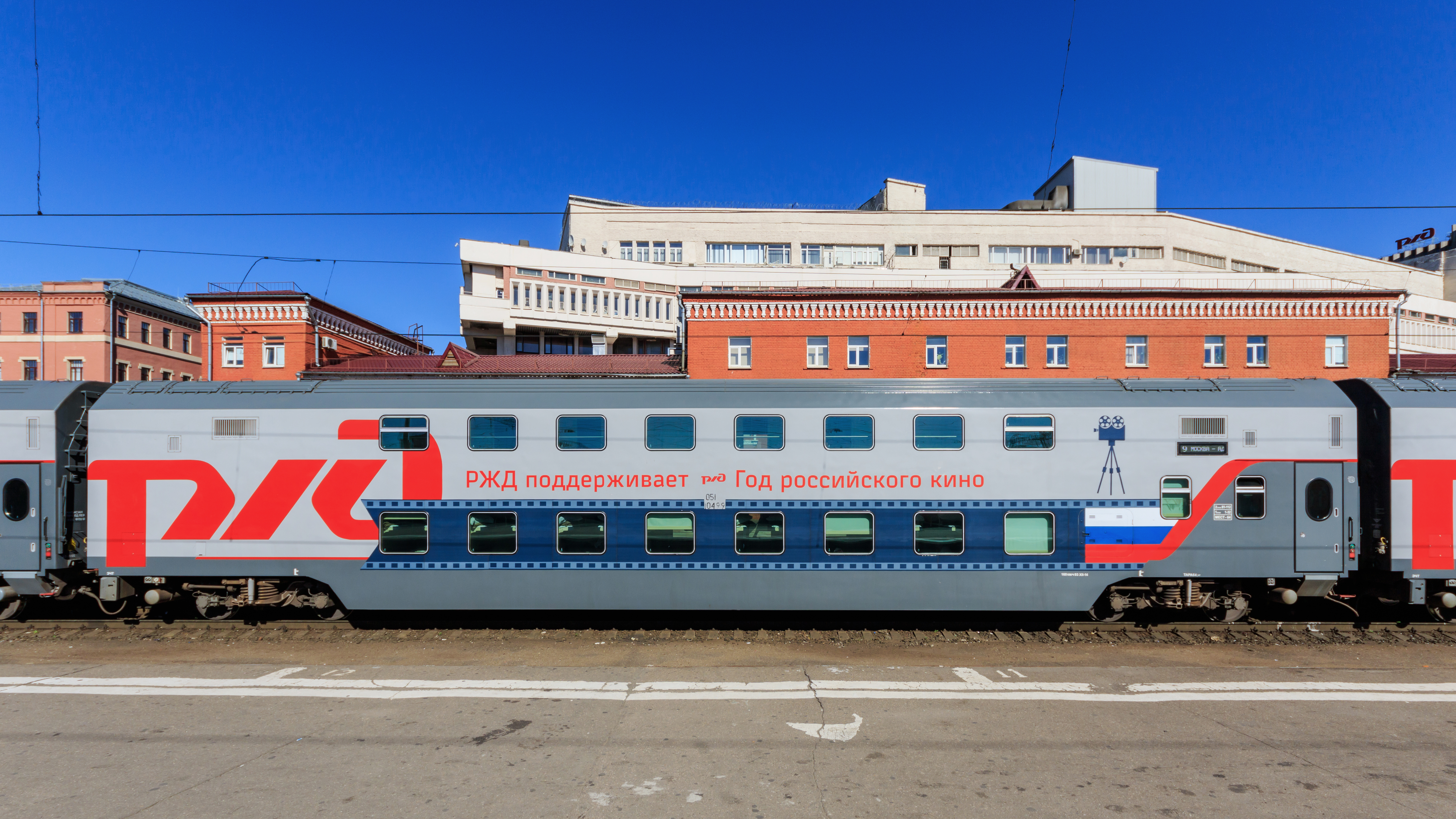
A Russian TVZ double-deck sleeper car

In the Soviet Union overnight train travel formed the most common and accessible mode of long-distance travel, distances between the capital of Moscow and many outlying cities being ideal for overnight trips that depart in late evening and arrive at their destinations in the morning. Sleeping cars with berths are the only reasonable solution for railway trips lasting several days (e.g., trains running along the Trans-Siberian Railway, or direct trains from Moscow or Saint Petersburg to the capitals of the Central Asian Soviet Republics).

Since then, the railroads in the smaller ex-Soviet nations have largely transitioned to daytime intercity trains, such as in Belarus, where the process is based on government-funded purchases of rolling stock supplied by Stadler, which operates a train factory in Minsk, or in Uzbekistan, which has established a 600 km Afrosiyob high-speed rail service between all of its major cities.

In the larger Soviet Union successor states like Kazakhstan, Russia, and Ukraine, on the other hand, night trains are to this day a prime method of railway travel, as a shift towards faster daytime trains with seating rather than sleeping arrangements is hampered by insufficient investments in the railway infrastructure restricting the speed, lack of train sets, and most importantly, the distances involved. While certain numbers of high-speed trains have been acquired by the national railways of these countries (such as Talgo 250 in Kazakhstan, Siemens Sapsan in Russia, or Hyundai Rotem HRCS in Ukraine), all of them continue to operate a large number of sleeper trains both on domestic and international routes.

The need to compete against aviation with its soaring passenger numbers forces the railroads to maintain modest ticket prices, starting at below 10 Euros for third-class tickets in Ukraine, if higher in the richer ex-Soviet nations. Rolling stock age and quality also varies by country. In countries like Kazakhstan and Russia, locally-produced cars are purchased regularly to update the fleet, with newly introduced comforts such as showers, dry toilets, or conditioning units in passenger compartments becoming an increasingly common sight; Russian Railroads have also introduced double-deck sleeper cars; yet comfort levels still suffer from a modest degree of innovation in the bogie suspension systems and the passenger compartment design. Some other post-Soviet nations rely more heavily on the rolling stock fleet inherited from the Union, to a large extent based on vintage life-prolonged cars assembled in East Germany or Soviet Latvia back in the 1980s.

==== Croatia ====
Modern, air-conditioned sleeping cars and couchette cars are part of Croatian Railways rolling stock. Croatian sleeping coaches include single, double or 4-bed compartments with washbasin and many additional hygienic accessories. Passengers also have catering services at their disposal and are given complimentary breakfast, depending on the type of ticket bought. A night train with sleeping carriages included operates on the route between the two largest Croatian towns, Zagreb and Split, and Croatian sleeping coaches are included on the Zagreb-Stuttgart-Zagreb and Zagreb-Zürich-Zagreb EuroNight lines.

==== Czech Republic ====
Sleeping car services in the Czech Republic are operated by České dráhy and RegioJet. ČD operates them on the Prague - Leipzig - Zürich line, Prague - Linz - Zürich line, Prague - Humenné line and others. RegioJet provides them on various trains on the Prague - Košice line.

==== France ====
Another of the more substantial examples of current European sleeping-car service is the Train Bleu, an all-sleeping-car train. It leaves Paris from the Gare d'Austerlitz station in mid-evening and arrives in Nice at about 8 in the morning, providing both first-class rooms and couchette accommodation. The train's principal popularity is with older travelers; it has not won the same degree of popularity with younger travelers. Recently, the upper-class coaches (wagons lits) have been sold to foreign railroad companies, so that only couchette cars (1st and 2nd class) and seating coaches remain. The Train Bleu is part of the French night service network called Intercités de Nuit.

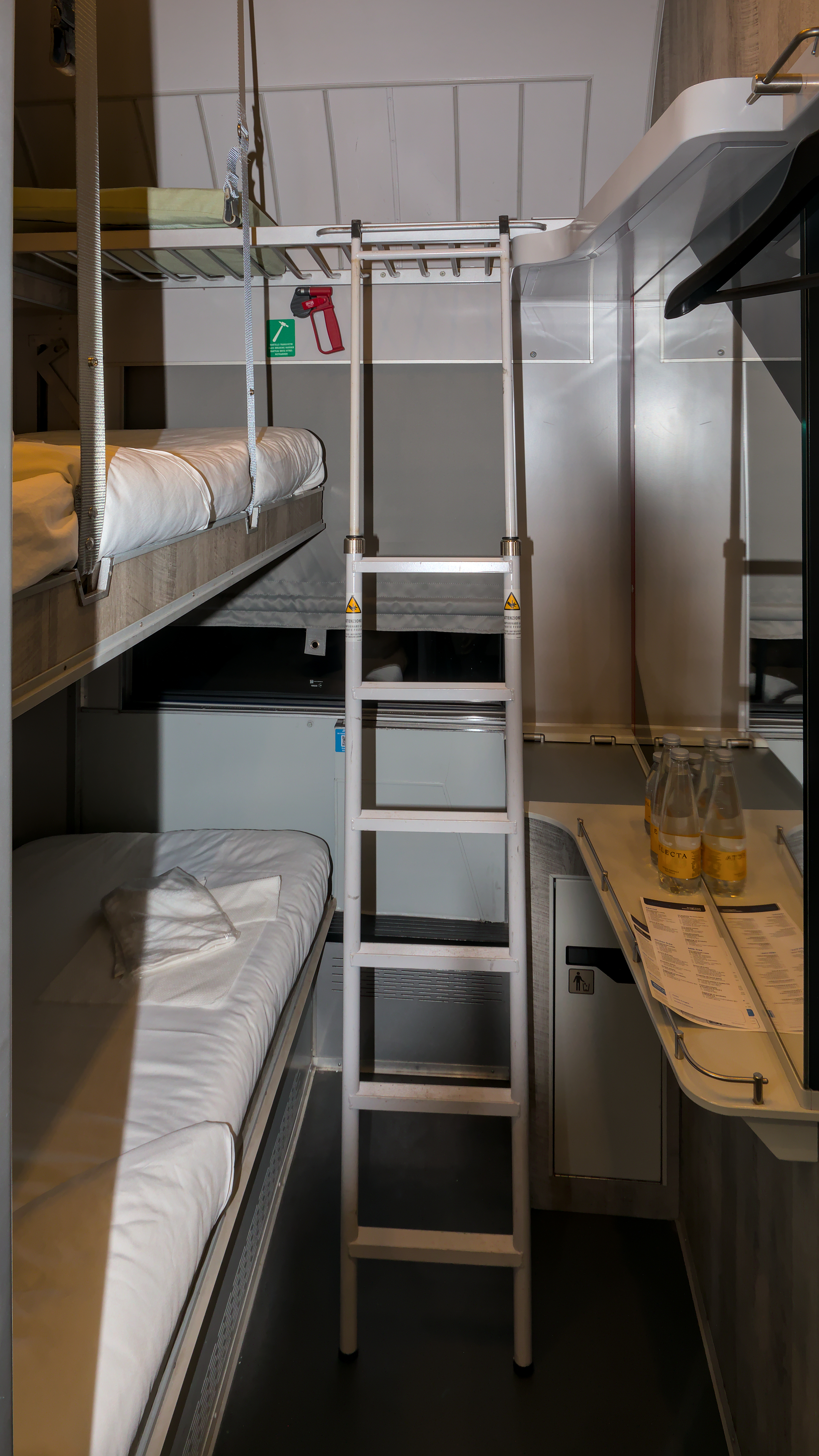
Interior of a two-berth cabin in an Italian sleeping car

==== Italy ====
In Italy, Ferrovie dello Stato operates an extensive network of trains with sleeping cars, especially between the main cities in Northern Italy and the South, including Sicily using train ferry.

==== Poland ====
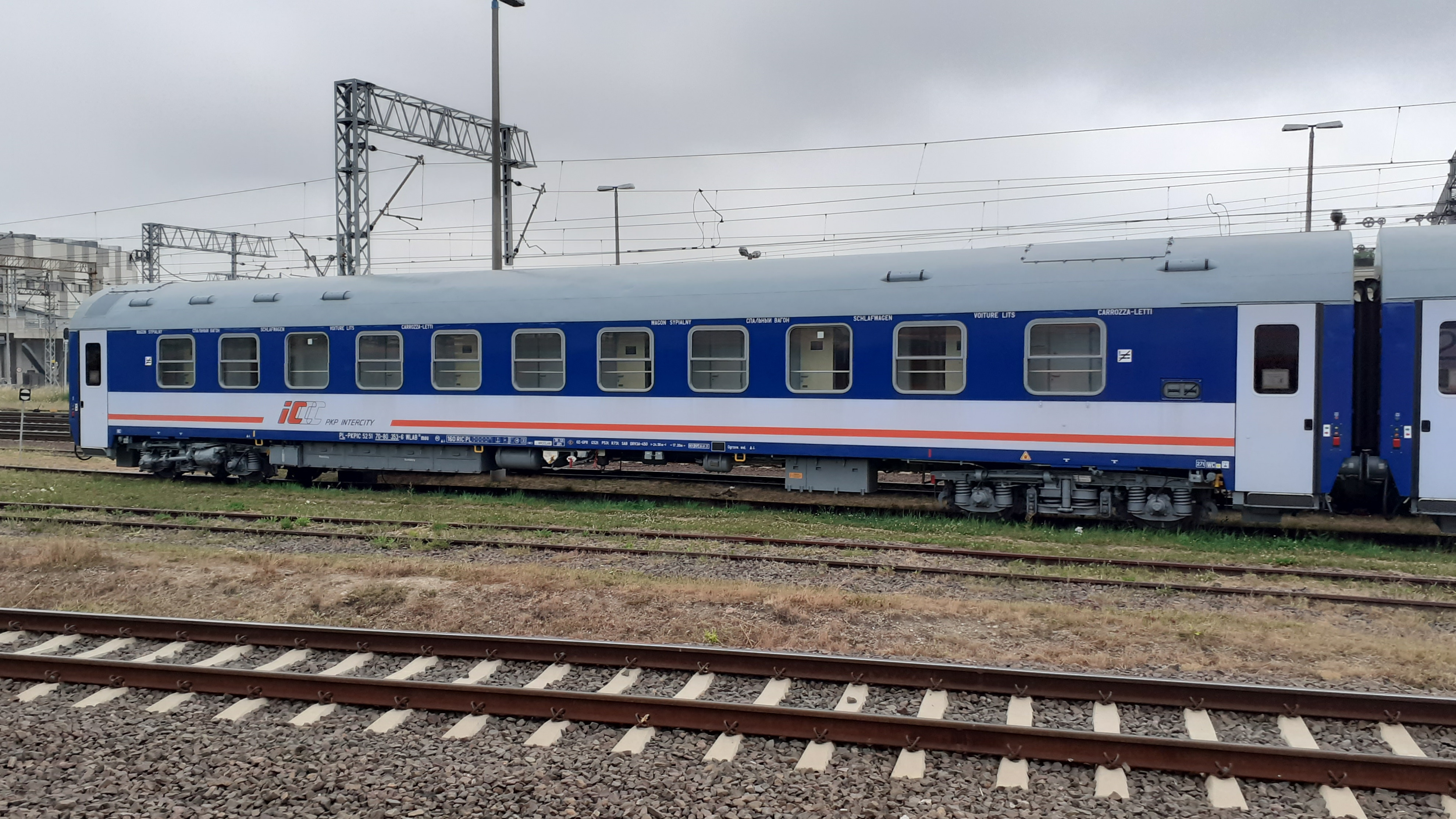
PKP Intercity sleeper car

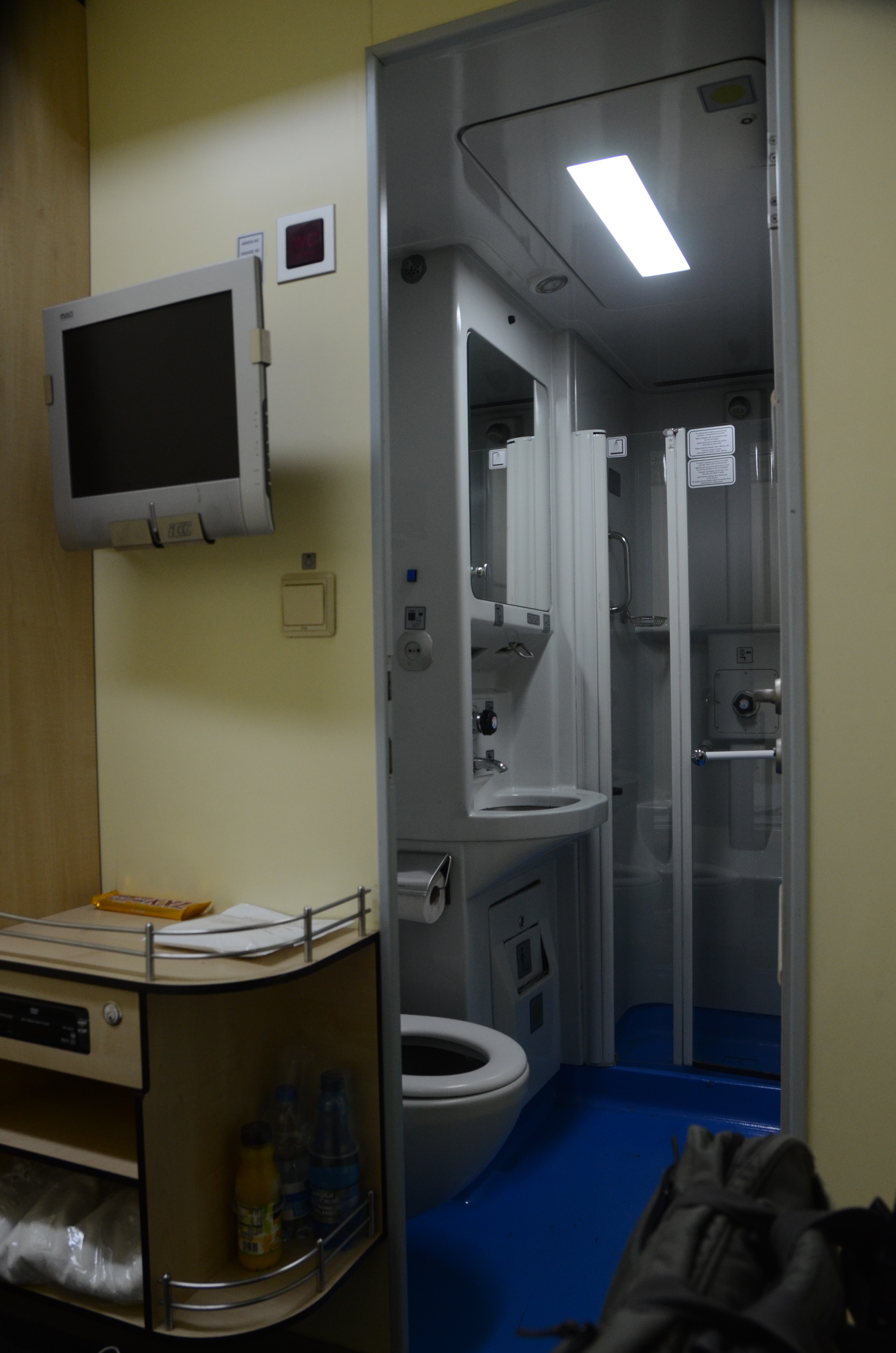
Interior of a sleeper compartment with a private bathroom on a PKP IC train

Sleeping trains in Poland are run by PKP Intercity. Sleeper cars are used on long-distance domestic trains such as the Przemyślanin as well as international trains. Polish night trains also contain standard first and second class seated cars as well as couchette cars. The sleeper cars offer various types of accommodations, including 4-bed, 3-bed, 2-bed and single accommodations, as well as a deluxe option with a private bathroom and shower.

==== Romania ====
Night train numbers have been reduced significantly, as the quality of the rail infrastructure is declining and repairs are insufficient, which leads to longer ride times between cities. A journey from Gara de Nord station in Bucharest to Arad (599 km) usually lasts 11 hours and 20 minutes when there are no delays. Most night trains in Romania cross the country, covering distances of 400 to 750 km, usually to end at certain international destinations or in large cities at opposite ends of the country. The overwhelming majority of night trains with sleeping coaches are owned and operated by CFR Călători (Romanian Railways). Recently, private operators such as Astra Trans Carpatic, the newly founded private operator of Astra Vagoane Arad, has started offering sleeping train services, using own-made sleeping cars and Servtrans locomotives.

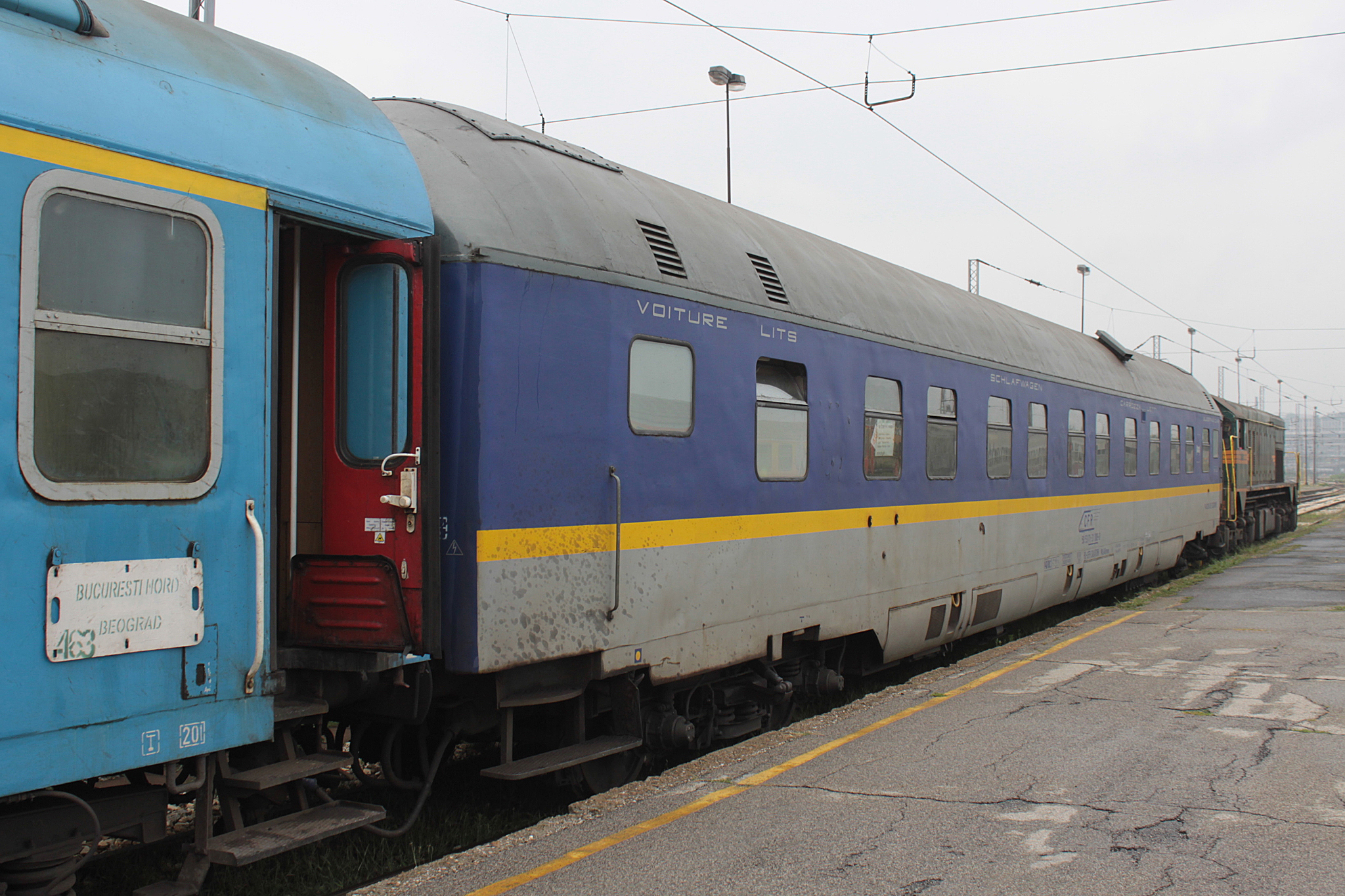
A WLABmee 71-31 car, the standard sleeping car of the CFR, at the defunct Belgrade Main railway station

CFR today prefers operating more couchettes than sleeping cars in its trains, a practice used in Italy and Austria, adopted by the CFR in the early 2010s, thus enabling it to increase the capacity on sleeping trains. The sleeping cars of the CFR in the 1990s consisted of Bautzen and Görlitz-made sleeping cars, standard in the Eastern Bloc. They were replaced by Grivița-made WLABmee 71-70 and Hansa-made WLABmee 71–31, bought second-hand from Deutsche Bahn. The most recent sleeping cars are the WLABmee 70-91 made by Astra Arad, which is the same type used by Astra Rail (although the liveries differ), starting from 2014, 2 of the WLABmee 71-70 cars were refurbished, but no other examples have received the same treatment. Other examples that have been withdrawn since were second-hand examples of the TEN MU and T2S types.

==== Spain and Portugal ====
In Spain, Trenhotel was a long-distance, overnight train service which used Talgo tilting trains technology and sleeping cars developed by the Spanish rail network operator Renfe. It was operated by Renfe and CP where it operated International Sud-Express and Lusitanea services between Spain and Portugal, and by its subsidiary Elipsos (a joint venture between Renfe and French SNCF with a 50% share each) when operating in France, Switzerland and Italy.

Trenhotel services were discontinued during the COVID-19 pandemic, this was due to some routes being covered by daytime high-speed trains, the age of rolling stock and the diminishing popularity of some of the services. Renfe announced that trains to and from the Spanish region of Galicia would eventually be reintroduced. This marked the end of sleeper trains in Portugal and it left Celta as the last international train service between Portugal and Spain.

The Estrella (Star) was a low-cost night train between Madrid and Barcelona served by berth carriages, with compartments for up to 6 people, though it was discontinued in 2015 because the high-speed rail line between the two cities and the more modern Trenhotel services made it redundant.

==== Turkey ====
While most of Turkey's overnight trains operate within Anatolia, in Asia, TCDD Taşımacılık operates one train from Istanbul to Sofia and Bucharest. The train runs through Turkey as a single train and later splits in Bulgaria. Formerly, overnight trains departed Istanbul to several European destinations such as Thessaloniki, Belgrade, Budapest, Warsaw and Kyiv but were all discontinued in the 1990s and 2000s.

A privately operated overnight train, the Optima Express, runs between Edirne and Villach in Austria with an average trip time of 35 hours.

==== United Kingdom ====
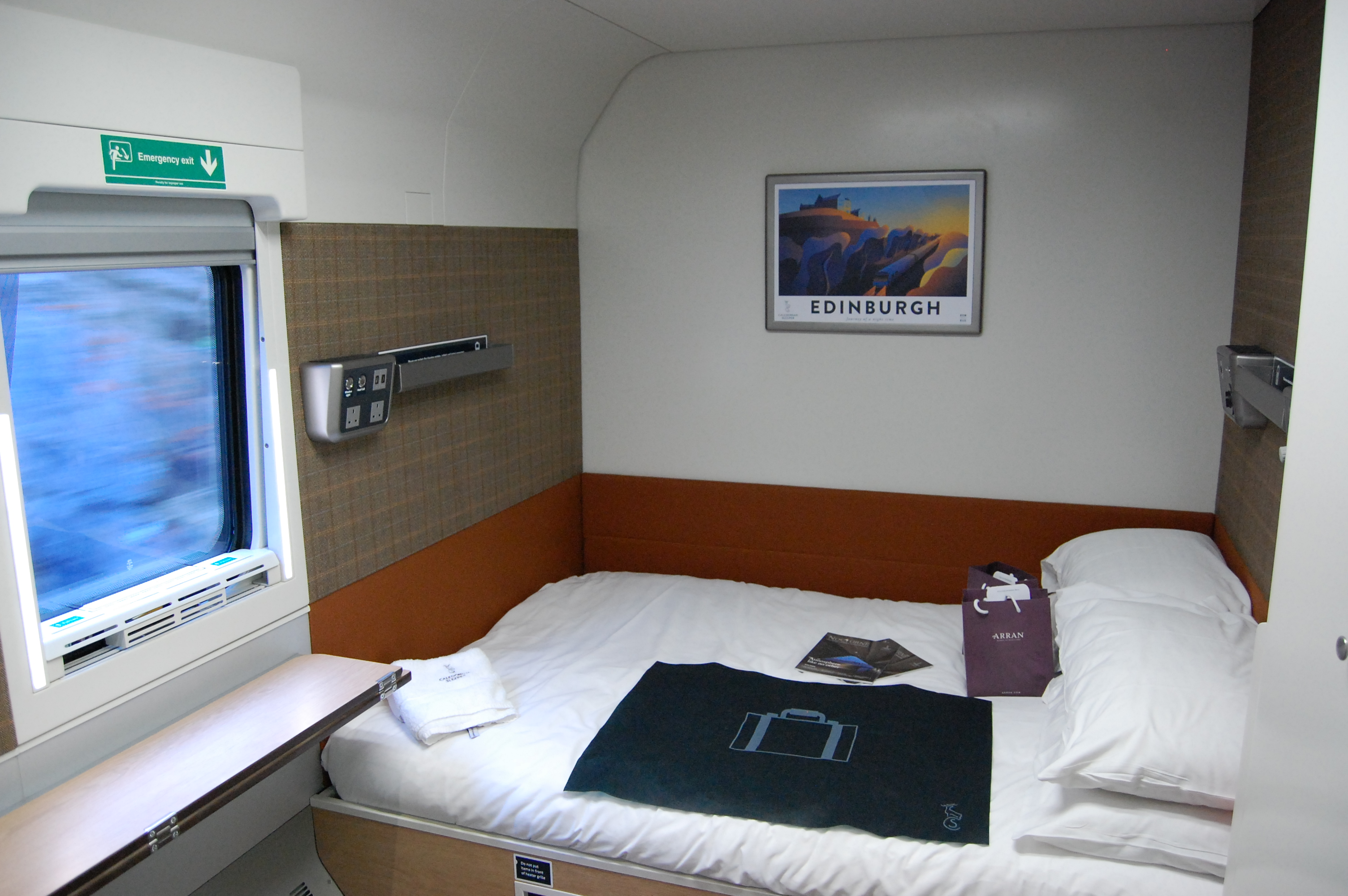
A Caledonian Sleeper double berth in the UK.

In the United Kingdom, a network of trains with sleeping cars operates daily between London and Scotland (Caledonian Sleeper), and between London and the West Country as far as Cornwall (Night Riviera). These services offer a choice of single- or double-occupancy bedrooms. These services operate all week, except Saturdays and usually depart London from Euston and Paddington stations in the evening, arriving at their destinations at approximately 08:00. The Night Riviera service uses British Rail Mark 3s, whereas Caledonian Sleeper uses Mark 5s.

=== North America ===
==== Canada ====
In Canada, all regularly scheduled sleeping car services are operated by Via Rail, using a mixture of relatively new cars and refurbished mid-century ones; the latter cars include both private rooms and "open section" accommodations.

==== United States ====
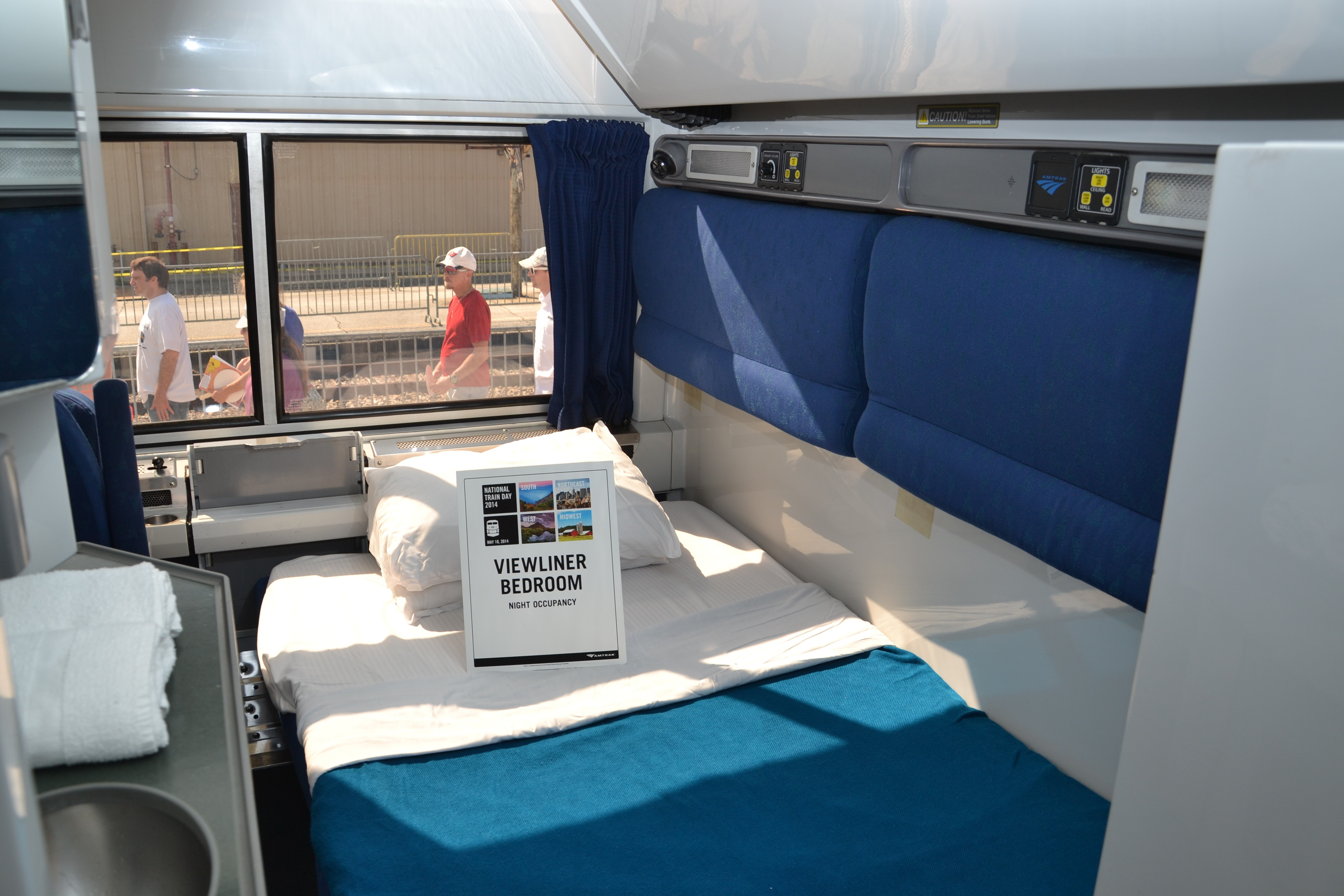
Bedroom of Amtrak Viewliner sleeping car in 2014

In the United States, all regularly scheduled sleeping car services are operated by Amtrak. Amtrak offers sleeping cars on most of its overnight trains, using modern cars of the private-room type exclusively.

Today, Amtrak operates two main types of sleeping car: the bi-level Superliner sleeping cars, built from the late 1970s to the mid-1990s, and the single-level Viewliner sleeping cars, built in the mid-1990s. Superliners are used on most long-distance routes from Chicago westward, while Viewliners are used on most routes east of Chicago due to tunnel clearance issues in and around New York City and Baltimore.

In the most common Superliner sleeping car configuration, the upper level is divided into two halves, one half containing "Bedrooms" (formerly "Deluxe Bedrooms") for one, two, or three travelers, each Bedroom containing an enclosed toilet-and-shower facility; and the other half containing "Roomettes" (formerly "Economy Bedrooms" or "Standard Bedrooms") for one or two travelers; plus a beverage area and a toilet. The lower level contains more Roomettes; a Family Bedroom for as many as two adults and two children; and an "Accessible Bedroom" (formerly "Special Bedroom") for a wheelchair-using traveler and a companion; plus toilets and a shower.

The Viewliner cars contain an Accessible Bedroom (formerly "Special Bedroom") for a wheelchair-using traveler and a companion, with an enclosed toilet-and-shower facility; two Bedrooms (formerly "Deluxe Bedrooms") for one, two, or three travelers, each Bedroom containing an enclosed toilet-and-shower facility; "Roomettes" (formerly "Economy Bedrooms", "Standard Bedrooms", or "Compartments") for one or two travelers, each Roomette containing its own unenclosed toilet and washing facilities; and a shower room at the end of the car.

=== Asia ===
==== China ====
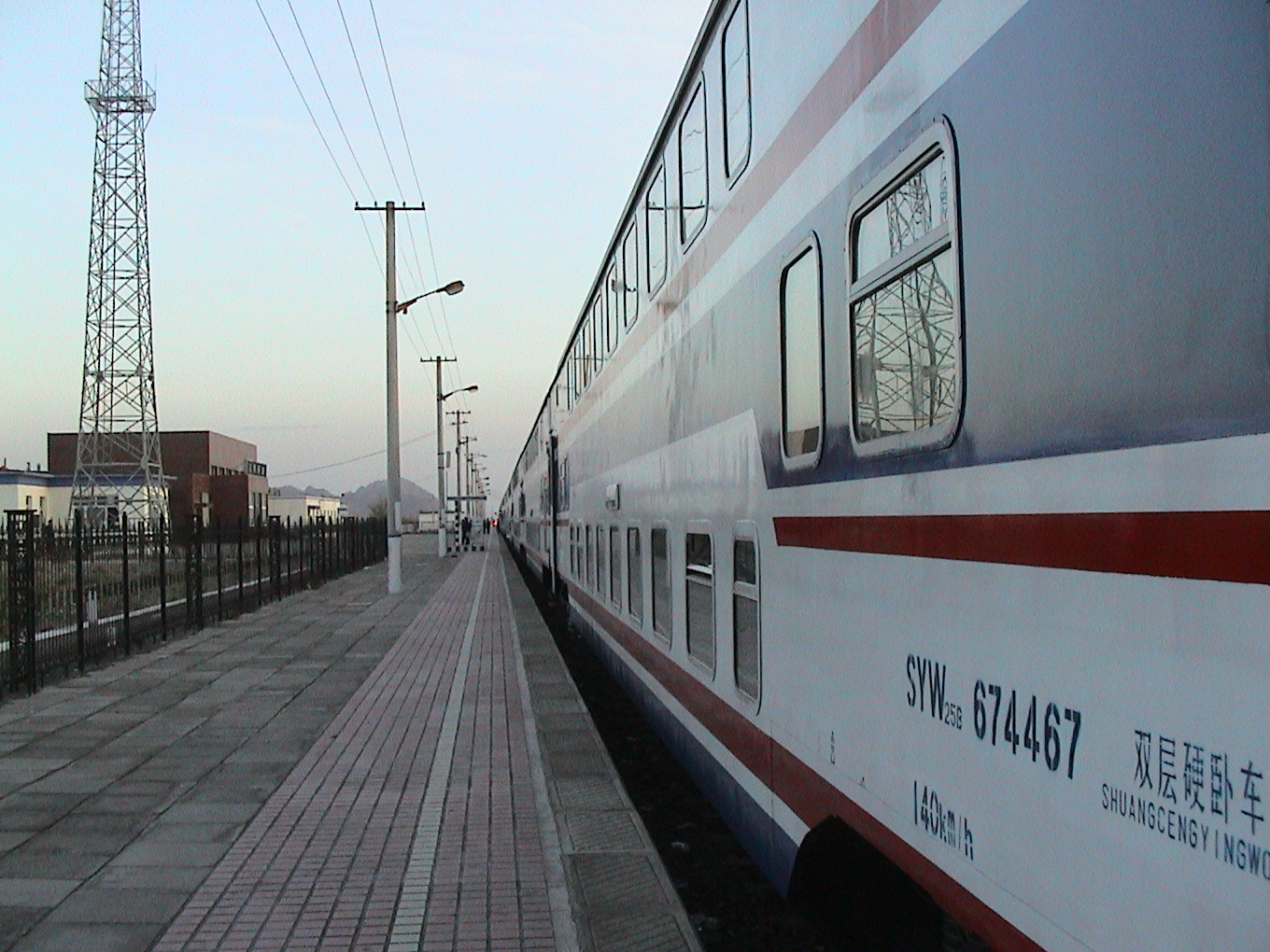
A double-deck conventional passenger sleeping car of China in April 2006

China Railway operates an extensive network of conventional sleeper trains throughout the country, covering all provincial capitals and many major cities. The Chinese "hard" sleeping car in use today is very basic, consisting of 6 fixed bunk beds per compartment, which can be converted into seats in peak season. The middle level bunk bed will be folded and top level bunk bed will still be sold as sleeper, while the lower bed will be occupied by three passengers. Chinese trains also offer "soft" or deluxe sleeping cars with four or two beds per room.

China is the only country to operate high-speed sleeper trains. Sleeper services are operated using high-speed CRH1E, CRH2E, CRH5E and CR400AF-AE trains outfitted with sleeping berths. Services from Beijing and Shanghai to Hong Kong are the fastest sleeper trains in the world, running at speeds of up to 350 km/h (220 mph). The newest trains have open-section sleepers in "hard sleeper" class instead of the six-berth doorless couchette compartments found on conventional sleeper trains and the first high-speed units.

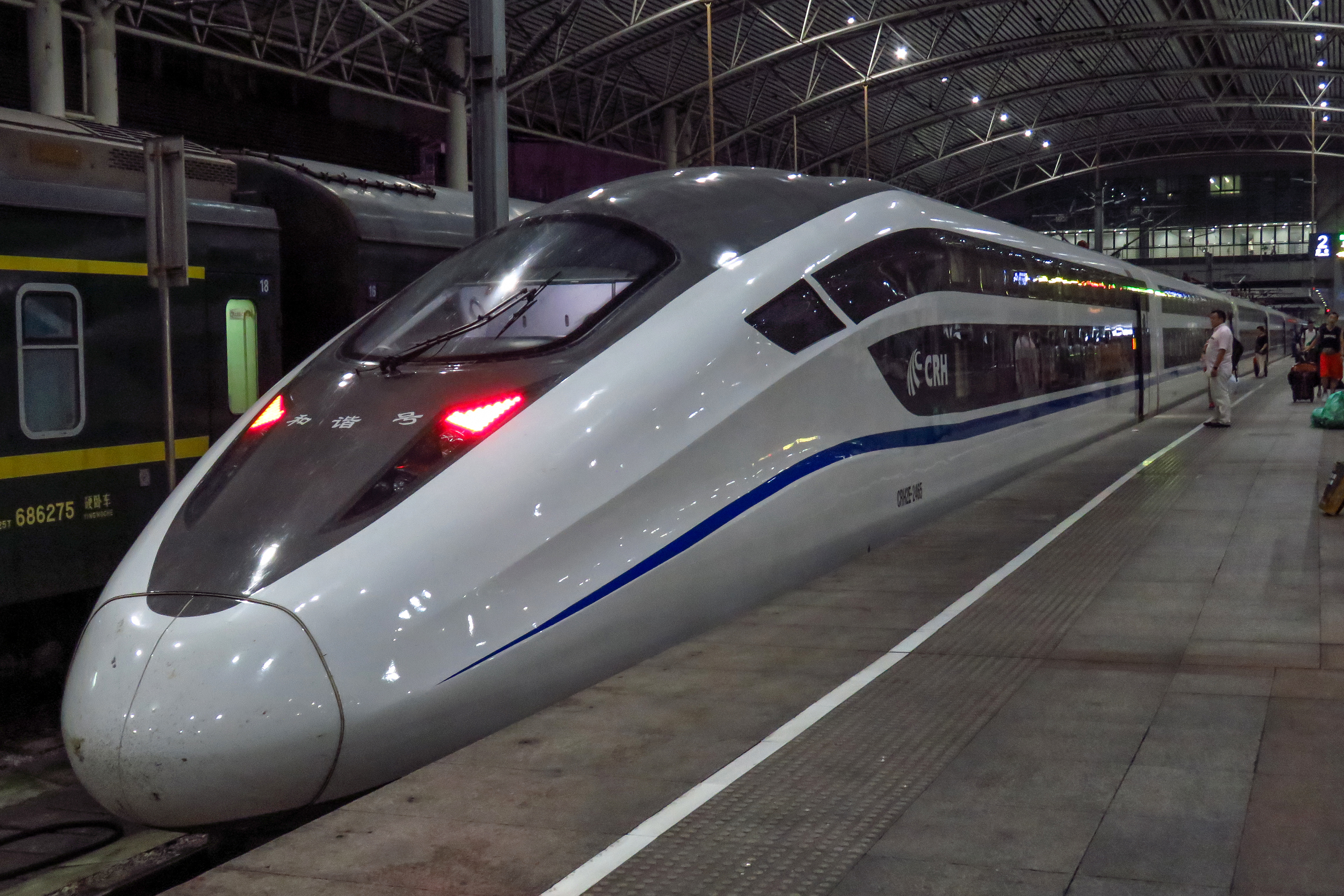
Exterior of the CRH2E sleeper high speed train

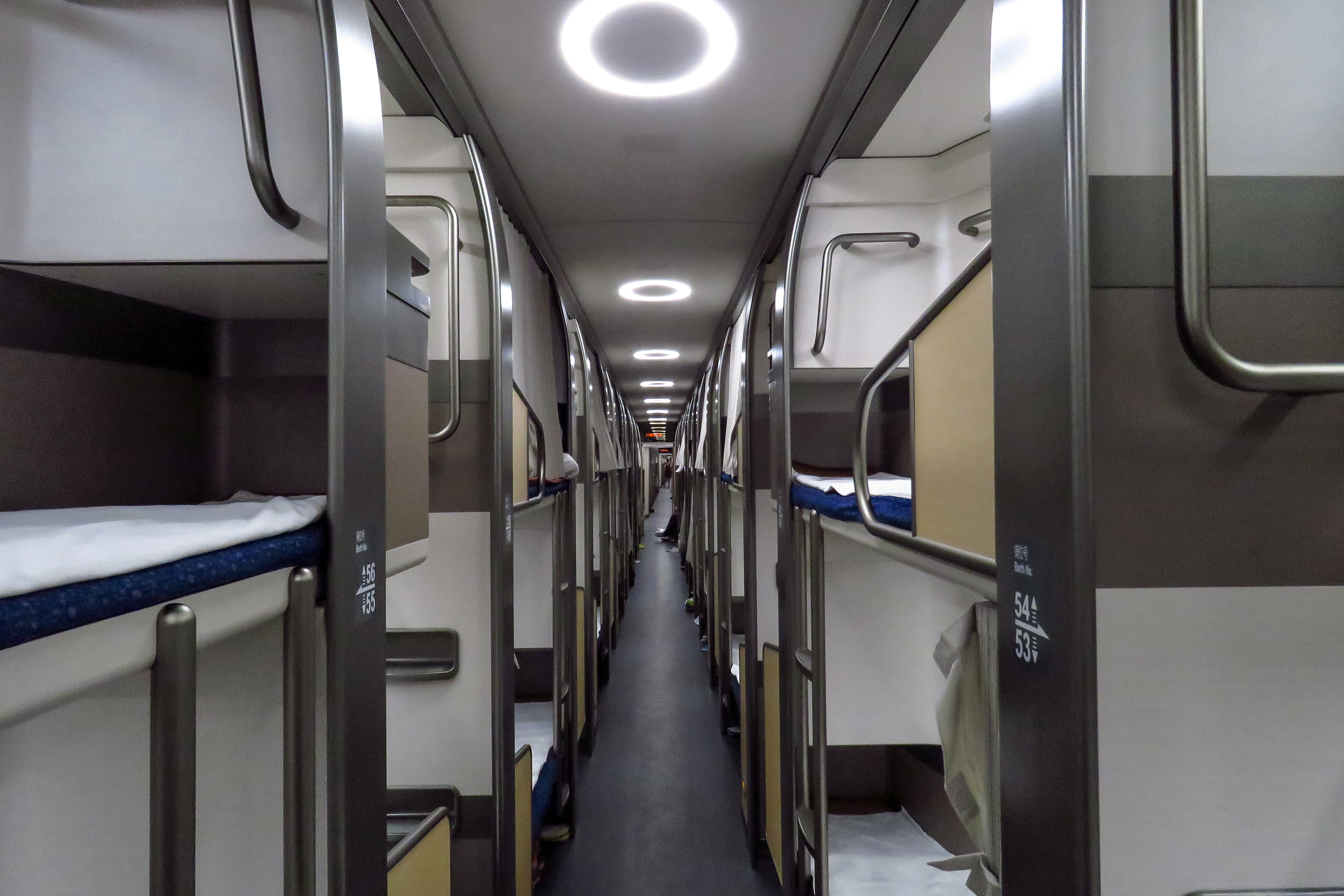
Interior of the CRH2E sleeper high speed train

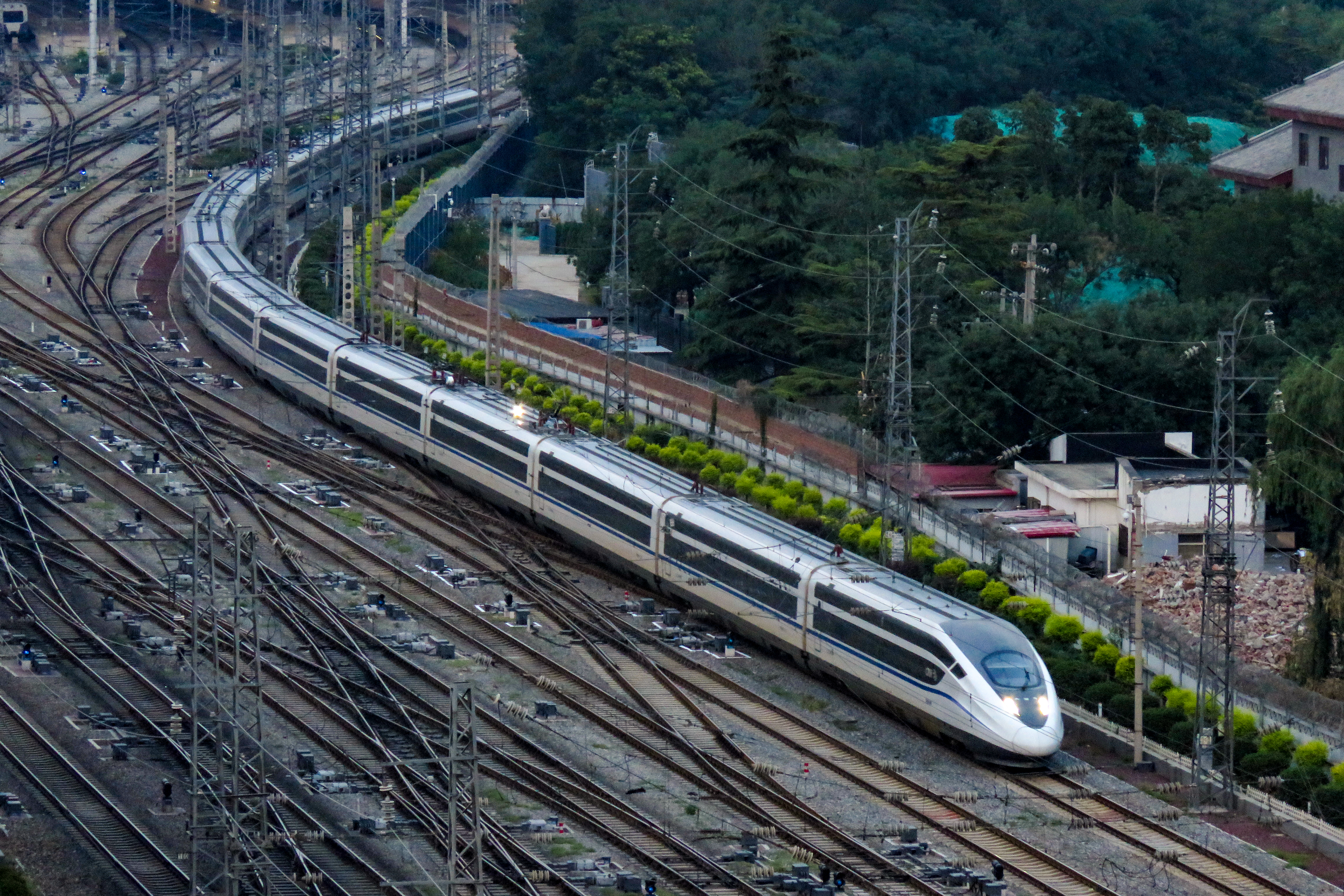
A 16 car CRH2E sleeper high speed train leaving Beijing West railway station

==== India ====
A major portion of passenger cars in India are sleeper/couchette cars. With railways as one of the primary mode of passenger transport, sleeper cars vary from economical to First Class AC (air conditioned). Most Indian trains come in combinations of first class A/C and non-A/C private sleeper cars with doors, and A/C 3-tier or 2-tier couchette arrangements.

==== Japan ====
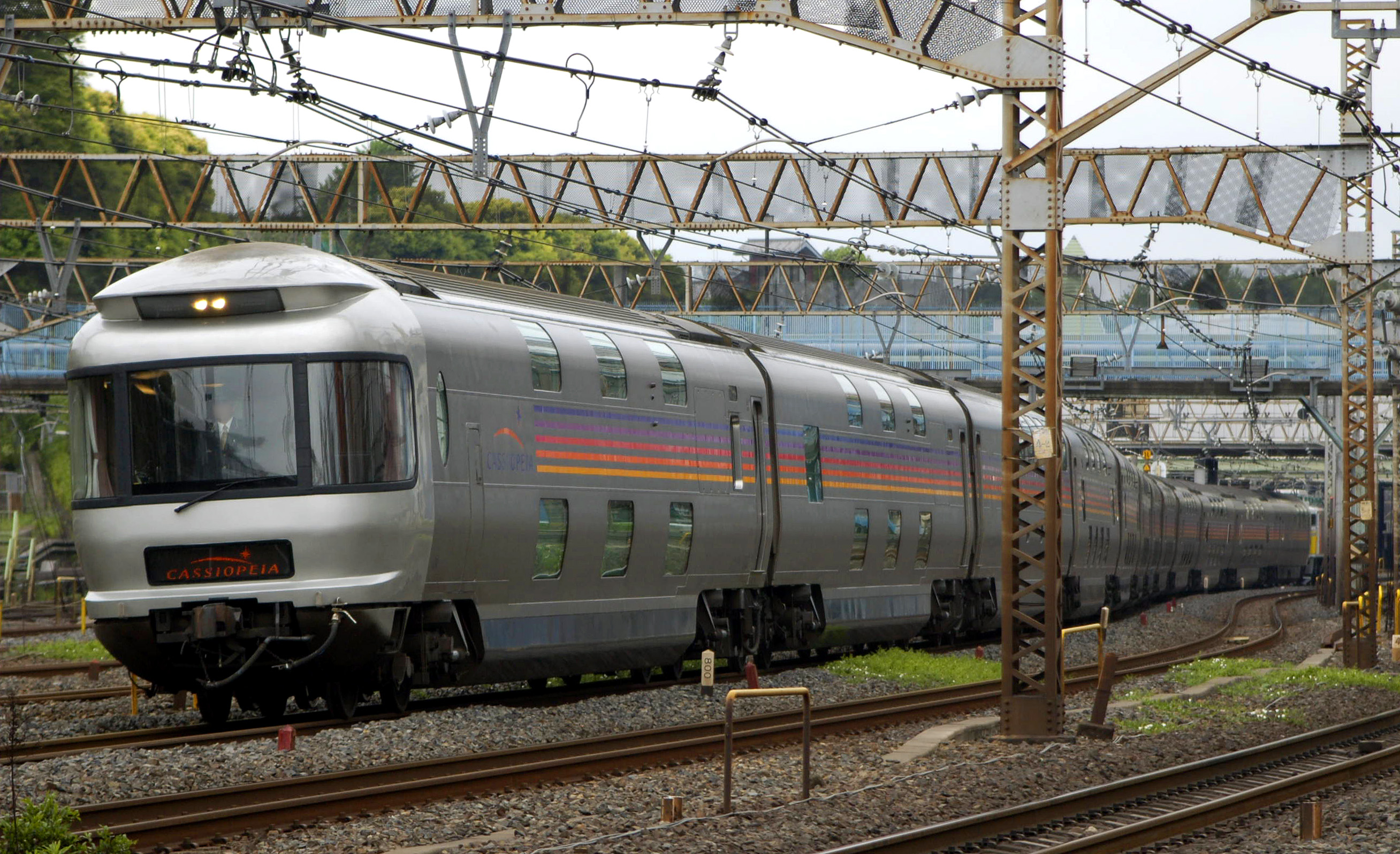
JR East Cassiopeia sleeper car service from Tokyo to Sapporo with 180 degree views. It ceased regular service in March 2016.

Japan used to have many sleeper trains, but most of these routes have been removed because of the development of air travel, overnight bus services and high-speed rail. As of May 2016, sleeper car trains of regular service in Japan are as follows:

- Sunrise Izumo: Tokyo – Izumoshi
- Sunrise Seto: Tokyo – Takamatsu

==== Indonesia ====
The Indonesian State Railways once operated sleeper cars on the Bima between its launch in 1967 and 1995, when the last berth ("couchette") cars were decommissioned.

The successor to the Indonesian State Railways, PT Kereta Api Indonesia, relaunched the Sleeper Train service on 11 June 2018. The first route for sleeper train is from Gambir, Jakarta to Surabaya. The Luxury Sleeper Train is managed by another KAI subsidiary, KAI Wisata.

==== Philippines ====
The Philippine National Railways (PNR) operated a number of 7A-2000 and 14 class sleeper cars between 1999 and 2013. These units were first built for the Japanese National Railways (JNR) in 1974 as 14 series passenger cars (ja), and were donated to the Philippines in 1999. They were meant to serve the Bicol Express in the South Main Line. The 7A-2000 class were a group of 5 single-level cars that were decommissioned after being involved in the fatal 2004 Padre Burgos derailment. On the other hand, the 14 class were a group of bilevel-style couchette cars. After all services to the Bicol Region were halted in 2013, the 14-class couchettes were stored in the Tutuban Yard in Manila.

==== Thailand ====
The State Railway of Thailand operates sleeper cars, both as special express sleeper-only trains on new rolling stock, or mixed with seating cars on slower trains. Trains operate to and from Bangkok Krung Thep Aphiwat Terminal on three of the main lines, the Southern line (to Hat Yai, Sungai Kolok, and Padang Besar on the Malaysian Border), the Northern line (to Chiang Mai), and the Northeastern line (to Ubon Ratchathani, Nong Khai, and Vientiane in Laos).

==== Vietnam ====
The Vietnam Railways provides sleeper cars on North-South Railway between Hanoi and Ho Chi Minh City, and Hanoi–Lào Cai railway between Hanoi and Lào Cai; the latter has much better sleeper cars.

=== Oceania ===
==== Australia ====
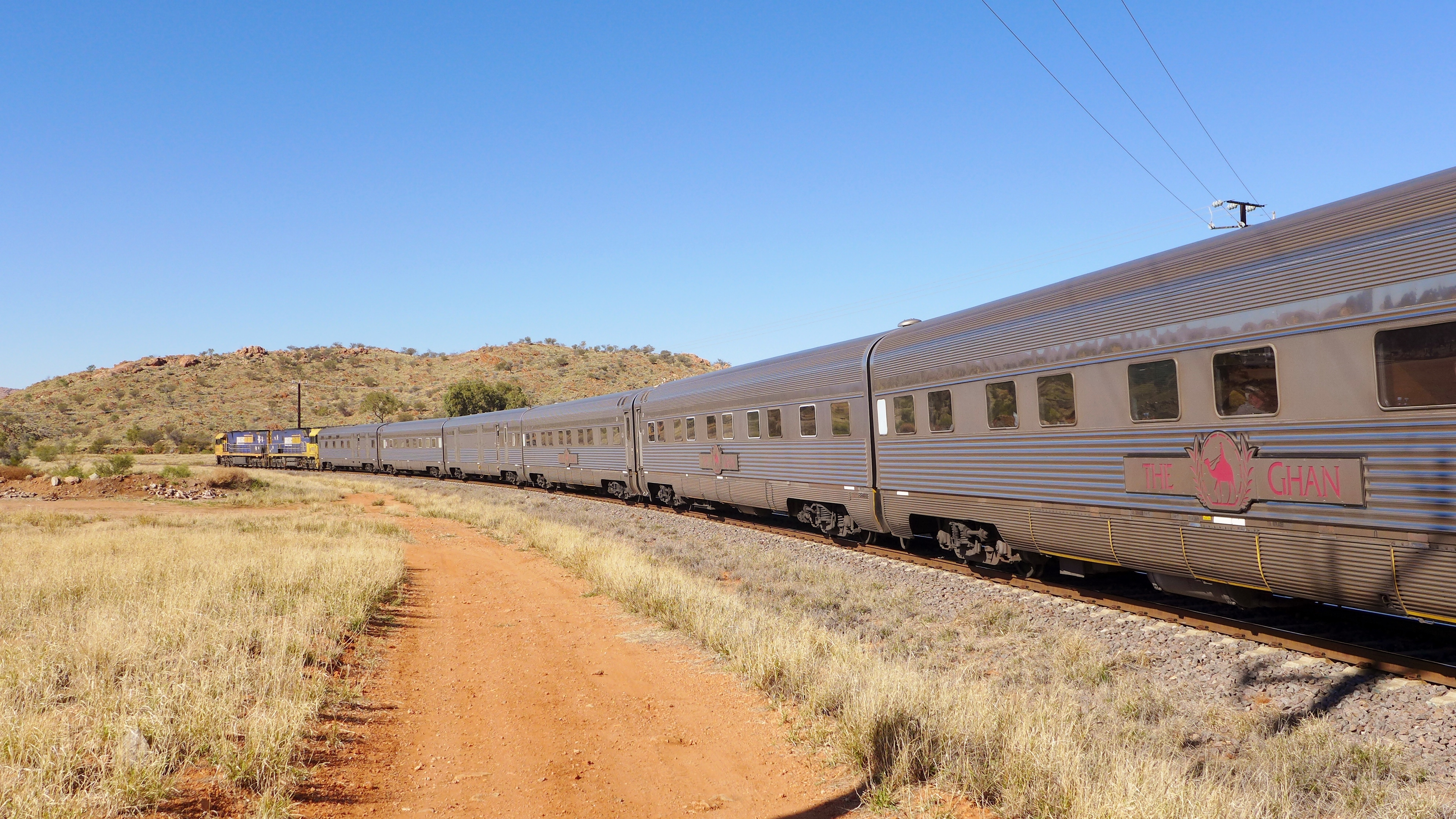
Sleeping cars on The Ghan near Alice Springs in 2015.

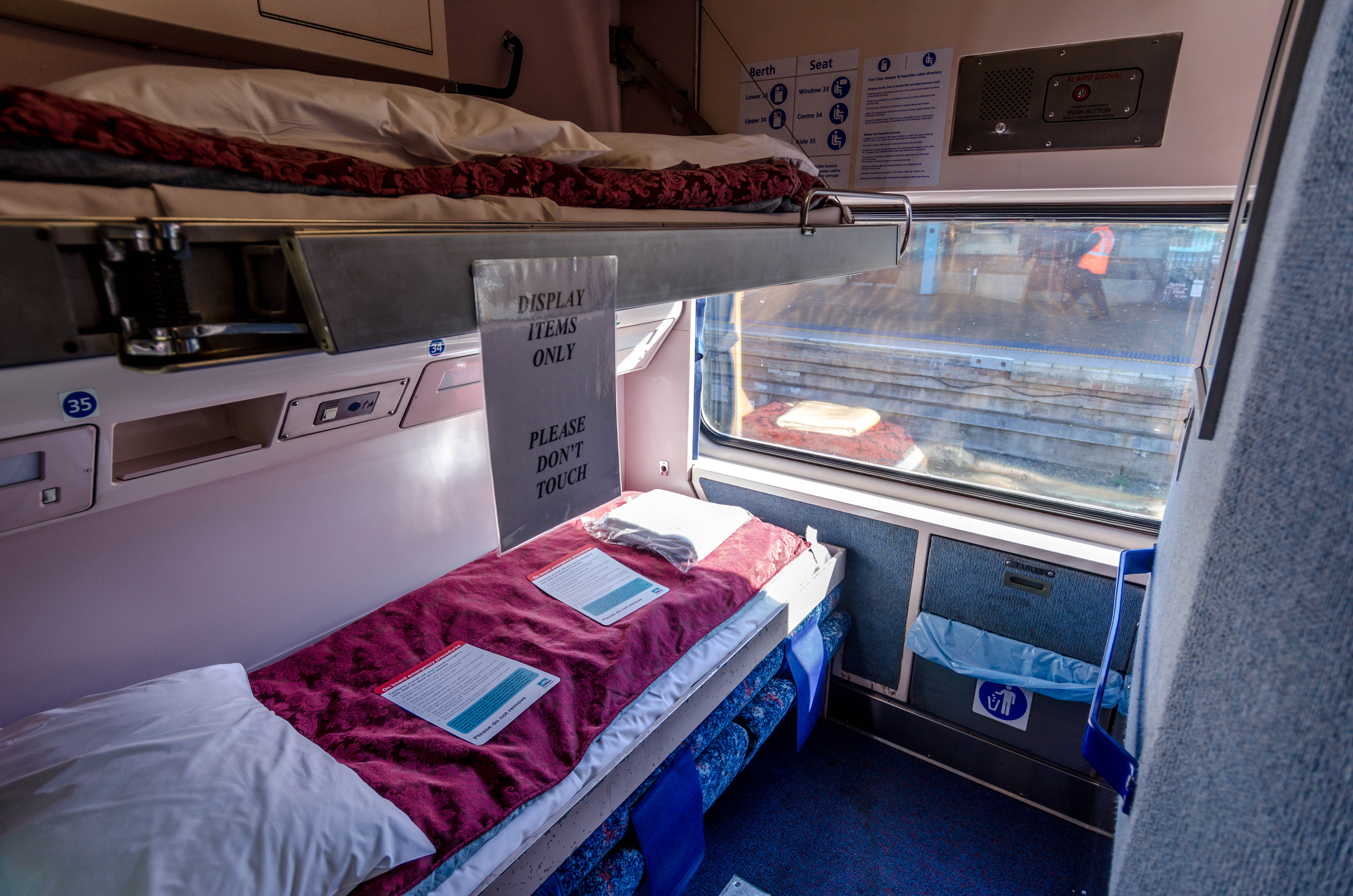
Sleeping cabin of a NSW TrainLink XPT in 2013.

Sleeping cars are used on:

- Journey Beyond's east–west transcontinental train the Indian Pacific between Sydney and Perth, and the north–south transcontinental train The Ghan between Adelaide and Darwin.
- NSW TrainLink's overnight XPT services from Sydney to Melbourne, Casino and Brisbane.
- Queensland Rail's long-distance trains the Spirit of Queensland and Spirit of the Outback.

== Recent developments of new night train interior concepts ==
Since the introduction of the ÖBB Nightjet (Siemens Viaggio Next Level) with its Mini-Cabins, there are for the first time very small compartments, offering the privacy of travelling without strangers in the compartment while facilitating the berth density and the price level of a couchette car.

Further options of minimum-size compartments for passengers travelling alone or in pairs are currently under development or had been published as concepts.

- In 2022 the design and engineering faculties of three European universities – Aalto, KTH and TalTech – discussed plans to reshape sleeping cars for flow production. The ADLNE project aims to create the railcar from modules that are themselves composed of interchangeable segments, compartments and fittings, allowing bespoke designs at low cost.
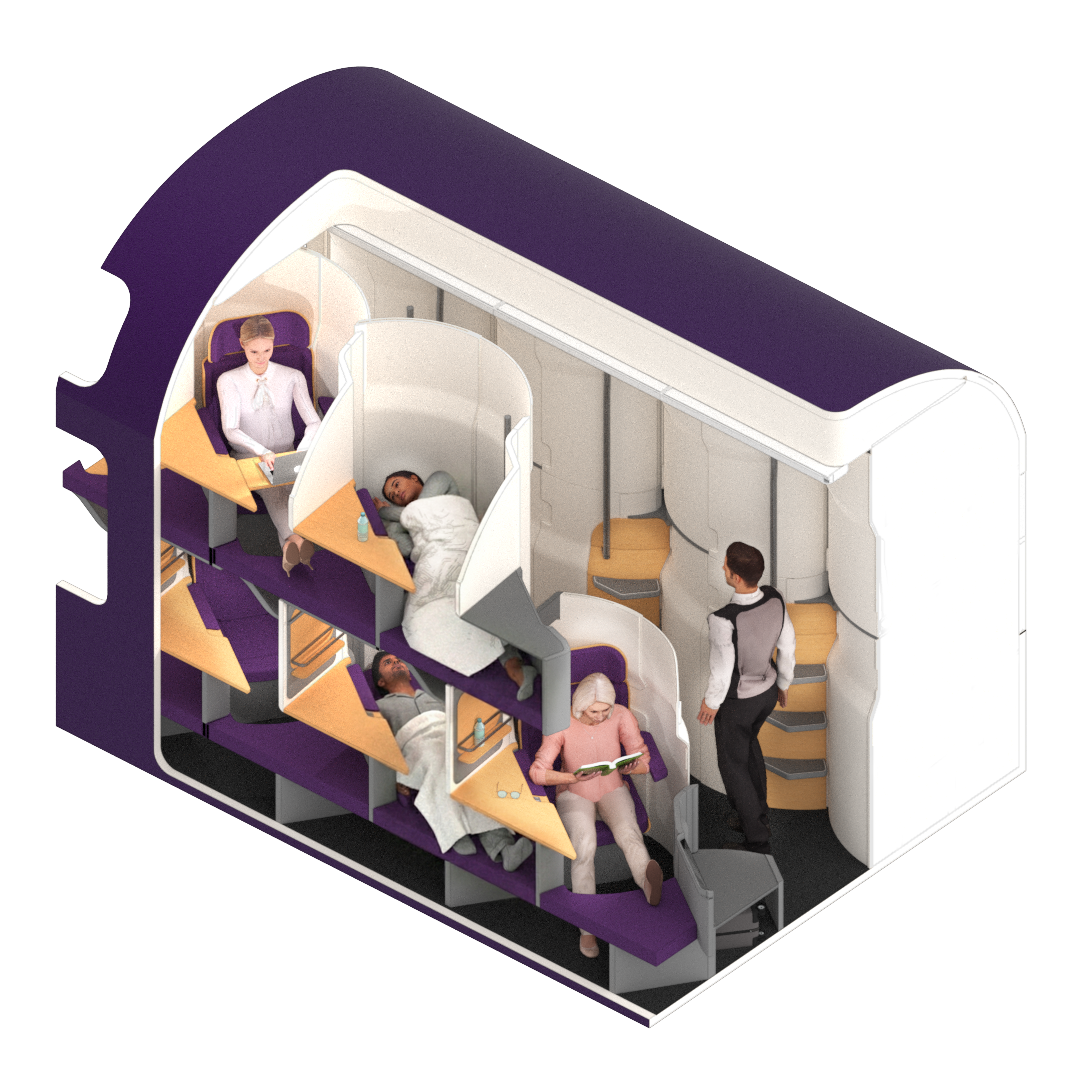
- Seat-Pod compartments by Luna Rail
  The "seat-pod" solution by Luna Rail is based on a diagonal arrangement of very small compartments on both sides of a central aisle. First implementation is planned on the basis of existing single-deck passenger carriages.
- The concept of Nox Mobility is a mix of larger and smaller compartments with some of the berths arranged parallelly and the rest arranged transversely to the direction of travel. The concept of Nox also fits to existing, single-deck passenger carriages.
- The "Sleep in Motion" Concept by Škoda Group consists out of diagonally arranged single-berth compartments in a double-deck trainset. In the lower deck, two rows of compartments are stacked each over another.
- Within the project "TANA", financed by the Austrian Ministry of Transport, a day-and-night railcar interior concept was developed, comprising amongst others single-berth compartments in longitudinal arrangement with tapered foot ends.

Passenger density of different rolling stock solutions

Some of the solutions with very small compartments aim not only at maximum passenger density, but also at universal usability for travelling during the night and during the day (including long night train routes with passengers spending a significant part of the travel time during the day). Other concepts rather sacrifice seating comfort for the sake of more privacy at high berth density. Combined day-and-night operation offers the opportunity of better utilisation of rolling stock, but specific operational concepts are required in order to achieve good average occupancy and competitive travel times while avoiding problems arising from the transitioning between night and day train operation.

== See also ==
- Auto Train – Amtrak railway service
- Jovita (railcar) – Preserved Pullman sleeping car
- Lists of named passenger trains
- Pullman (car or coach) – Passenger car built or operated by the Pullman Company
- Red-eye flight – Flight scheduled to depart at night and arrive the next morning
- Sleeper bus – Long-distance coach with passenger beds
- Troop sleeper – Type of military railroad passenger car
- Twinette – Oceanian term for type of sleeping car
- Waltersburg – Preserved Pullman sleeping car
- Couchette car – Railway carriage with sleeping compartments

== Sources ==
- White, John H. (1985) [1978]. The American Railroad Passenger Car. Baltimore, Maryland: Johns Hopkins University Press. ISBN 978-0-8018-2743-3.
- Martin, Andrew (2017). Night Trains: The Rise and Fall of the Sleeper. London: Profile Books. ISBN 9781781255605.
