= Bon Jovi (disambiguation) =

Bon Jovi is an American rock band.

Bon Jovi may also refer to:

- Bon Jovi (album), 1984 debut album released by the eponymous band Bon Jovi
- Jon Bon Jovi (born 1962), American musician and lead singer of the band Bon Jovi
- Valentino Bon Jovi Bong (born 1989), Malaysian squash player

== See also ==
- Bongiovi (surname), also spelled as "Bon Jovi"
- Bon (disambiguation)
- Jovi (disambiguation)
