= Jovita Laurušaitė =

Lithuanian painter and ceramist

Jovita Laurušaitė (born December 12, 1956, in Vilnius) is a Lithuanian painter and ceramist. A graduate from the Vilnius Academy of Art, she has participated in exhibitions in Lithuania and abroad (Estonia, Latvia, Finland, United Kingdom, United States, Australia) since 1980.

== Works ==
Laurušaitė creates figurative dishes, mainly bowls and pots in the shape of a woman. The early works from simple clay and chamotte are characterized by distinctive interpretation of ancient cultures, art and architecture of exotic lands. Other characteristics include subdued dark colors, figurative and ornamental decor, highlighted details (for example, very careful execution of fanciful hairdos). Noted works from this period include Puodas (Pot, 1979), Dvi draugės (Two Friends, 1979), Dubuo su dangčiu (Bowl with Cover, 1980), Besikalbančios (While Talking, 1981), Moterys (Women, 1980–1990).

Later works – vases in shape of a woman – exhibit soft, free, sometimes asymmetric shapes. Details (body parts) are often not well-pronounced, leaving clear traces of molding process. White chamotte and stoneware are primary materials. The surfaces of the dishes are first glazed white and then lavishly decorated in bright colors and relief. Works from this period include Katinėlis ir angelas (Kitty and Angel, 1999), Moteris su ožiais (The Woman with the Goats, 2002), Vakarienės metas (Dinner Time, 2002), Mama su vaiku (Mother with Child, 2003), Su prijuoste (With the Apron, 2004), Su papais (With the Tits, 2005), Su ąsomis (With Jug's Handles, 2006).
