= Jovita (railcar) =

Preserved Pullman sleeping car

The Jovita is a steel heavyweight train sleeping car built by and for the Pullman Company in 1914. It is believed it is one of the oldest heavyweight Pullman cars in its original configuration still in existence. It was built with 12 open Sections and one Drawing Room. The car had twelve open sections with a fold-down upper berth and lower berth made by folding the seats down in each section, and one drawing room - a large enclosed room with three beds and its own toilet and sink. The car was unusual in that it has a removable boards between the sections, when open it gives the car a very open feeling.

The car has been in several movies including Eight Men Out, where baseball commissioner Kenesaw Mountain Landis is seen riding away in the car. It is also seen in the movie Lost in Yonkers, there are some good interior shots of the car,

Pullman's first all-steel car, the Jamestown, was built in 1907. It proved the merits of steel construction, but was overweight. Additional work resulted in a lighter, improved car structure. Production began in January 1910 with a car named Carnegie, and continued, using the same basic design, for the next two decades. This standard car structure also allowed Pullman to standardize various mechanical systems, resulting in improved reliability in addition to the greater strength and safety of the steel cars.

It was used as a tourist sleeper in its later life, then sold to the Circus and later to an "Orange Belt" tourist line.

Today, the Jovita is part of the collection of the Railway Museum of Greater Cincinnati.
