= Rustai-ye Shahid Saidi =

Rustai-ye Shahid Saidi روستاي شهيد سعيدي
- Village
- Location within Iran
- Coordinates: 28°53′48″N 57°53′24″E
- Country: Iran
- Province: Kerman
- County: Jiroft
- Bakhsh: Jebalbarez
- Rural District: Maskun

Population (2006)
  - Total: 287
- Time zone: UTC+3:30 (IRST)
  - Summer (DST): UTC+4:30 (IRDT)

Rustai-ye Shahid Saidi (Persian: روستاي شهيد سعيدي, also Romanized as Rūstāī-ye Shahīd Sa‘īdī; also known as Shahīd Sa‘īdī) is a village in Maskun Rural District, Jebalbarez District, Jiroft County, Kerman Province, Iran. At the 2006 census, its population was 287, in 62 families.
