= Jovi-ye Majid =

Jovi-ye Majid جوي مجيد
- Village
- Location within Iran
- Coordinates: 32°06′58″N 48°14′37″E
- Country: Iran
- Province: Khuzestan
- County: Shush
- Bakhsh: Central
- Rural District: Hoseynabad

Population (2006)
  - Total: 1,284
- Time zone: UTC+3:30 (IRST)
  - Summer (DST): UTC+4:30 (IRDT)

Jovi-ye Majid (Persian: جوي مجيد, also Romanized as Jovī-ye Majīd; also known as Jovī, Jowvī, and Shahīd Sa‘īdī) is a village in Hoseynabad Rural District, in the Central District of Shush County, Khuzestan Province, Iran. At the 2006 census, its population was 1,284, in 163 families.
